= Cornell University pumpkin prank =

1997 prank at Cornell University

Coordinates: 42°26′51″N 76°29′06″W

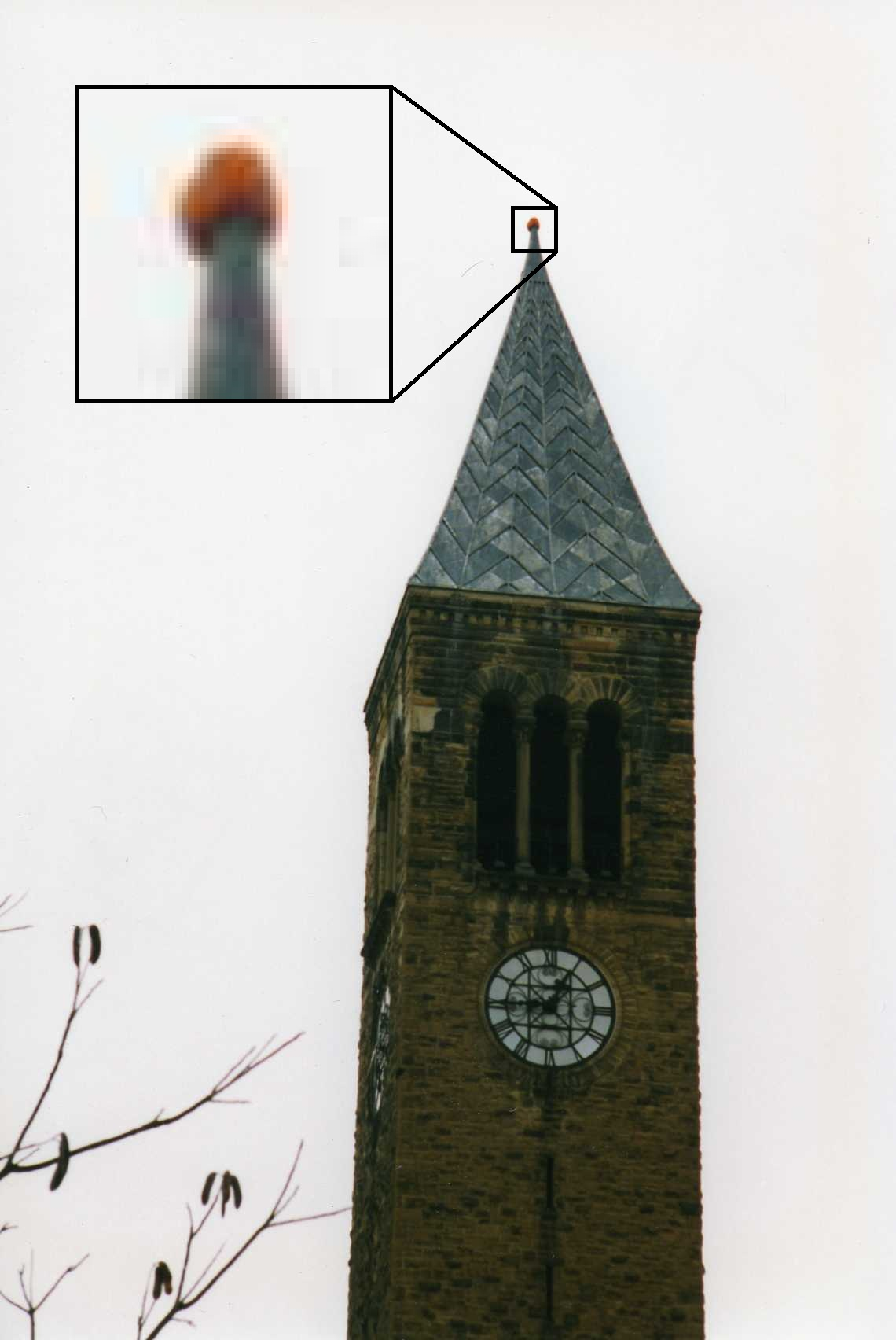
The pumpkin atop McGraw Tower in November 1997

In October 1997, a pumpkin was placed on the lightning rod of McGraw Tower at Cornell University in Ithaca, New York, United States. Due to attempts to identify the object, speculation on how it was placed, and the unknown identity of the culprit, the pumpkin acquired national news coverage as well as a dedicated website with a webcam. It was referred to as the Great Pumpkin Mystery.

The pumpkin stayed on the top of the tower until March 1998, when it was accidentally knocked down by a crane cage during a rehearsal for its removal. After its recovery by the university's provost, it was freeze-dried and held in a glass case in various areas of the university until it decayed fully. The pumpkin continued as a part of university legend, with its anniversary marked in 2007 and 2017 and another pumpkin placed on the tower during renovations in 2023.

== History ==
=== Placement of the pumpkin ===
Prior to October 8, 1997, an unknown individual or group of individuals placed a pumpkin on the lightning rod of McGraw Tower at Cornell University, 173 feet (53 m) in the air. University spokesman David Brand would later state that the pumpkin appeared to have been carved to fit the rod. They likely climbed up the tower's staircase which was open to the public at specified times, moved through the tower's bell cage without tripping the wires that would sound the chimes, cut a lock near the roof, emerged through a small service hatch at the bottom of the roof, and climbed 20 feet (6.1 m) up the steeply pitched steel roof of the tower to do so.

=== Identification, theories, and investigation ===
An unidentified object was reported at the top of the tower on October 8, and it became famous. Gould Colman, who had just retired as the university's archivist, stated that the occurrence was "much better than a prank," and "first-rate stuff, the best that I've seen. What a clever accomplishment to get this pumpkin up there." Students placed a collection of pumpkins at the base of the tower, before the university placed an orange fence around the tower with a sign stating "Beware of Falling Pumpkin". A website for the pumpkin was created which was viewed 700,000 times, and featured a dedicated online webcam feed. A student wrote a pumpkin version of Cornell's alma mater. For three weeks, the pumpkin was the subject of a daily feature in The Cornell Daily Sun called "Pumpkin Watch" on its front page, as well as coverage from Associated Press and MTV.

While it was largely thought to be a pumpkin, some at the university doubted this assessment, with one assistant professor of horticultural sciences stating that it was too hardy to be of biotic origin. In an effort to definitively identify the object, the university sponsored a contest to identify it without leaving the ground. Physics and engineering students used remote-controlled weather balloons, including one with a hypodermic needle to take samples and another with a drill and video cameras, in attempts to identify it. The contest had five entrants, two teams and three individuals. First place was won by a team that built a remote-controlled balloon, which took the group four 15- to 18-hour days to build, and which carried a video camera and drill built to take a sample. It was modeled after technology used in planetary exploration. They received $250 and a lithograph of a drawing of the Great Pumpkin autographed by Charles Schulz.

Multiple theories were proposed as to how the pumpkin was placed on the tower, including by helicopter. The university's president Hunter R. Rawlings III, who was over 6 feet (1.8 m) tall, joked that "it was me," and that he "stood on [his] tippy toes."

Despite this, the university also stated it would consider bringing charges against whoever placed the pumpkin, and campus police investigated the incident. However, some students proposed amnesty for the culprit. One archivist for the university offered to take a sealed envelope containing the name of the person who placed the pumpkin and open it in 5 or 10 years. The pumpkin stayed at the top of the tower until springtime, slowly rotting.

=== Recovery ===
Initially, university officials considered removing the pumpkin due to its potential to fall and cause lethal damage, but later decided to "let the pumpkin ooze down the side of the tower, rather than risk someone's life or go to a great deal of expense just to retrieve a pumpkin".

Plans were made to retrieve the pumpkin on March 13, 1998, the final day before spring break, and 157 days after the pumpkin first appeared. This entailed the university's provost, Don Michael Randel, ascending next to the tower in a crane bucket to retrieve the pumpkin, intended to be viewed by hundreds of spectators as well as news media gathered around the tower. Celebrations would have included the sale of pumpkin ice cream, commemorative T-shirts, and an ambulance which would have transported the pumpkin to a laboratory where a team of horticultural researchers would have analyzed it. A practice run was performed with the crane around 45 minutes prior to when the pumpkin was intended to be removed; at 9:17 am, either a gust of wind or an error from the crane operator caused the crane's empty cage to knock the pumpkin off, and it fell 20 feet (6.1 m) onto a scaffold that had been put up to repair the tower. 200 people had gathered by 10 am; they watched Randel instead use the crane to retrieve the pumpkin from the scaffold and give it to a Cornell scientist. It was found that the shrivelled pumpkin was nearly 2 feet (61 cm) in diameter.

Two weeks later, through analysis of "microscopic slides, videotapes and photographs," a panel of plant biology professors declared the object's validity as a pumpkin. The remains of the pumpkin were then freeze-dried and placed in a glass case to be kept in the visitors' center. It was later moved to a display of brains in the psychology department and then to the office of professor Barbara Finlay before it decayed completely.

=== Legacy and claims of responsibility ===
Multiple claims of responsibility have continued to be put forward years after the recovery of the pumpkin. In 1999, editor-in-chief of the school paper Farhad Manjoo received an anonymous tip which potentially explained how the prank was carried out, involving a climb up the spire of the tower and the use of duct tape. The May 2000 Graduation issue of The Cornell Daily Sun stated that the prank was carried out by one Cornell student ringleader and two other Ithacan accomplices. In the Cornell Chimes Newsletter, it was stated that a student from the University of Montana, "Rob", confessed to former Head Chimesmaster Courtney Kimball that they had placed the pumpkin; Atlas Obscura deemed this inauthentic, though Cornell historian Ryan Earle stated that this was "the best source for how it happened." One rumor also claimed that the prankster's identity was passed down through each university archivist.

In 2017, 20 years following the placement of the first pumpkin atop the tower, Manjoo, then reporter at The New York Times, called the event "the greatest prank in Cornell history" and that there was "no downside" in the pranksters coming forward as "all of that has passed now. Now they're just legends." Evan Fay Earle, the university archivist in 2017, stated that the pumpkin "continue[d] to generate interest at Cornell and [in] the community". The website about the pumpkin was partially brought back online for the anniversary.

== Similar events ==
=== Cornell University ===
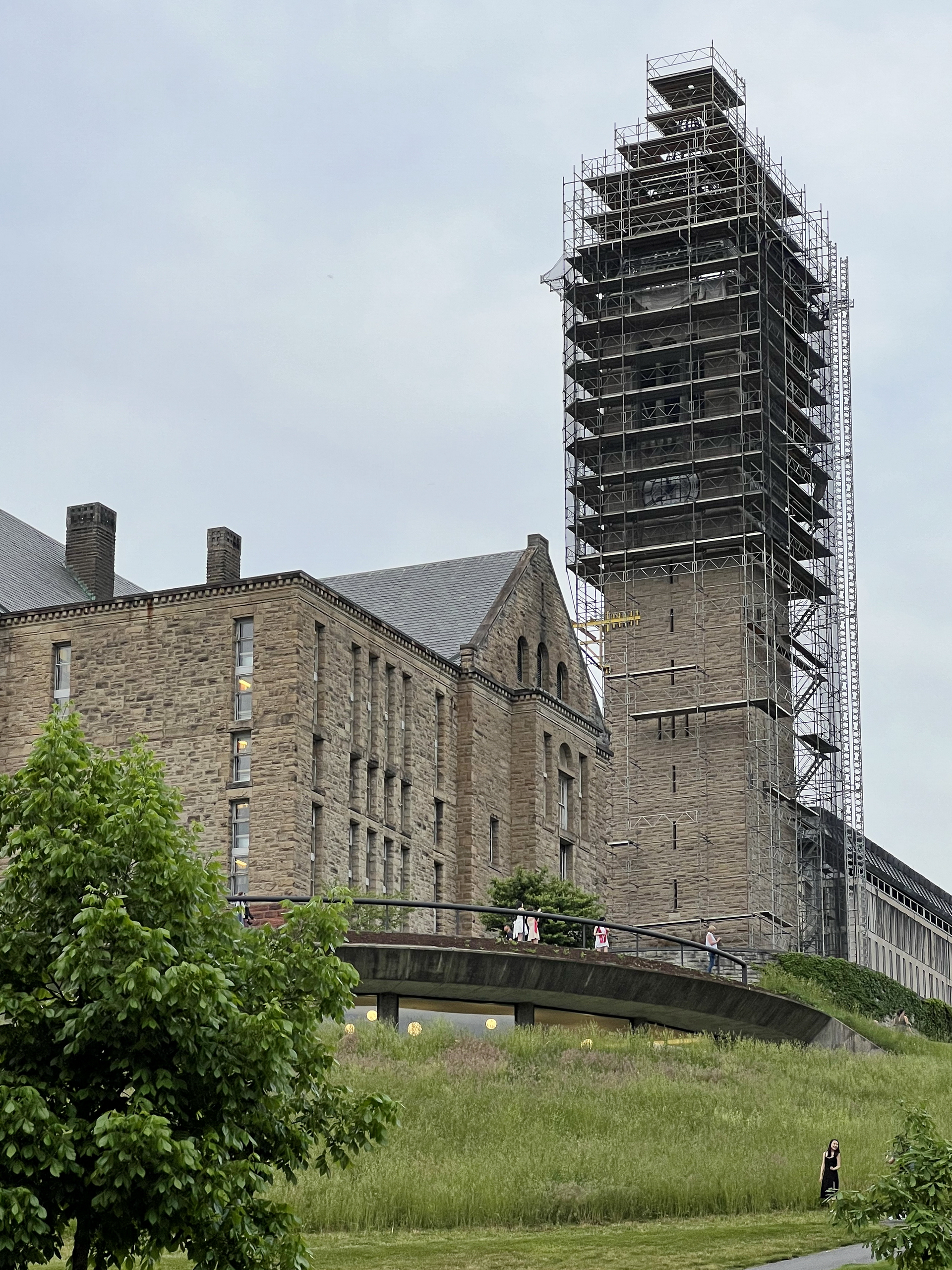
Scaffolding around the tower in 2024

In May 2005, a disco ball was found affixed to the top of McGraw Tower. Due to safety concerns about the glass shattering, the disco ball was removed the next day by crane, costing the university $20,000–25,000.

In December 2019, a Santa hat was placed on the spire. The Cornell Daily Sun speculated the hat was put there by drone, though no one claimed responsibility and this was never proven. On October 20, 2023, 26 years after the first pumpkin, a second pumpkin was noticed on top of the tower. The pumpkin had been placed there during significant renovations which had included the erection of scaffolding. The identity of the person who put it there was verified, though not released, by The Cornell Daily Sun. The prankster came forward after feeling "attacked" by other students falsely claiming responsibility.

=== Other locations ===
Every Halloween since 1969, a pumpkin has been impaled onto the spire of North Miami Public Library by a group named Coxie's Army. This has become a celebrated tradition, and is often accompanied by the hanging of a poem at the library's entrance.

At the University of Montana, a pumpkin has been placed on the spire of the Main Hall every October since 1995. These pranks resulted in arrests on charges of trespassing in 2004 and 2016.

== See also ==
- Hacks at the Massachusetts Institute of Technology
