= Chess Monthly =

Chess Monthly may refer to:

- The Chess Monthly (American magazine), New York, edited by Daniel Willard Fiske & Paul Morphy, published from 1857 to 1861
- The Chess Monthly (British magazine), London, edited by Leopold Hoffer & Johannes Zukertort, published from 1879 to 1896
- Maxwell Macmillan Chess Monthly (1991), continues Pergamon Chess and CHESS magazine

== See also ==
- List of chess periodicals
