= Southworth Library (Dryden, New York) =

- U.S. National Register of Historic Places
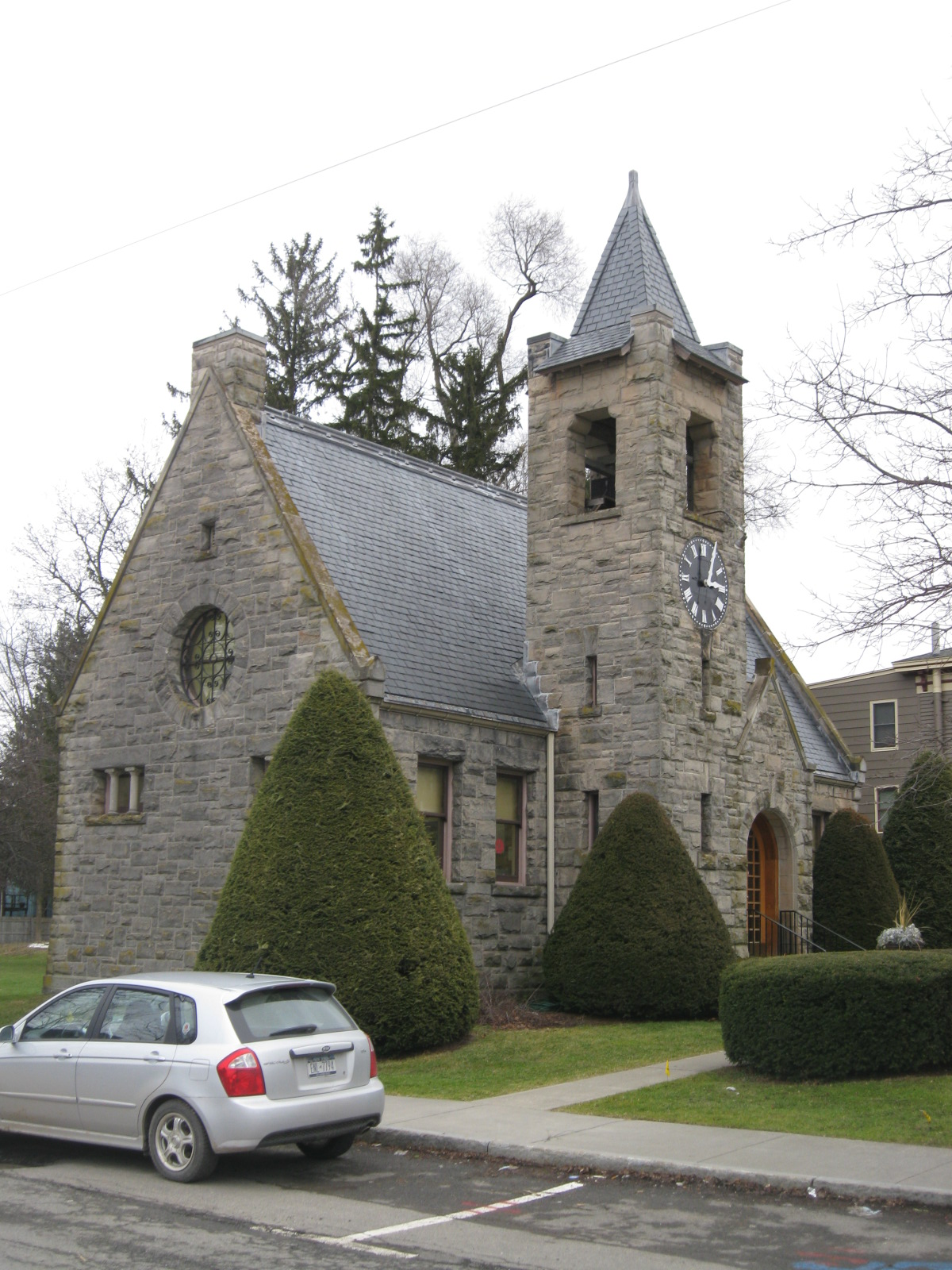
- Southworth Library in January 2010

- Location within New York Location within the United States
- Location: 24 W. Main St., Dryden, New York
- Coordinates: 42°29′26″N 76°17′58″W
- Area: less than one acre
- Built: 1894
- Architects: Miller, William Henry; Allington, J. & Son
- MPS: Dryden Village MRA
- NRHP reference No.: 84003195
- Added to NRHP: June 08, 1984

Southworth Library is a historic library building located at Dryden in Tompkins County, New York. It is a 1 1/2-story masonry building with a steeply pitched gable roof. It features a prominent bell tower with a Seth Thomas clock and circular windows include carved stone gargoyles. It is a distinctive, small scale example of Eclectic style civic architecture. It was designed with open grid flooring in stack rooms to facilitate air circulation and two reading rooms. It was listed on the National Register of Historic Places in 1984.

The library was founded by Jennie McGraw. It opened in an existing building on South and Main Streets on September 25, 1884 and later in a building constructed for the library in 1894. McGraw was the granddaughter of John Southworth of Dryden, who became a millionaire working as a farmer. She used money to create a memorial to her mother and grandfather by establishing a $30,000 trust fund to build and maintain a library in Dryden. On April 22, 1883, the Southworth Library Association was incorporated.

In 2010, the library opened the Lincoln Center Addition, adding 4,900 sq ft to the historic building. This addition was made possible by the sale of a handwritten copy of Abraham Lincoln's 1865 re-election acceptance speech. The document sold for $3.4 million, becoming the highest price paid for an American historical document at auction.
