= Jennie McGraw =

American philanthropist (1840–1881)

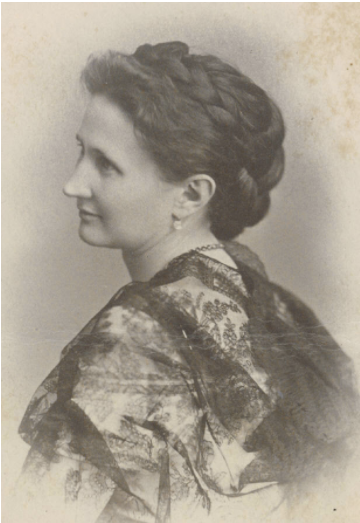
- An 1861 illustration of McGraw
- Born: September 14, 1840; Dryden, New York, U.S.
- Died: September 30, 1881 (aged 41); Ithaca, New York, U.S.
- Monuments: McGraw Tower
- Known for: Being a millionaire philanthropist to Cornell University; Founding Southworth Library
- Spouse: Willard Fiske (m. 1880)
- Father: John McGraw

Jennie McGraw, also Jennie McGraw Fiske (September 14, 1840 – September 30, 1881), was a millionaire philanthropist to Cornell University along with her parents John McGraw and Rhoda Charlotte Southworth. In 1868, she gave the university a set of chimes. The first tune played at every Cornell Chimes morning concert is the "Cornell Changes", also known as the "Jennie McGraw Rag". They continue to be played every day from McGraw Tower on the campus. She was also the founder of the Southworth Library in Dryden, New York. Upon her death, she left a significant bequest to Cornell University. Her will designated monies for a library, developing McGraw Hall, a student health center, and additional monies to be used as the university wished. She was married when she was 39 to professor and librarian Willard Fiske, but lived less than two years following the wedding ceremony.

== Early life ==
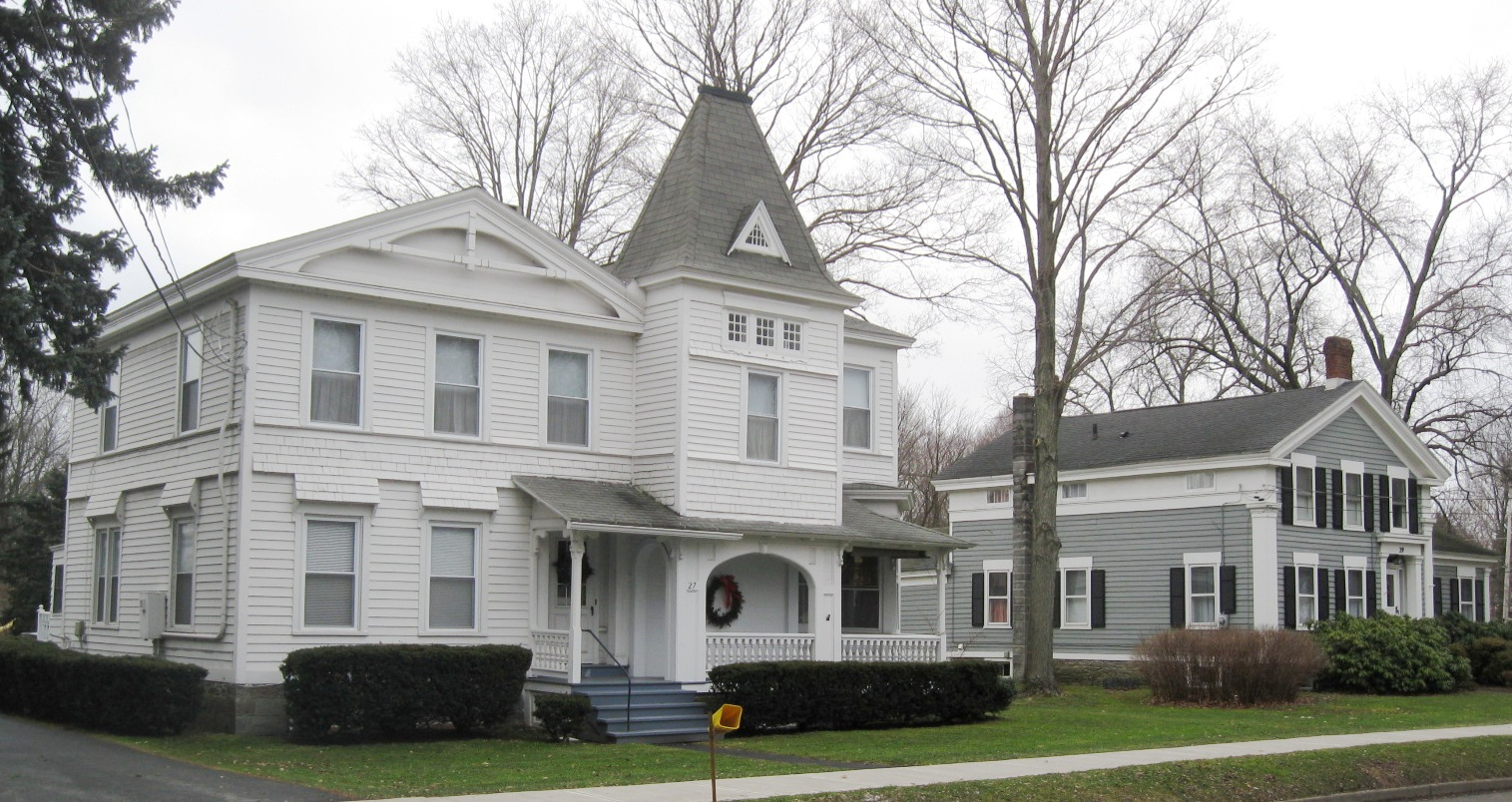
Dryden Historic District

McGraw was born September 14, 1840, in Dryden, New York to Rhoda Southworth and John McGraw a self-made industrialist and millionaire. She was born in a house near the Southworth estate of her maternal grandfather, John Southworth, who was a farmer and millionaire. Rhoda McGraw died of tuberculosis in 1847.

By the time she was 10 years old, John father moved them from Dryden. He married a second time to Nancy Amelia Southworth, Rhoda's sister, and the family lived in Westchester County, New York. Nancy died of tuberculosis, like her sister, in 1857. The McGraws moved to Ithaca in 1862 and John married a widow, Jane P. Turner Bates.

McGraw was educated at Canandaigua, New York, and, at about 18 years of age, at Pelham Priory in New Rochelle in Westchester County. She studied standard subjects as well as French composition, Latin, "social science", singing, and music. She could dance and play the spinet. Jane McGraw co-founded the Ladies' Union Benevolent Society. Jennie helped run a home for women over the age of 65. One wing of McGraw House continues the mission to provide housing for women who cannot afford to provide their own house.

== Early adulthood ==
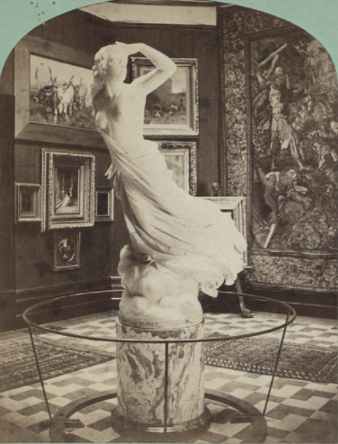
Merope in the art gallery of the McGraw-Fiske Mansion

When she was 22, McGraw made her debut into Ithaca's society. She was sent on her first Grand Tour of Europe in 1859 by her father, who desired that she receive a classical education. She went on two other major trips to Europe.

She gave Cornell its set of chimes which have been rung daily since the University's opening ceremony on October 7, 1868. They were first installed in a temporary wooden structure and later in the McGraw Tower. Every morning concert includes a playing of the "Jennie McGraw Rag", also known as "Cornell Changes".

Her father discouraged suitors. Willard Fiske met Jennie in 1869 and secretly wrote love poems about her. John McGraw died on May 4, 1877. The History of Dryden states that her step-mother received $2 million from his will, while the History of Cornell University and Ithaca Times state that McGraw inherited most of her father's estate. McGraw inherited a trust of $500,000.

When her grandfather Southworth died, she also inherited the money that would have otherwise have gone to her mother. She hired architect William Henry Miller to build a mansion in 1878. Two years later, construction began on what had been Cornell University land between Fall River and University Avenue in Ithaca. The house had Gothic architectural details like bartizans, turrets, and donjon keeps.

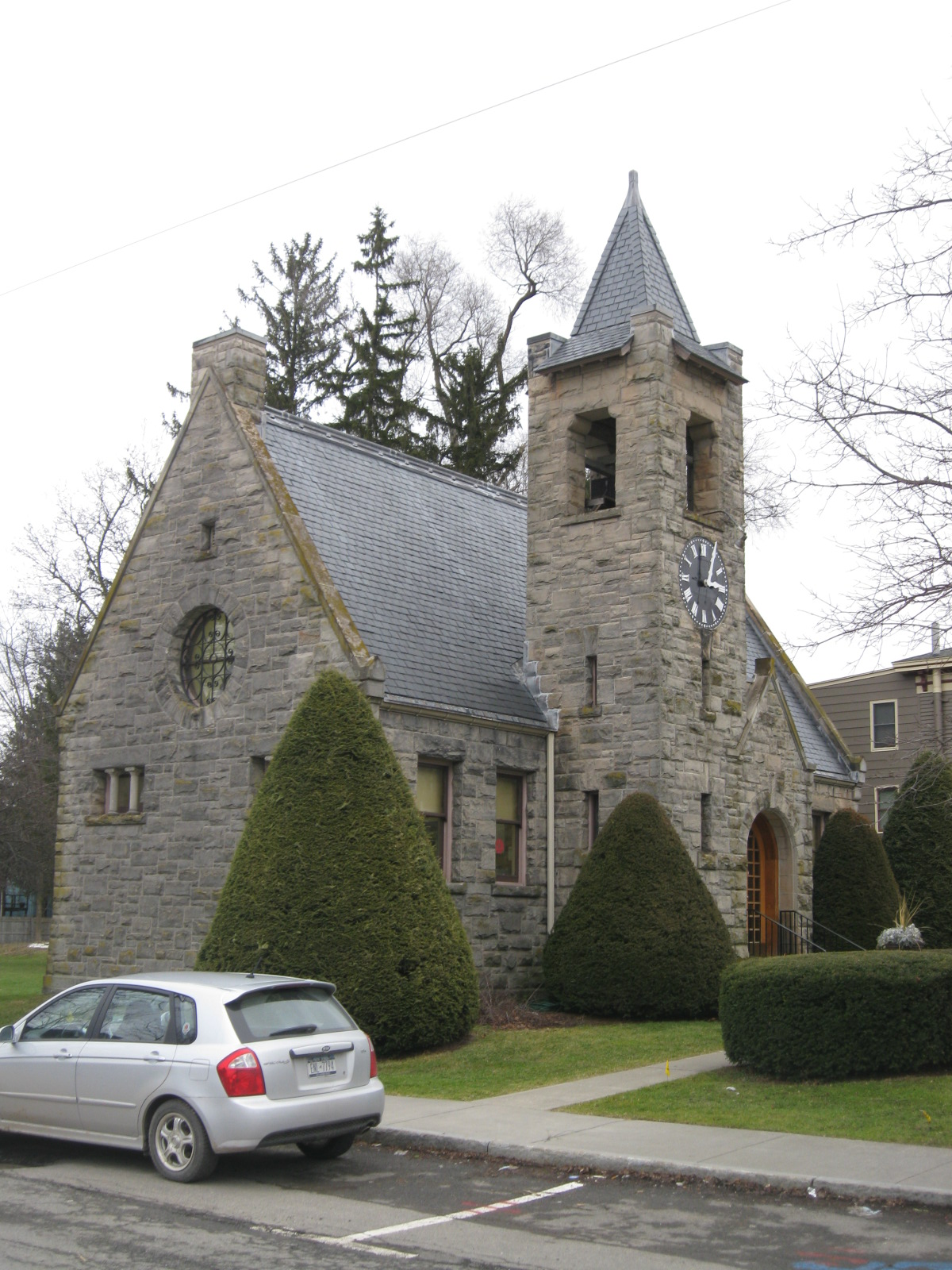
Southworth Library, Dryden, New York established by Jennie McGraw in memory of her mother, Rhoda Southworth McGraw, and her grandfather, John Southworth

Like her father, who did not have the benefit of a good education, McGraw believed in the importance of the creating a "world-class university library". She was the founder of the Southworth Library in Dryden. It opened in an existing building in 1884 and in a building constructed for the library in 1894.

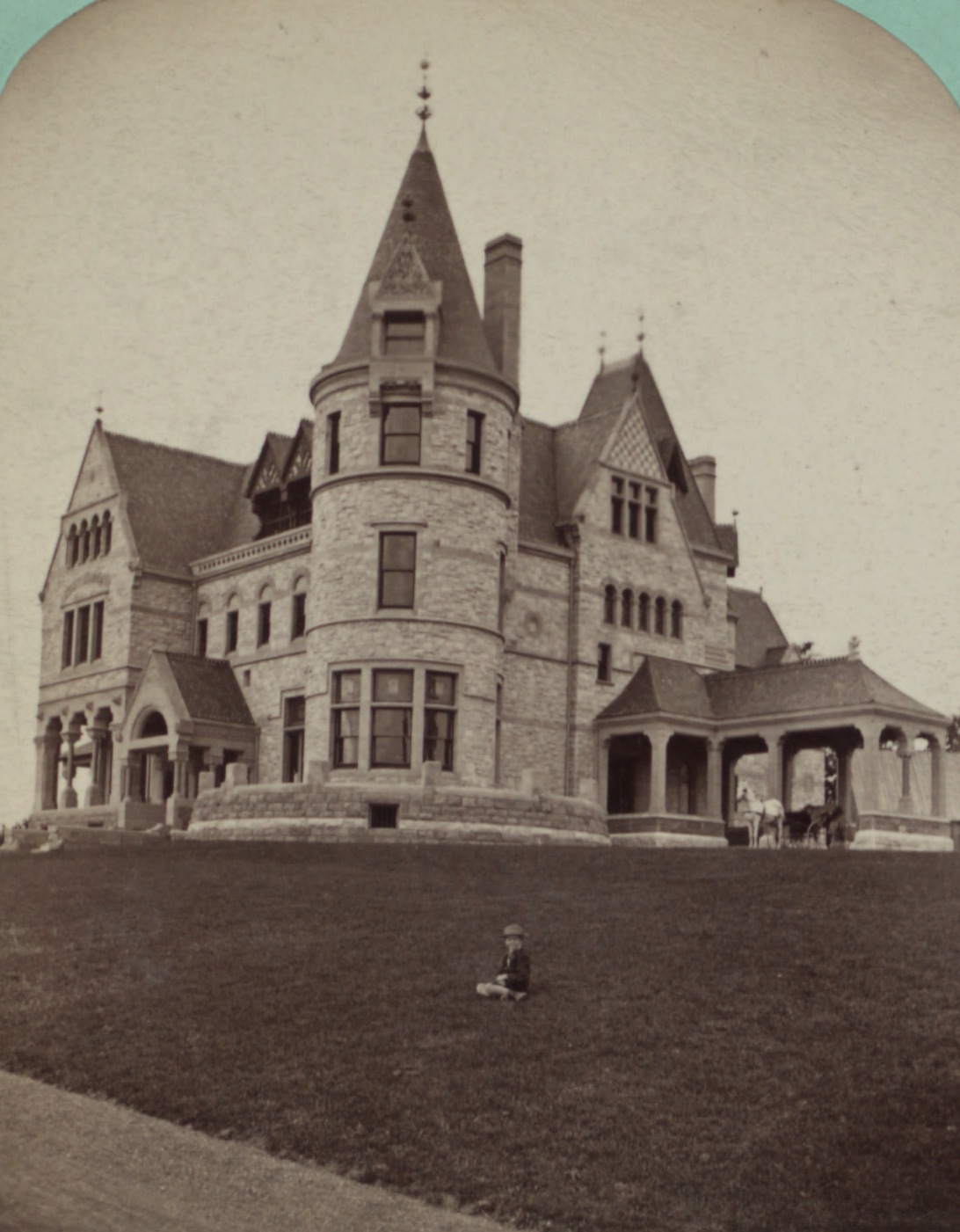
The McGraw-Fiske Mansion

== Marriage and death ==
She took her last trip to Europe in 1878, in the hopes that the more temperate climate there would help her recuperate from tuberculosis; since she was a young girl, McGraw had "weak lungs". During her trip, she purchased art and furniture for the new mansion, but her health deteriorated significantly during her travels. She met up with a friend, Willard Fiske, in Venice, whom she married in Berlin in August 1880 or on July 14, 1880. Fiske was a professor of north European languages and a librarian. He had been in love with her for some time, but was reticent to express his feelings for fear of being considered a fortune hunter. Before the wedding ceremony, Fiske signed away any rights to her property. After they were married, the couple traveled up the Nile in November 1880 and McGraw became seriously ill. They went to France in June 1881, where she was told that she only had a few weeks to live.

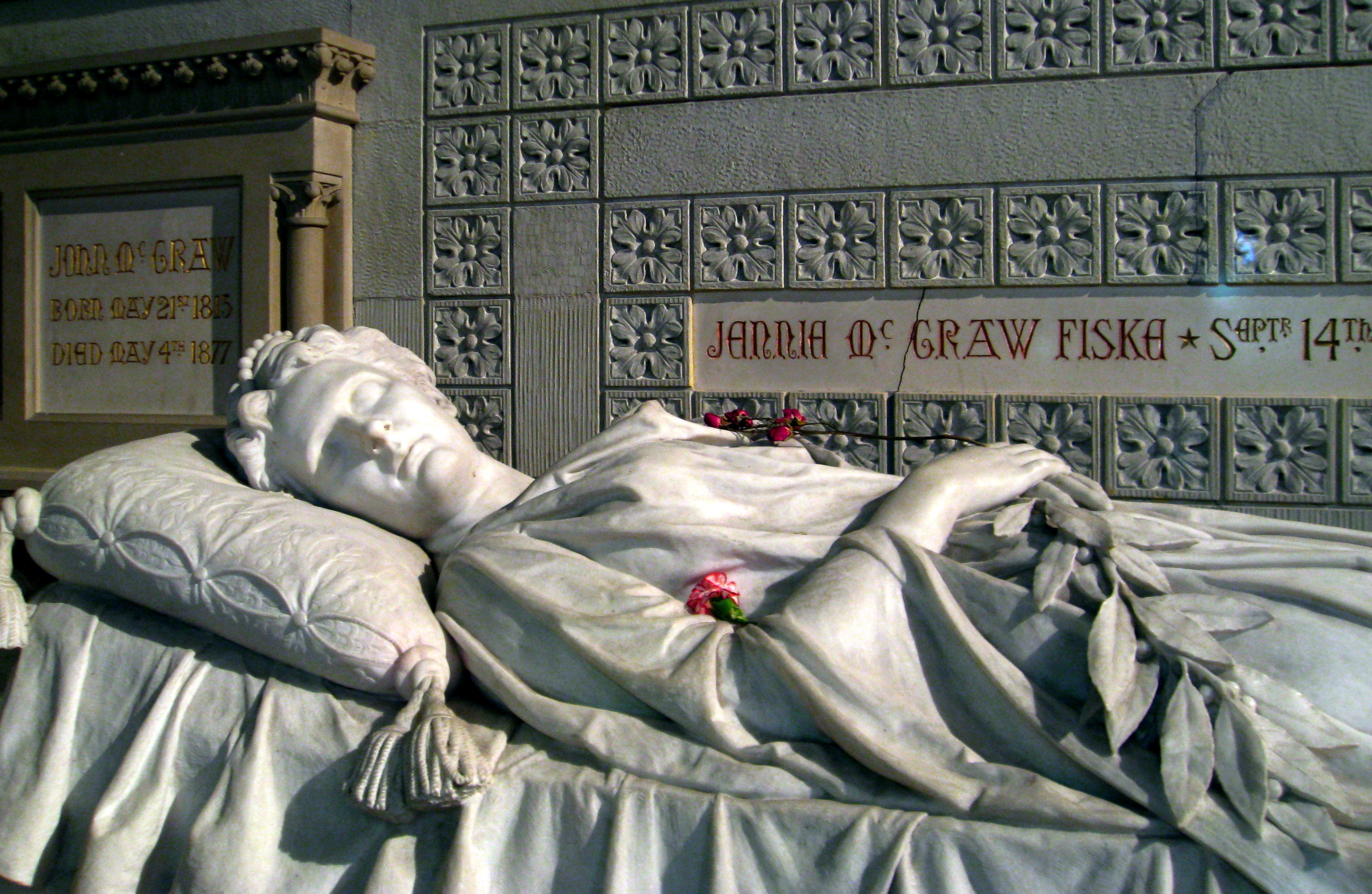
Jennie McGraw Fiske's sarcophagus, Sage Chapel, Cornell University

The Fiskes returned to the United States in early September. Quite ill, she was taken to Fiske's house, but was driven by her mansion and she was pleased to see how it had been completed. She died on September 30, 1881 and was interred in the Memorial Antechapel of the Sage Chapel at Cornell University. At her death, she had $2 million in property and $250,000 remaining in her trust.

Ten years after her death, Willard Fiske sold the mansion and had the furniture and household furnishings auctioned. The house was later purchased by Edward and Clarence Wyckoff for the Chi Psi fraternity. It was destroyed in 1906 during a fire that also took the lives of seven people.

== Legacy ==
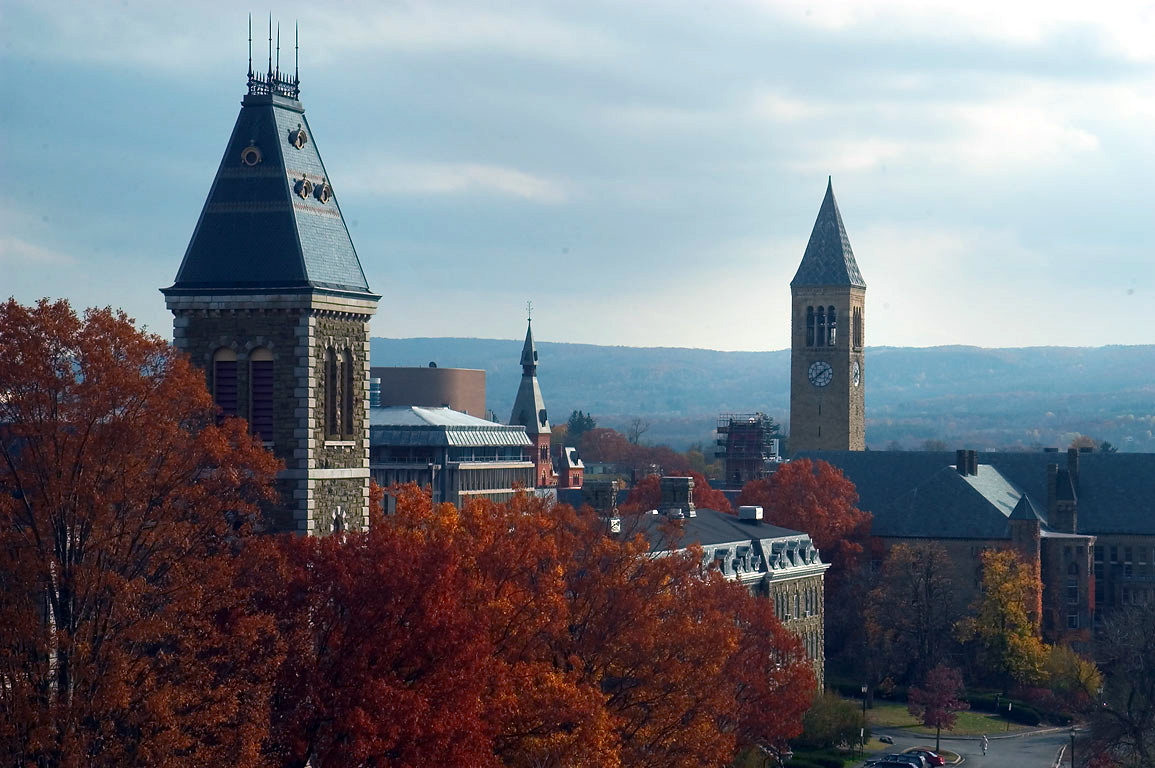
McGraw Hall and McGraw Tower

In her will, she gave away $300,000 (equivalent to $10 million in 2025) to her husband, $550,000 ($16.7 million) to her brother Joseph and his children, $200,000 ($6.7 million) to Cornell for a library, $50,000 ($1.7 million) for improvements to McGraw Hall, $40,000 ($1.3 million) for a student hospital, and the remainder of her property to the University, estimated at at least $1 million ($33.4 million), for whatever use it saw fit.

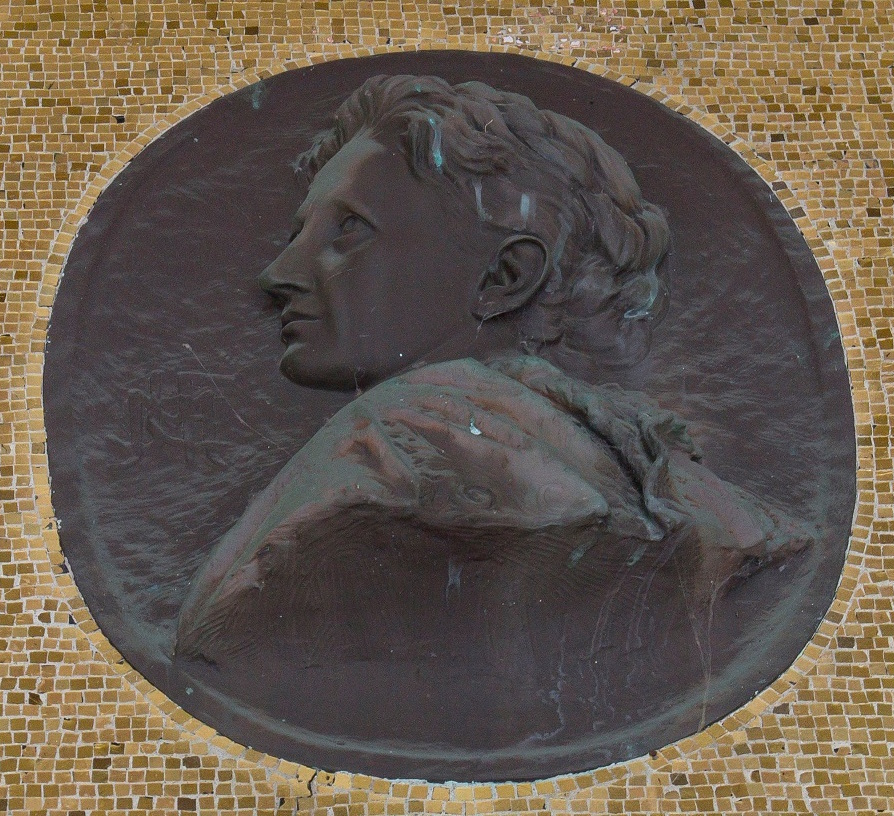
Anne Whitney, Jennie McGraw Fiske, bronze relief, 1891, Uris Library, Cornell University

The University's charter limited its property holdings to $3 million, but a New York State law on May 12, 1882, removed the limit. Another state law disallowed more than one half of a woman's estate go to charity if she was married when she died. Fiske became quite angry when he learned of the law and that it had not been mentioned to him by the executor of the estate. Fiske launched a legal assault to reacquire the money that the university could not accept, known as The Great Will Case. The case went to the US Supreme Court. Once the case was settled, Fiske received about $500,000, the McGraws about $1 million, and the university the rest of the estate. When he died in 1904, Fiske left most of his estate, including his personal library, to the university.

Today, McGraw's name graces numerous places and things on Cornell's campus. The central tower in McGraw Hall was constructed in order to house the chimes donated by McGraw; they now reside in McGraw Tower next to Uris Library.
