= William Henry Miller (architect) =

American architect

William Henry Miller (1848–1922) was an American architect based in Ithaca, New York.

== Biography ==
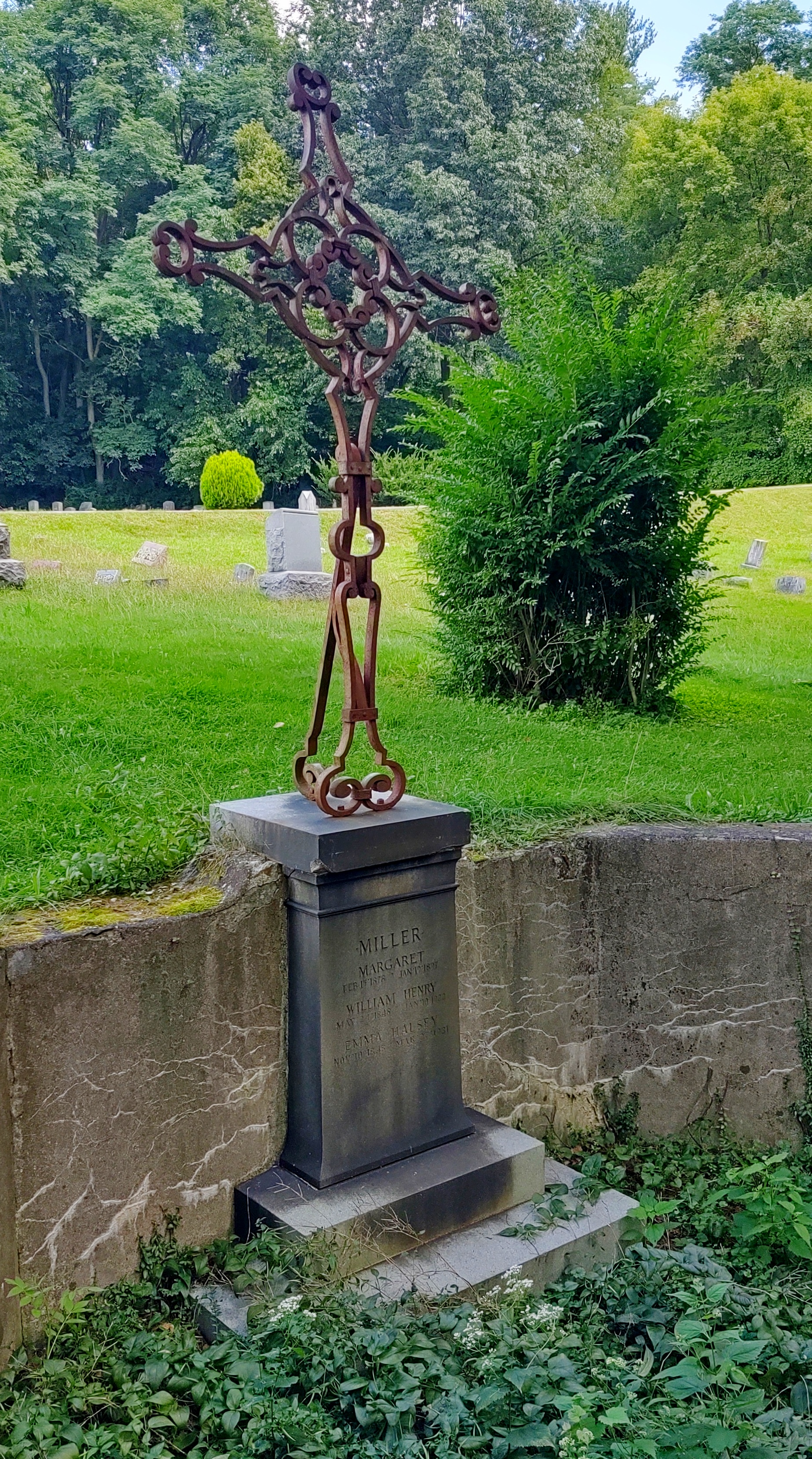
Miller's grave in Lake View Cemetery in Ithaca, New York

Born in 1848 in Trenton, New York, Miller attended Cornell University from 1868 to 1870, but departed without graduating one year before the College of Architecture was created. Cornell refers to Miller as "Cornell’s first student of architecture," and his portrait hangs in the Uris Library lobby, which he designed.

Miller married Emma Halsey of Ithaca in 1876. He is buried at Lake View Cemetery in Ithaca, New York under a distinctive 16th century wrought-iron cross, and across from the Franklin C. Cornell family mausoleum he designed for his longtime benefactors, the Cornell family.

== Works ==
Miller was the foremost architect in Ithaca and at Cornell University for many years, designing over seventy buildings on and off campus including 9 fraternity houses. Among his buildings for Cornell were the President's House, Barnes Hall, University Library, Boardman Hall, infirmaries, and Prudence Risley Hall. In 1878 he was commissioned by the Cornell University chapter of Alpha Delta Phi to build them a chapter house. It was the first building ever to be designed and built specifically for use by a fraternity as their lodge and residence. Among his other fraternity houses were Deke House, Sigma Chi's chapter house, Chi Phi Lodge, and two former mansions: "Greystone Mansion," originally owned by silent movie actress Irene Castle, and the Jennie McGraw-Willard Fiske mansion, modeled on a French chateau, which became the Chi Psi fraternity house and burned down in 1906.

Some of his works in Ithaca include:

- Edward G. Wyckoff mansion in Cornell Heights
- Clinton House, 120 North Cayuga St (c. 1830)
- Henry W. Sage mansion, 603 E. Seneca St (1876)
- Stowell Mansion, now William Henry Miller Inn (1880–1881)
- St. Catherine's Greek Orthodox Church, 120 W. Seneca St (1882–1884)
- 316 East Court Street (1883–1884)
- Livermore Memorial Building aka Hoyt Mansion, aka United Way of Tompkins County 313 N. Aurora St (1890)
- Ithaca Savings Bank (1887; destroyed in the 1920s)
- First Baptist Church, 309 N. Cayuga St (1890–1891)
- First Unitarian Society of Ithaca and Parish House, 302 N. Aurora St (1893–1894)
- Mynderse and Elizabeth Van Cleef's family home, 660 Stewart Ave (1902)
- Robert H. Treman House, 640 Stewart Ave (1902), now the Kahin Center for Advanced Research on Southeast Asia
- Former Ithaca High School, 201 N. Cayuga St (1912–1914) (now Dewitt Mall)
- Cascadilla School
- the Stewart Street School
- and many other public and private buildings.

Among his non-Ithaca buildings were the main building of Wells College in Aurora, New York, the Toutorsky Mansion in Washington, D.C., built for US Supreme Court Justice Henry Billings Brown in Washington, D.C., in 1894, the Berkshire "cottage" Oronoque in Stockbridge, M.A., for Birdseye Blakeman in 1887, a villa on Carleton Island for Wyckoff's father, the typewriter magnate William O. Wyckoff, and Iviswold (1889) for David Brinkerfhoff Ivison, designed as an expansion of the Floyd W. Tomkins House in Rutherford, N.J. Iviswold is now part of the Rutherford campus of Felician College. Miller also designed two mansions on Rochester, New York's East Avenue (The Avenue of the Presidents) at 800 for Dr. John W. Whitbeck in 1887 and at 963 for Francis A. Macomber in 1888.

== Gallery ==
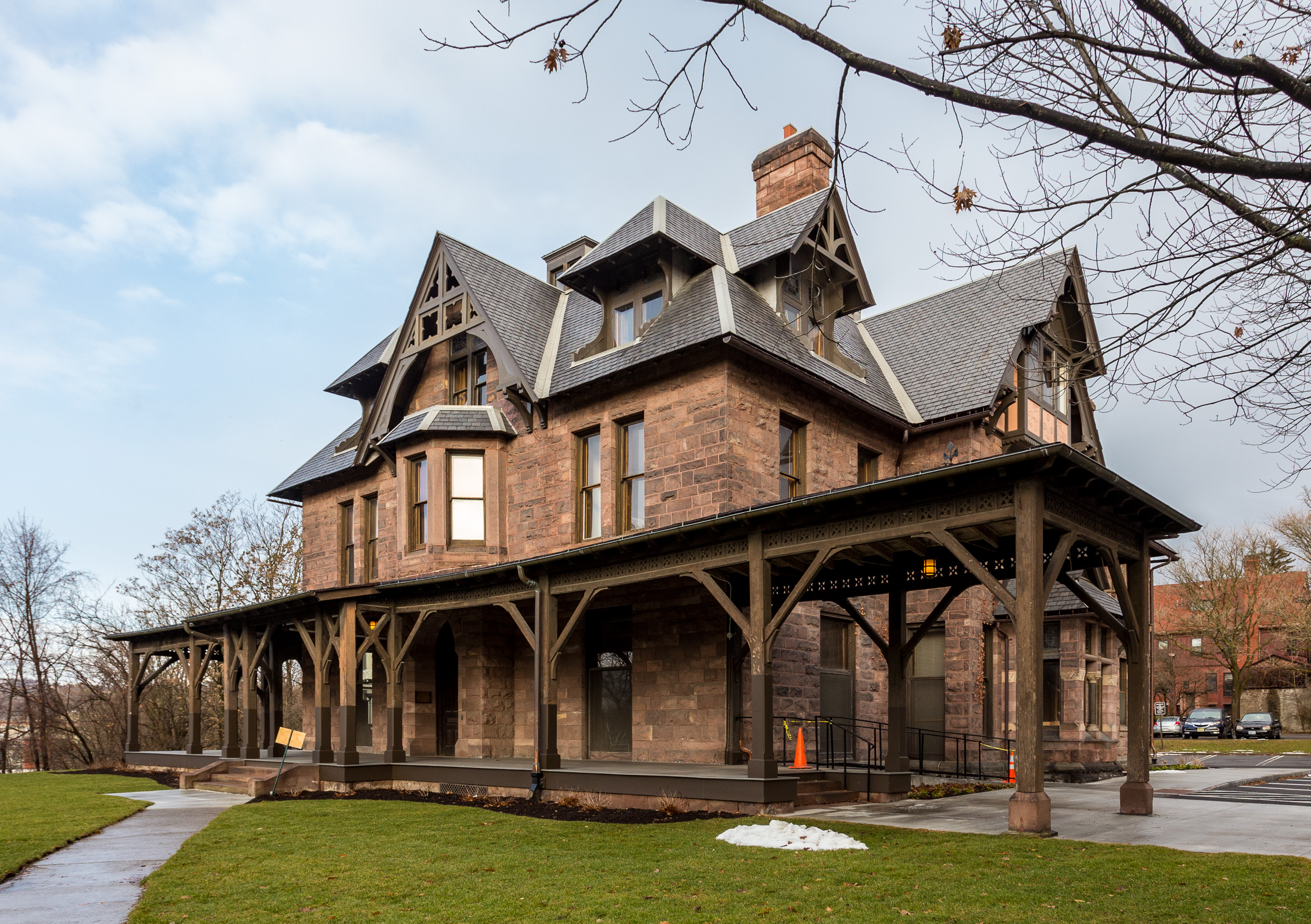
Henry W. Sage mansion (1876)

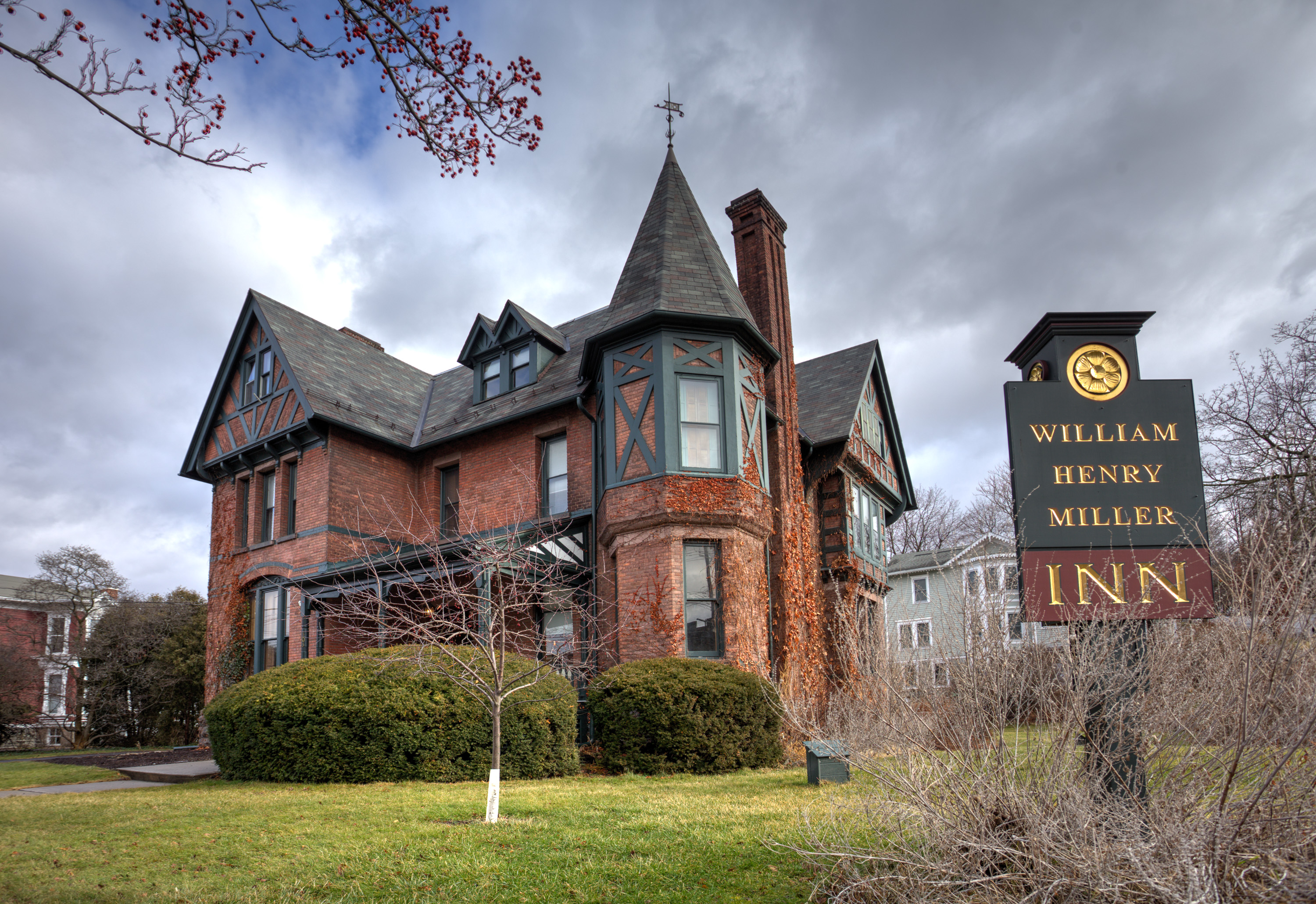
Stowell Family mansion (1878)

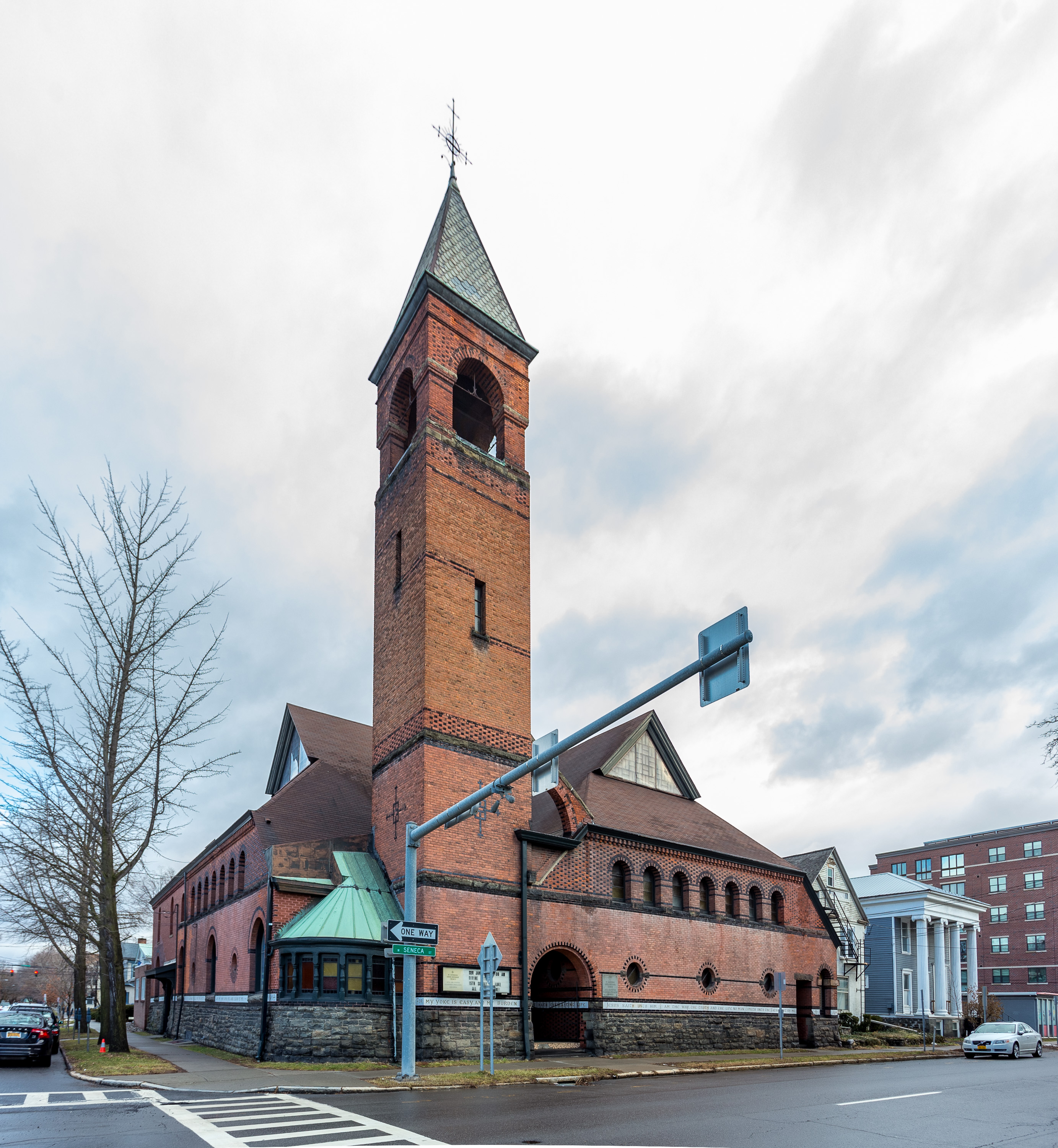
St. Catherine's Greek Orthodox Church (1882–1884)

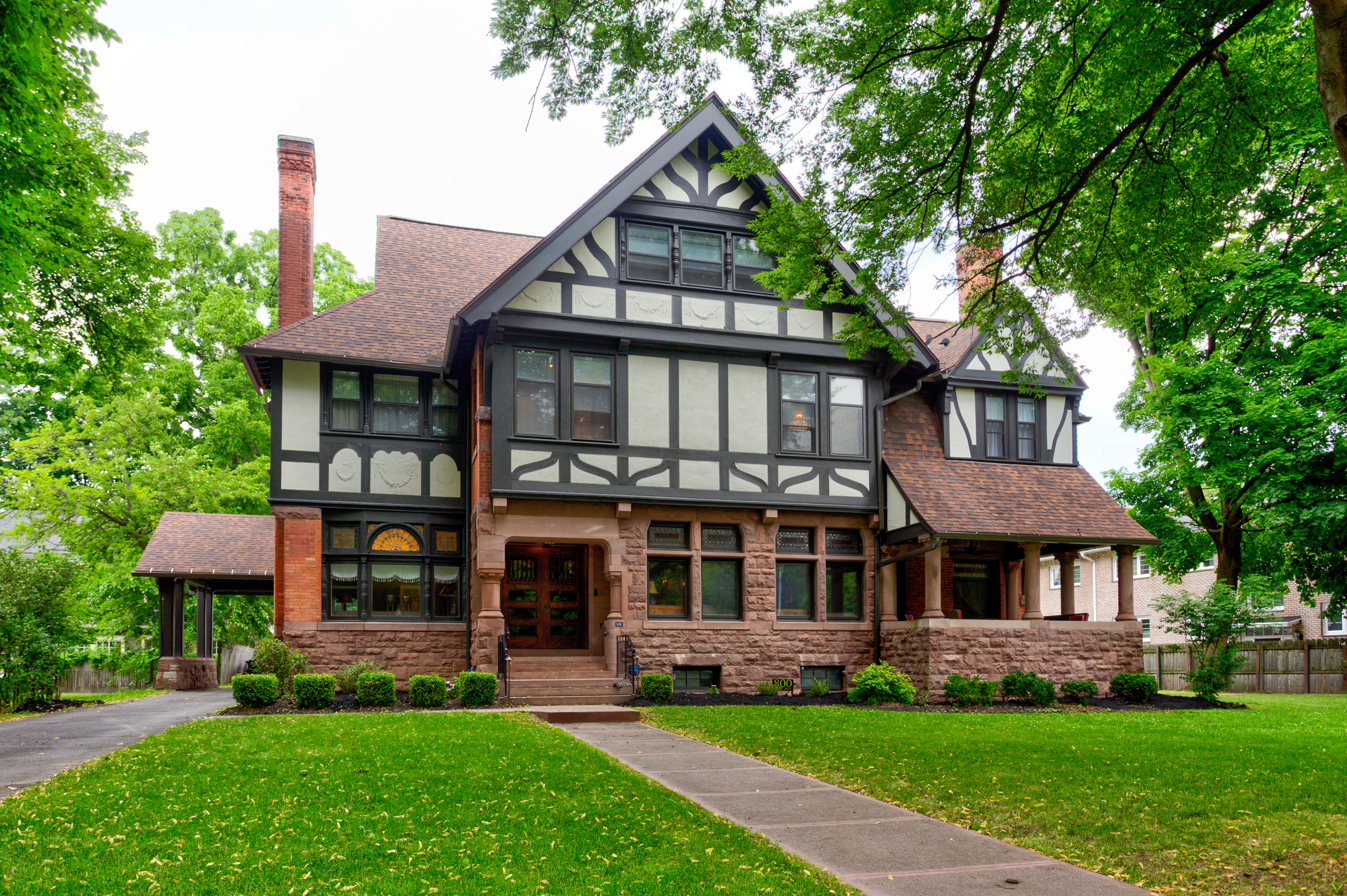
John W. Whitbeck house, Rochester, New York (1887)

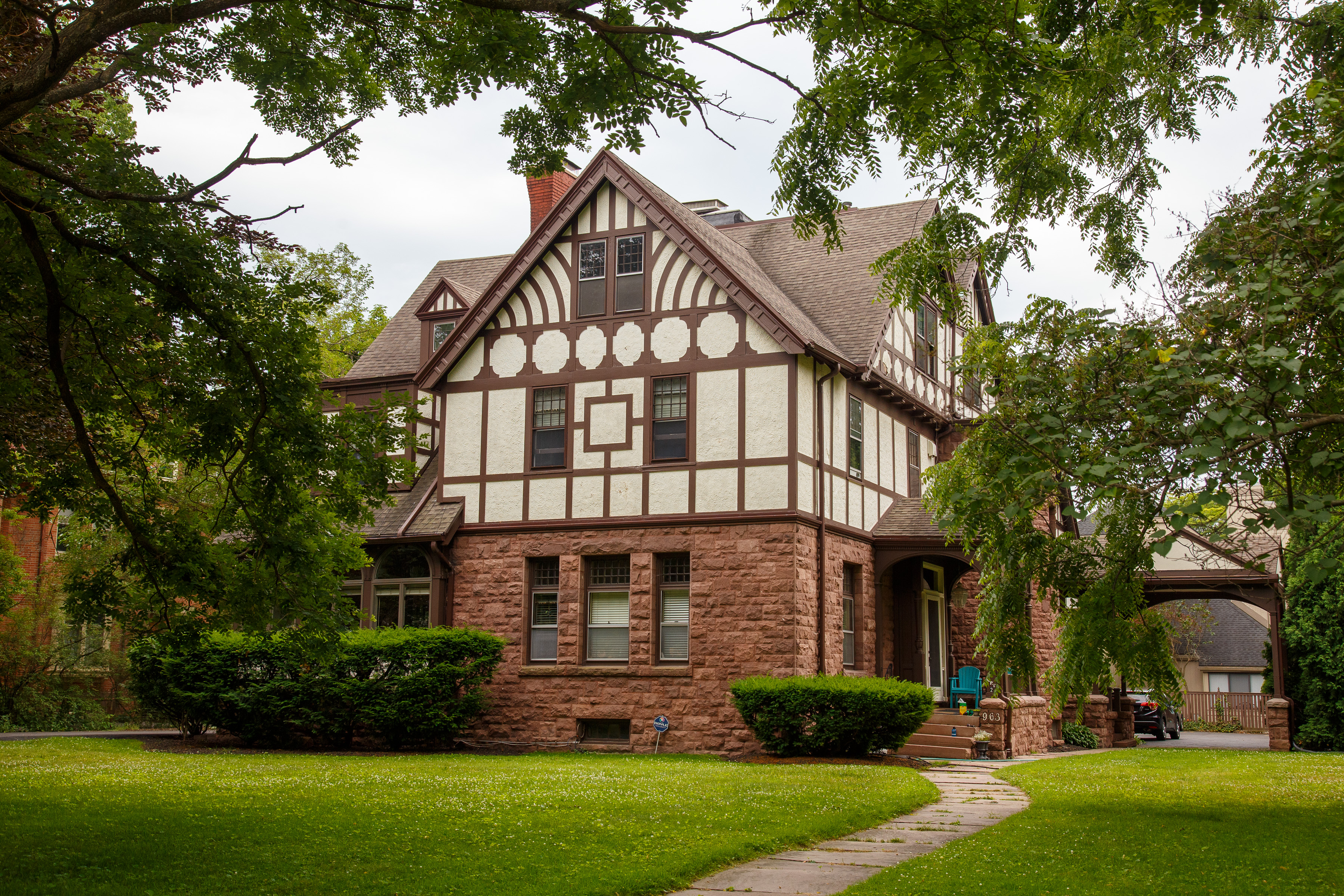
Francis A. Macomber House, Rochester (1888)

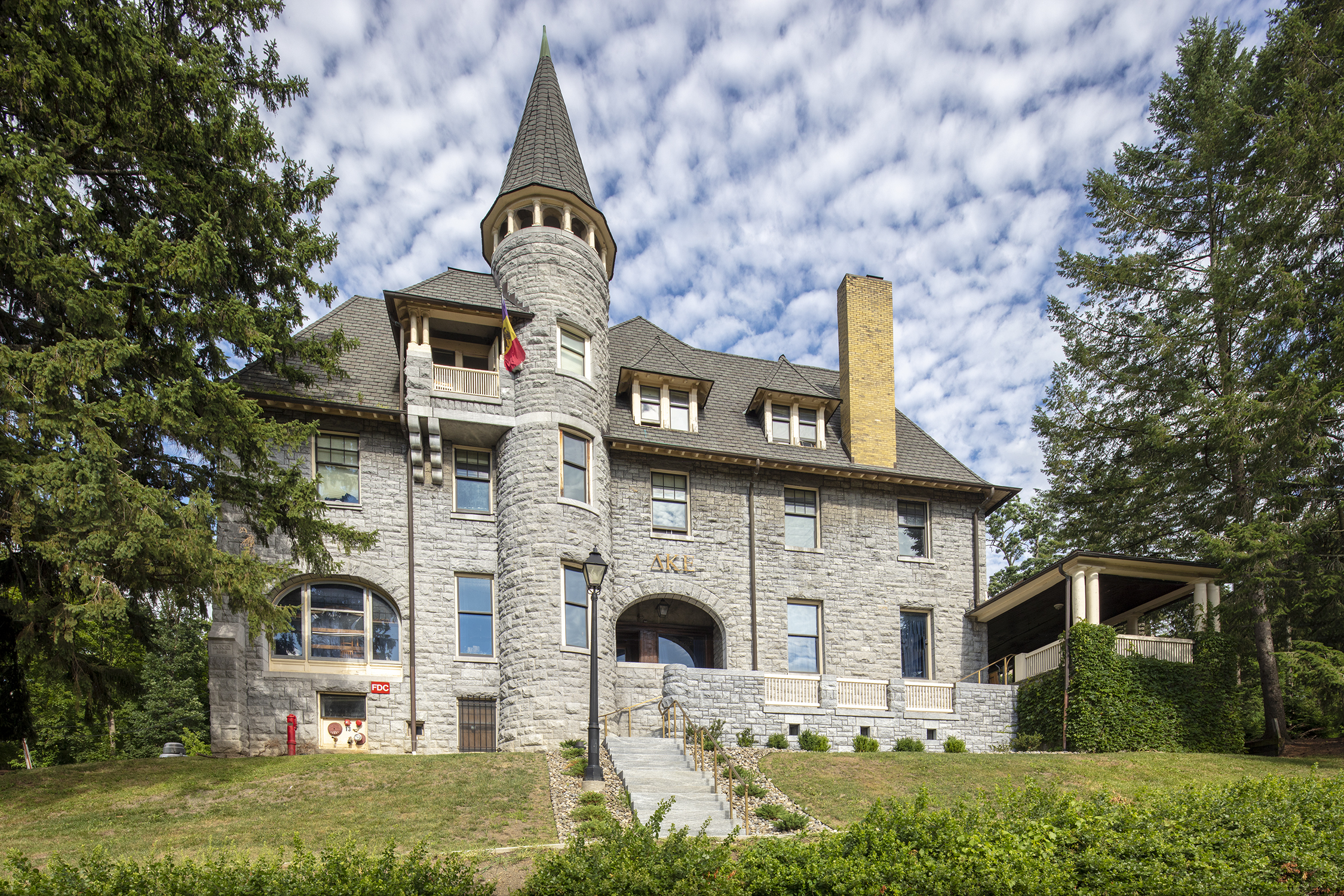
Deke House, Ithaca, New York (1893)

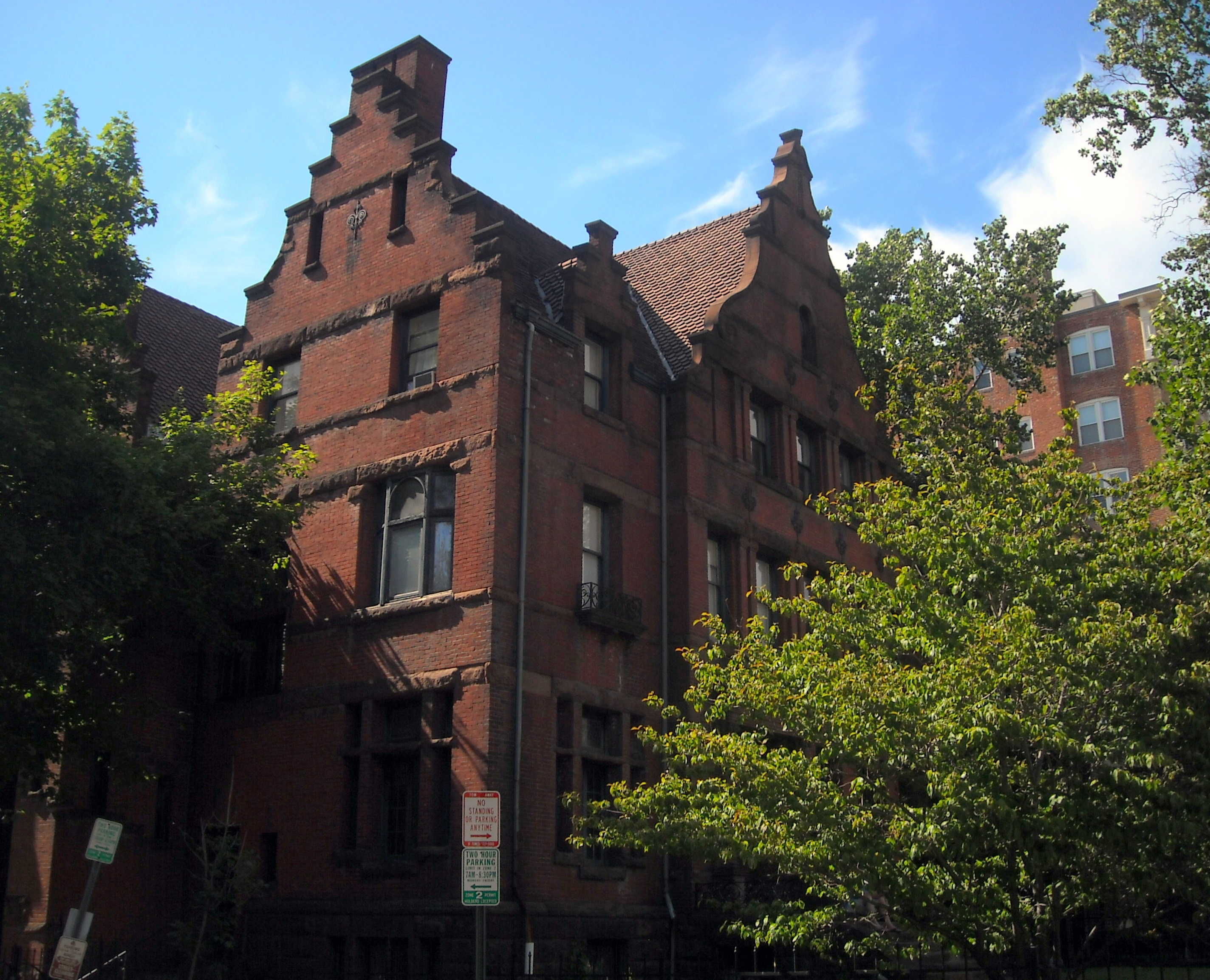
House of Justice Henry Billings Brown in Washington DC (1894)

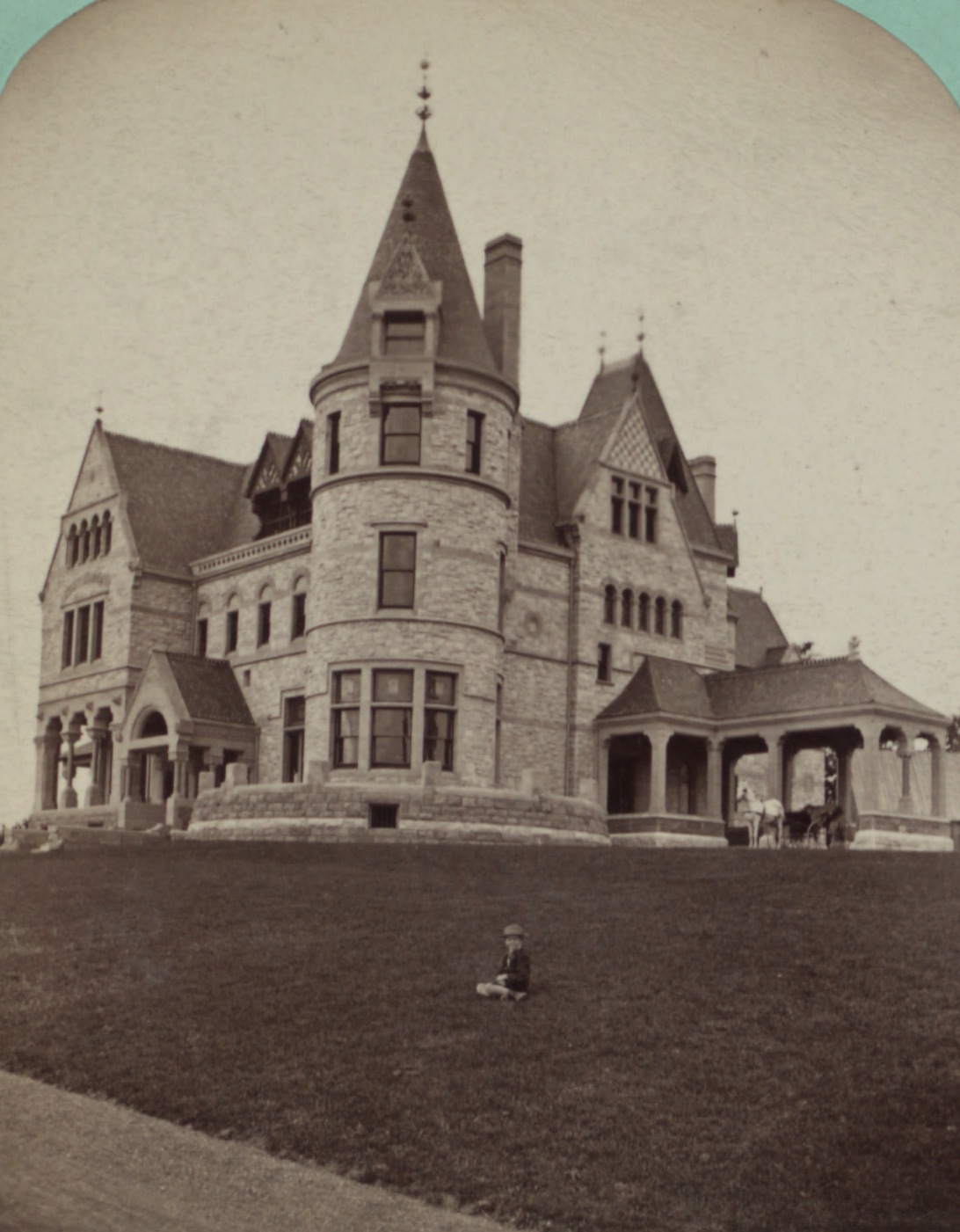
The McGraw-Fiske Mansion (1896)

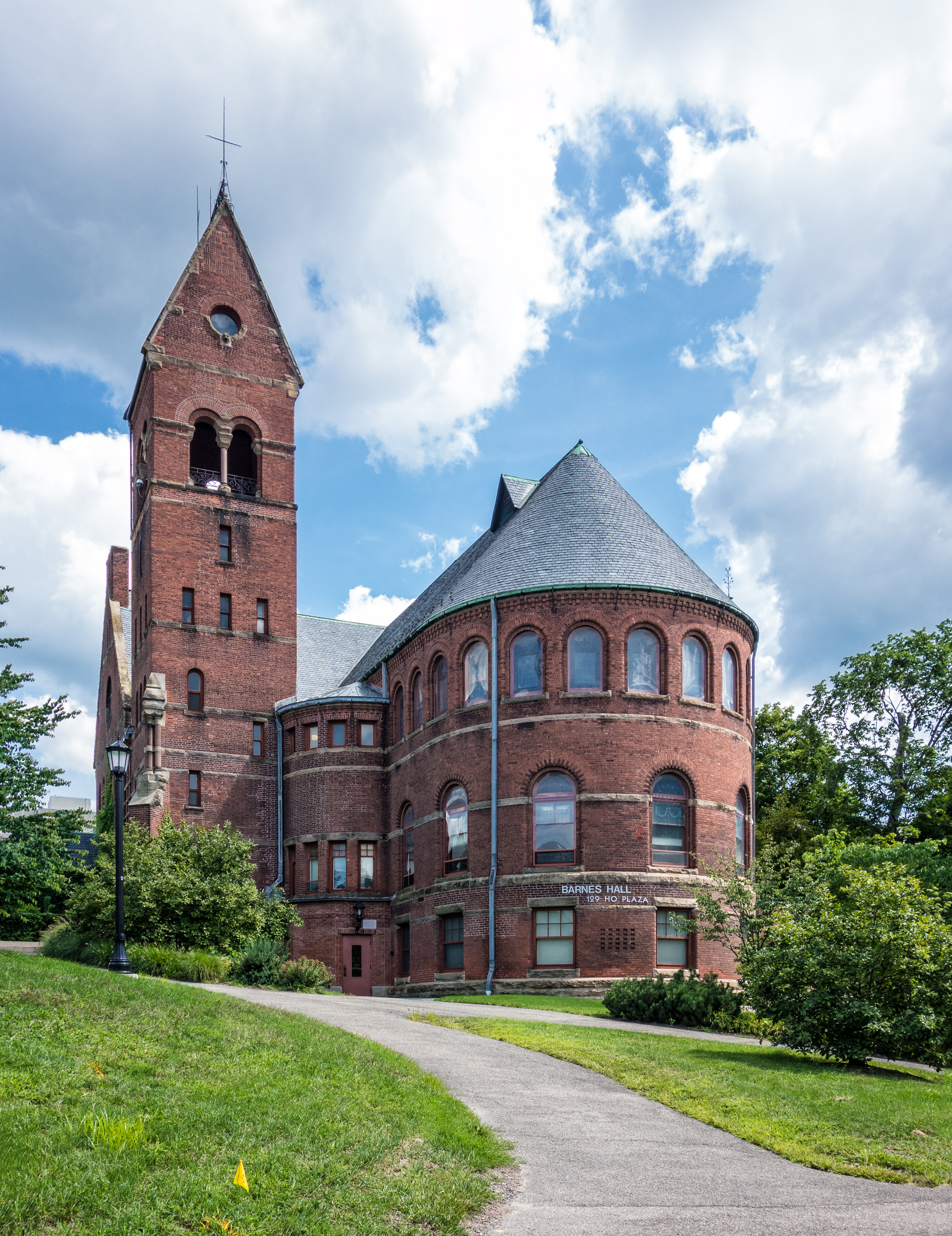
Barnes Hall, Cornell University (1897)

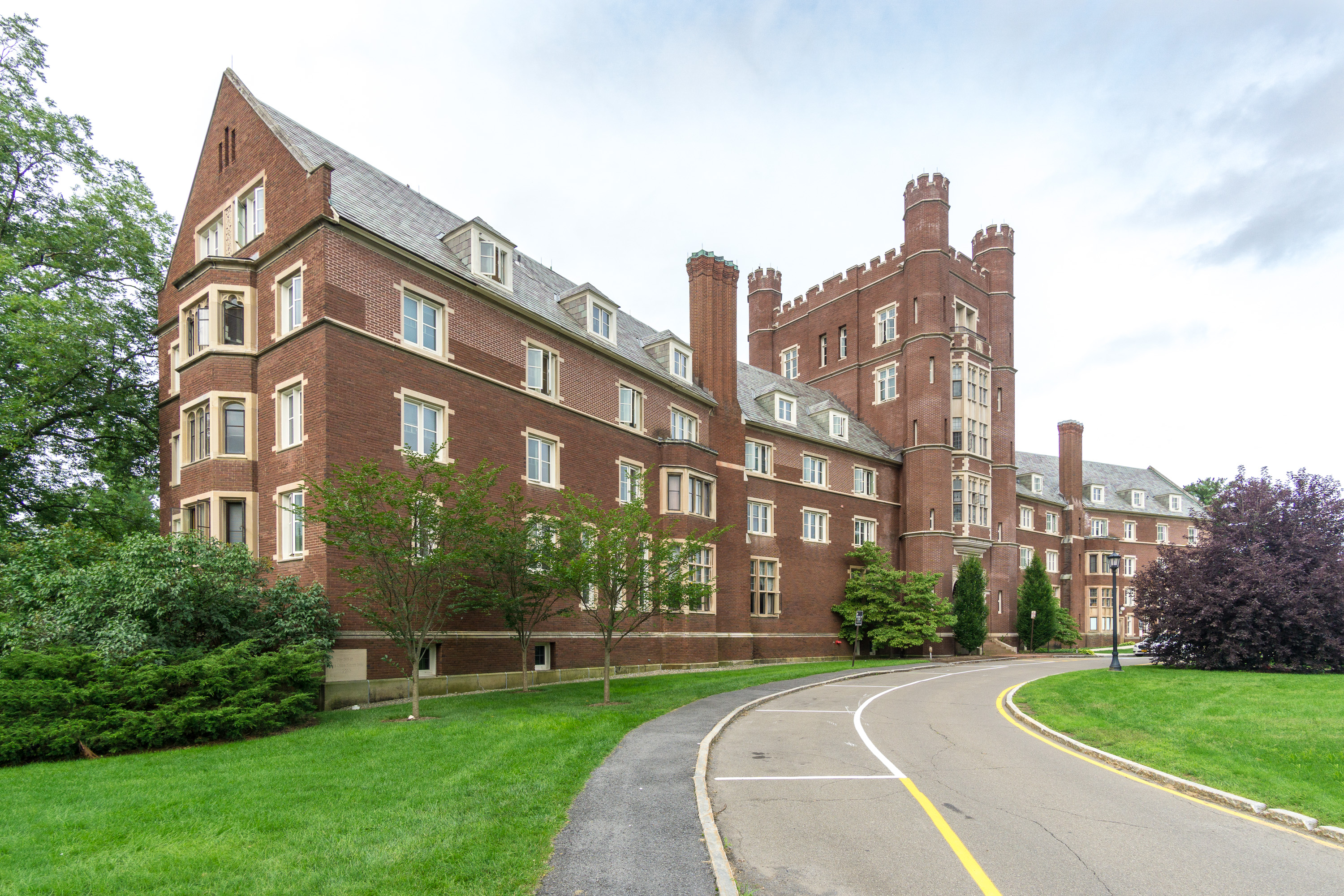
Risley Residential College, Cornell University (1913)

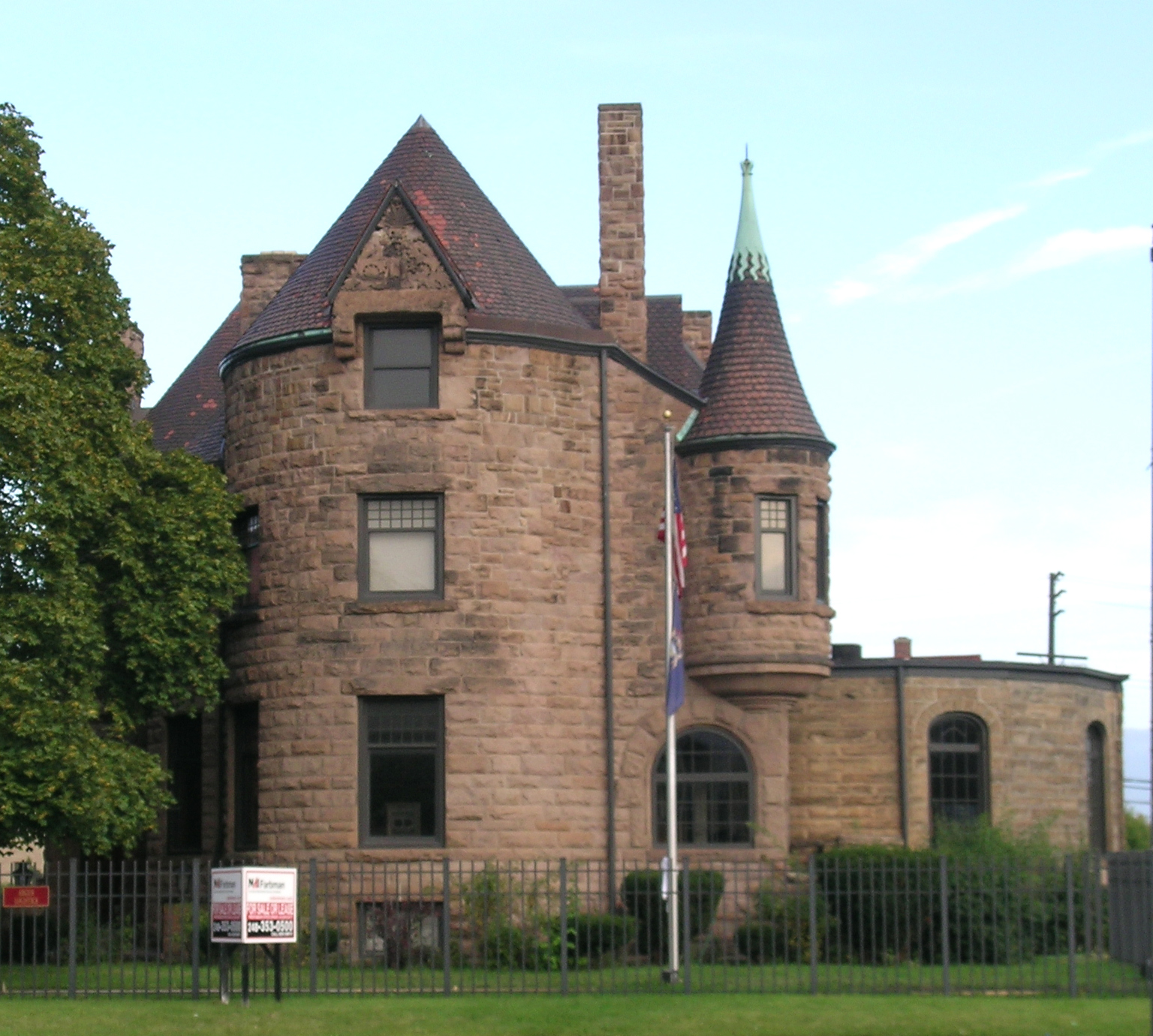
The William H. Wells House in Detroit, Michigan

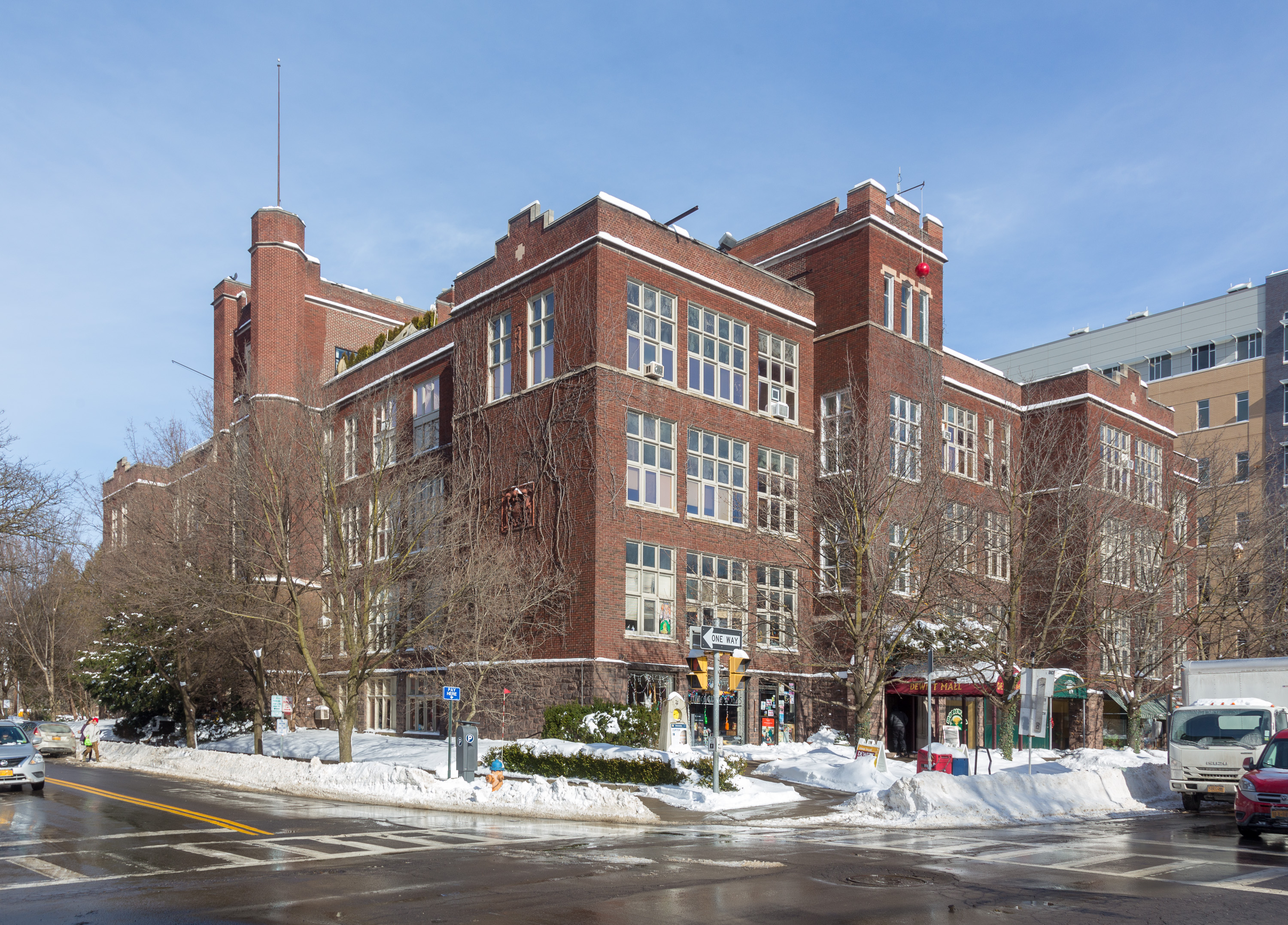
The former High School, now DeWitt Mall (1914)

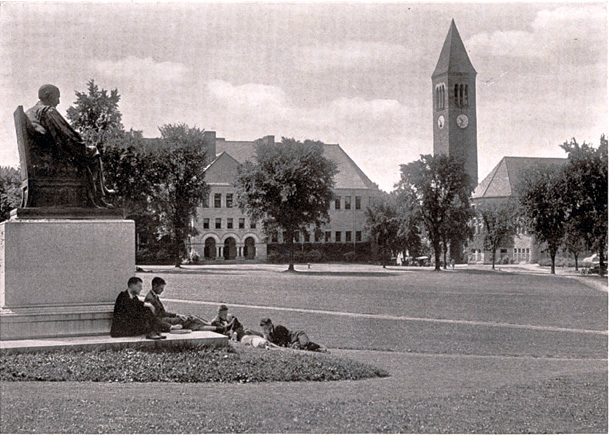
Boardman Hall (demolished in 1959) and Uris Library both designed by Miller
