= McGraw Tower =

Clock tower in Ithaca, New York

- McGraw Tower at Cornell University

- Location within New York

General information
- Type: Clock tower
- Location: Ithaca, New York, U.S.
- Coordinates: 42.44757°N 76.48505°W
- Completed: 1891

Height
- Height: 173 feet (53 m)

McGraw Tower is a masonry clock tower located on the campus of Cornell University in Ithaca, New York. The tower was known as Library Tower when it was first built but was renamed in 1961 in honor of either John McGraw, one of Cornell's original donors, or his daughter Jennie McGraw, the philanthropist in whose honor the tower and its adjacent library were originally commissioned by Henry W. Sage.

McGraw Tower has housed the Cornell Chimes, which Jennie McGraw donated to the university in 1868, since its construction finished in 1891. The bells were moved from McGraw Hall, a separate building, which had not been designed to support the weight of the bells. The Cornell Chimes were the first chimes housed and rung on an American college campus. The chimes play music three times each day during the school year. They also ring every fifteen minutes between 7:00 A.M. and 11:00 P.M.

== History ==
=== 19th century ===
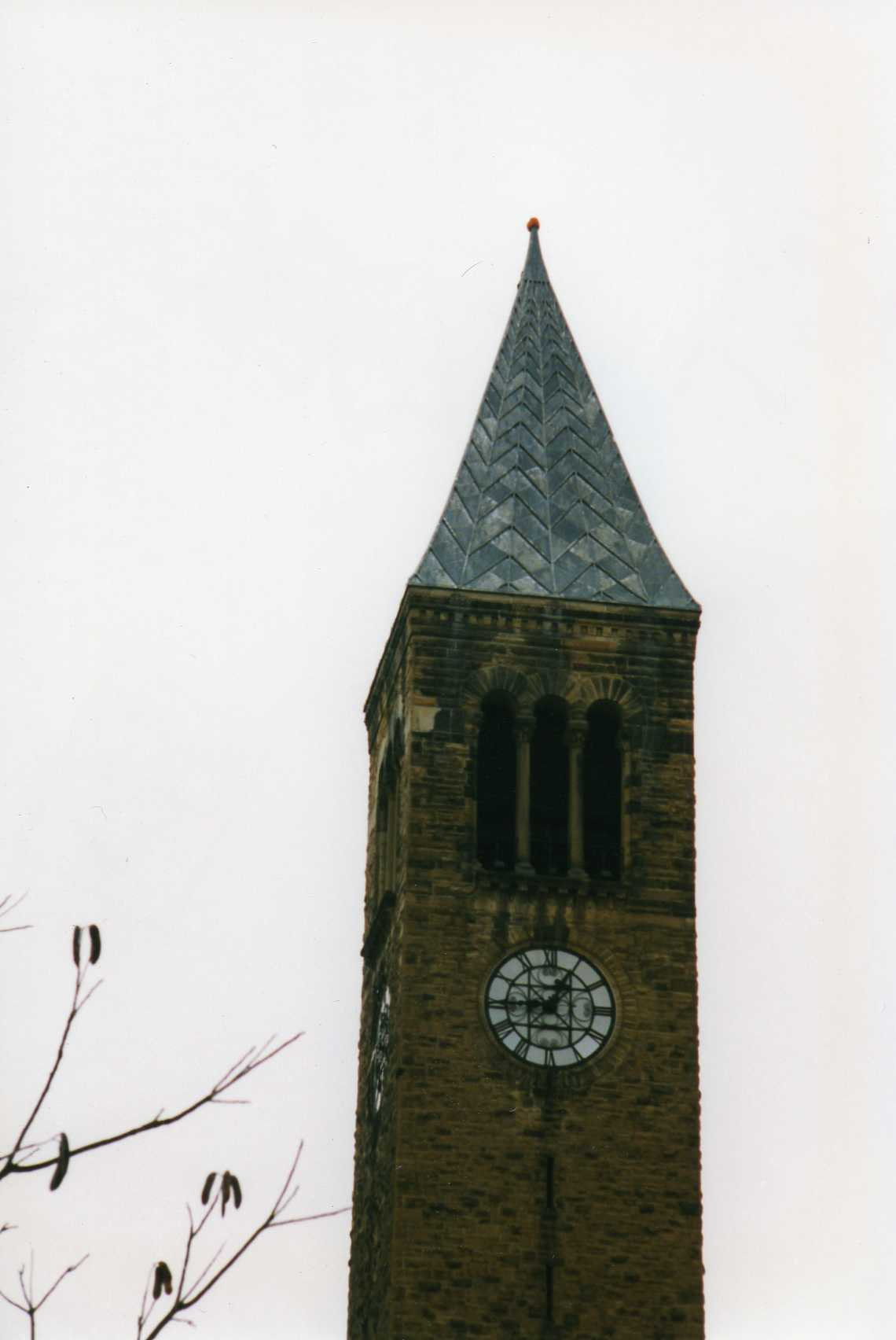
The pumpkin atop the tower on November 21, 1997; the prank would later be pulled again on October 20, 2023.

McGraw Tower was designed as part of Uris Library by William Henry Miller, and construction finished in 1891. The construction of the library and tower, then called the University Library, was funded by Henry W. Sage to be built in the memory of Jennie McGraw. Sage believed McGraw had intended to donate her estate to the construction of a library on Cornell's campus upon her death; however, this claim was contested by her husband, Cornell professor and librarian Willard Fiske. The university took Sage's view, leading to years of litigation, but eventually, the Supreme Court ruled in favor of Fiske.

=== 20th century ===
==== Pumpkin prank ====
On October 8, 1997, passersby noticed a pumpkin on top of the tower's spire. Because of the danger involved in retrieving it, administrators decided to leave it until it rotted and fell off. However, the pumpkin rapidly dried out in the cold air and remained on the tower until it was removed with a crane on March 13, 1998 (it was planned that Provost Don M. Randel would remove it, but in a practice run the crane basket was blown by a gust of wind and knocked the pumpkin off). Who placed the pumpkin atop the tower, why they did so, and how remain unknown. Widely considered the greatest prank in the university's history, the pumpkin prompted national media coverage, the creation of a live webcam, its own daily feature in one of the school papers, and at least two scientific inquiries into whether the object on top of the tower was, in fact, a pumpkin; morphological, chemical, and DNA analysis confirmed that it was. It also inspired a unique version of the Cornell alma mater. It was removed on March 13, 1998.

=== 21st century ===
In April 2005, a disco ball was attached to the top of the tower. A crane was hired to remove the offending orb, costing the university about $20,000.

On December 1, 2019, a large Santa Claus hat was discovered on top of the tower.

On April 11, 2022, the tower resumed allowing public attendance of its chimes concerts after a near two-year hiatus caused by the COVID-19 pandemic.

Beginning in fall of 2023, McGraw Tower underwent a major renovation, which saw scaffolding placed up the entire height of the tower. On October 20, 2023, a pumpkin was once again placed atop the spire of McGraw Tower, 26 years after the initial prank.
