= Wenona, Michigan =

- Former village
- Location within the state of Michigan
- Coordinates: 43°35′52″N 83°53′53″W
- Country: United States
- State: Michigan
- County: Bay
- Founded: 1864
- Incorporated: 1867
- Disestablished: 1877
- Elevation: 548 ft (167 m)
- Time zone: UTC-5 (Eastern (EST))
  - Summer (DST): UTC-4 (EDT)
- GNIS feature ID: 2547458

Wenona was a historical settlement in the U.S. state of Michigan, located in what is now Bay City at 43°35′52″N 83°53′53″W.

The village was founded in 1863 by Henry W. Sage (1814–1897), a merchant and philanthropist, who along with John McGraw also founded the Sage, McGraw & Company sawmill on the west bank of the Saginaw River. The sawmill, which was the largest in the state, was an early economic center of the community. Sage initially platted the settlement with the name "Lake City", but because there was another Lake City in Michigan, it was renamed Wenona after the mother of Hiawatha in the poem by Henry Wadsworth Longfellow. George H. Bates became the first postmaster on February 14, 1865. Wenona incorporated as a village in 1867, and, in 1877 the Michigan Legislature consolidated Wenona with two other nearby villages, Banks and Salzburgh to form the city of West Bay City. In 1905, West Bay City merged with Bay City.

The fortunes created from the sawmill operation in Wenona and the lumber industry it supported formed the basis of important early gifts to Cornell University.
