= Cornell Chimes =

Chime on the campus of Cornell University

Coordinates: 42°26′51″N 76°29′06″W

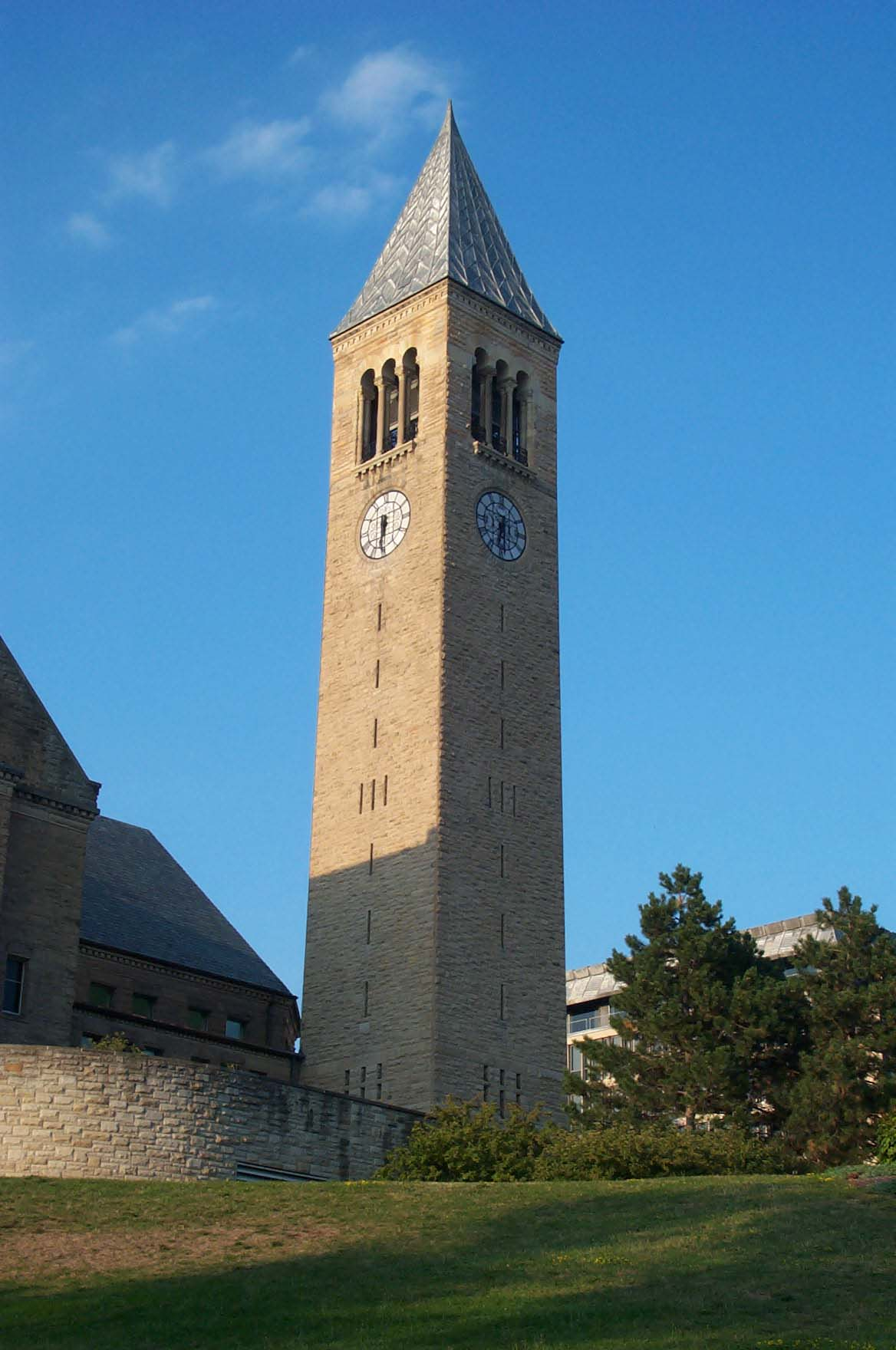
McGraw Tower

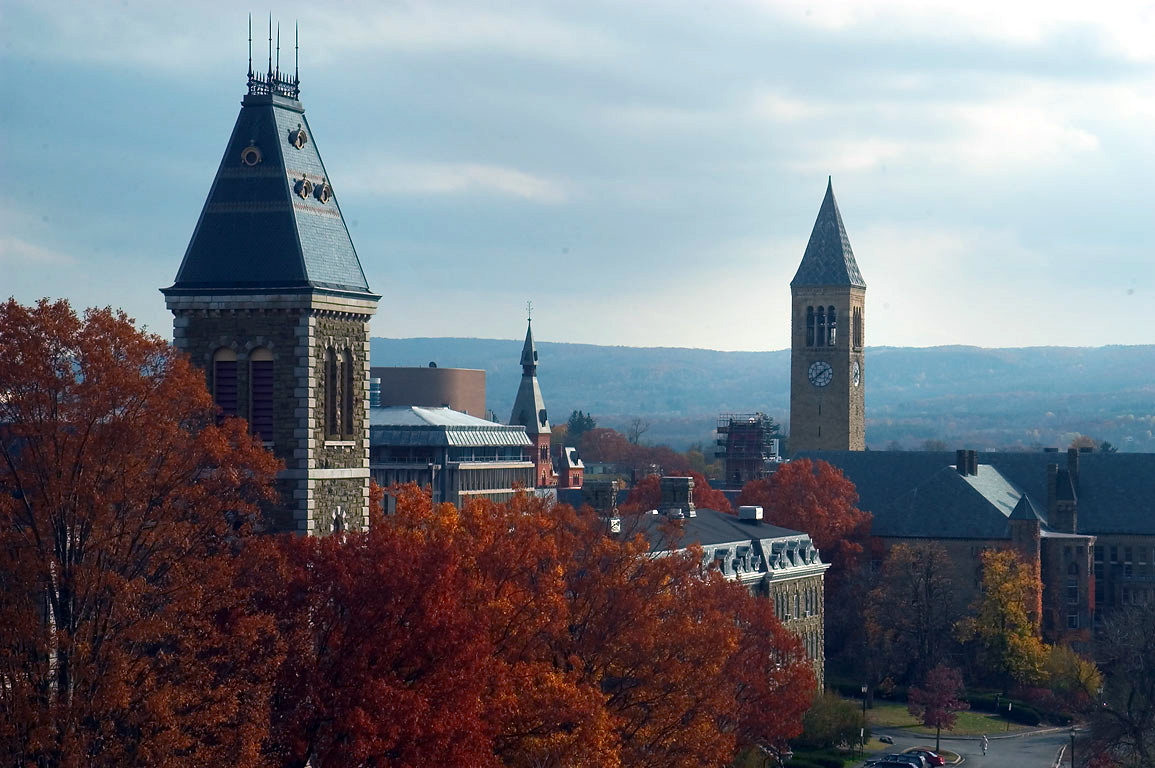
John McGraw Hall, foreground with McGraw Tower in the background.

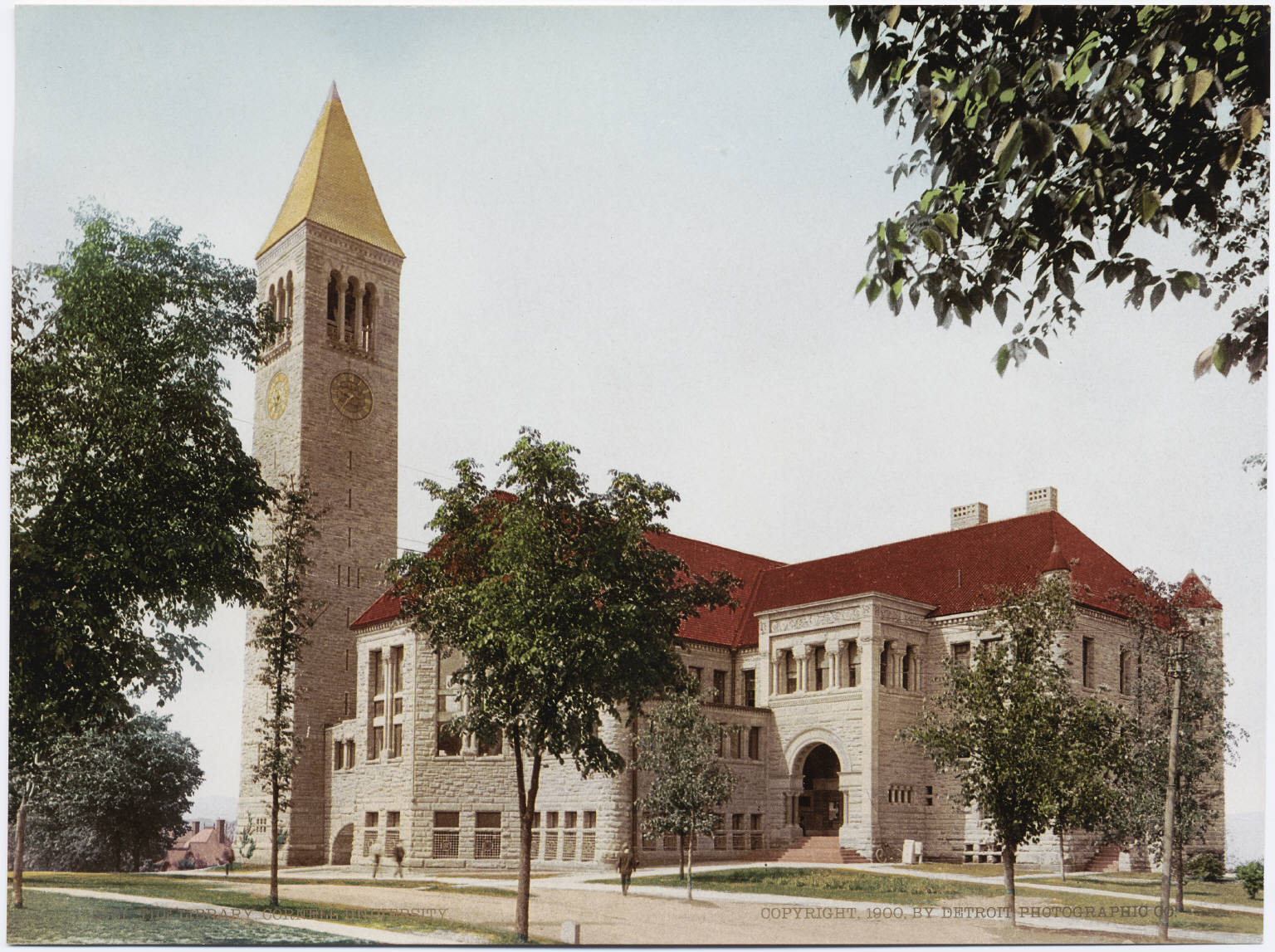
A late 19th or early 20th century view of the clocktower

The Cornell Chimes is a 21-bell chime in McGraw Tower on the central campus of Cornell University, in Ithaca, New York, United States.

The chime originally had nine bells, donated by Jennie McGraw. They first rang at the University's opening ceremonies on October 7, 1868, and have since marked the hours and been used for chiming concerts.

The tower, long called "the Library Tower", was renamed in 1961. Whether the new name was intended to honor Jennie McGraw or her father, trustee John McGraw, was not specified at the time.

== The Cornell Chimes ==
The bells are played by a group of "chimesmasters." About ten chimesmasters play three concerts daily during the school year and a reduced schedule during the summer and semester breaks, making it one of the largest and most frequently played chimes in the world. The chimes are sometimes mistakenly called a "carillon" which is incorrect as a true carillon has at least 23 bells, and a different playing console.

Many styles of music are played on the bells, including classical and modern pieces by a range of composers, including Beethoven, The Beatles, Franz Schubert, and Scott Joplin. Commonly played pieces include Edward Elgar's Pomp and Circumstance Marches and the theme from The Muppet Show, as well as a multitude of original compositions. The chimes' music library contains over two-thousand specially arranged pieces and original compositions—both solos and duets.

Every morning concert, since 1869, has begun with the "Cornell Changes" (affectionately known as the "Jennie McGraw Rag"). The chimesmasters' goal is to play its 549 notes as quickly as possible. The Cornell "Alma Mater" is played at the midday concert, and the "Cornell Evening Song" at the end of the evening concert.

Each spring semester potential chimesmasters, "compets", undergo a rigorous ten-week competition to become a chimesmaster. The only requirement to compete is an ability to read music and the energy to climb the 161 steps to operate the playing clavier (there is no mechanical assistance). The first stage of competition requires that compets learn the three traditional Cornell pieces (the "Jenny McGraw Rag," the "Alma Mater," and the "Cornell Evening Song"). Compets play a practice instrument, where the levers strike tuned bars with hammers (like a xylophone), allowing them to learn the instrument without the whole campus listening. To advance to the next round of competition, compets must demonstrate their mastery of the three songs, in addition to sight reading a piece. This audition is played on the main chimes console, but compets only press the dampers halfway, and therefore the chimes remain silent. Those who pass the silent audition move on to coached concerts, and then, finally, judged concerts, where compets take on the full responsibilities of a chimesmaster.

The Cornell Chimes welcome visitors to all concerts.

== McGraw Tower ==
In 1873, the chimes were moved from a ground-level playing stand to McGraw Hall. In 1891, they were moved to their permanent home atop McGraw Tower, designed by Cornell alumnus William Henry Miller. The 173-foot (53 m) tower is Cornell's most prominent landmark and is adjacent to Uris Library. The tower is also home to an office, museum, practice room, and a restored 1875 Seth Thomas clock with a 14-foot pendulum. Visitors can still see the clockworks and pendulum, but the clock was linked to the Global Positioning System in 1999.

== See also ==
- Altgeld Chimes
- Far Above Cayuga's Waters
