= John McGraw (merchant) =

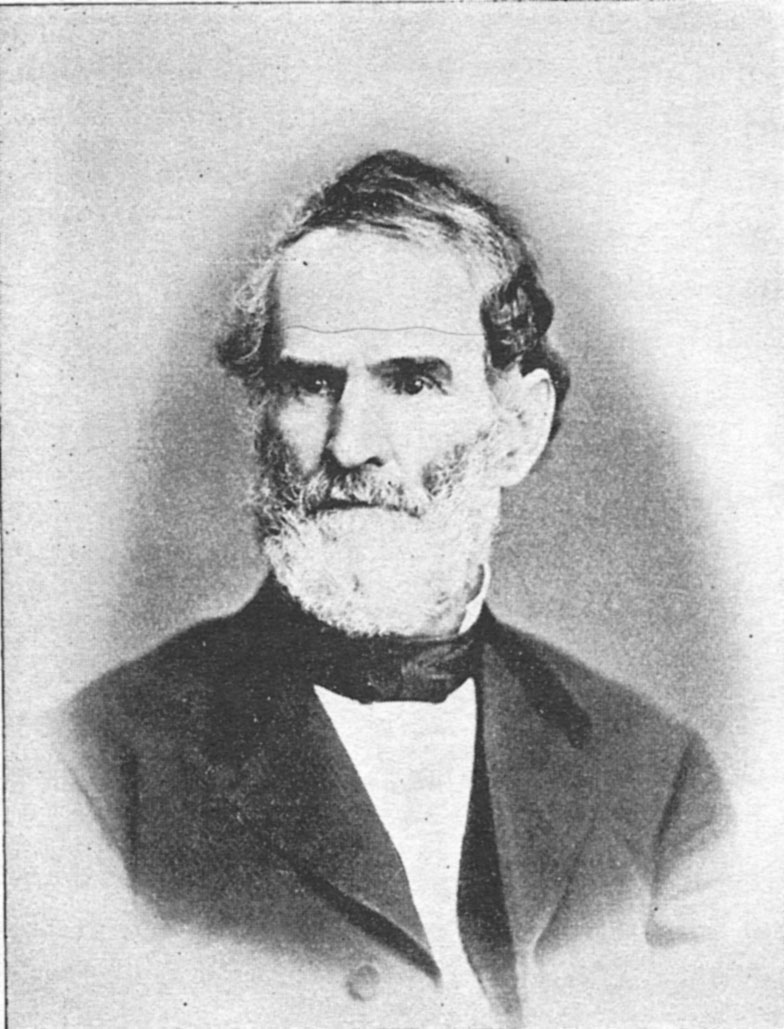
- Born: May 22, 1815; Dryden, New York, US
- Died: May 4, 1877 (aged 61); Ithaca, New York, US
- Monuments: McGraw Tower
- Occupations: Merchant; philanthropist
- Spouses: Rhoda Charlotte Southworth (died 1847); Nancy Amelia Southworth (m. 1849; died 1856); Jane P. Bates Turner (m. 1861)
- Children: Jennie

John McGraw (May 22, 1815 - May 4, 1877) was a wealthy New York State lumber merchant, philanthropist, early benefactor and trustee of Cornell University.

== Early years ==
John McGraw was born in Dryden, New York, on May 22, 1815, to Joseph McGraw and Jane Nelson McGraw, both natives of Northern Ireland.

== Career ==
He and his business partner, Henry W. Sage, together made a great deal of money selling lumber from forests in New York, Wisconsin and Michigan, and operating a large lumber mill in Wenona, Michigan, now part of Bay City, Michigan. They also co-founded the town of Wenona.

== Family ==
He married Rhoda Charlotte Southworth in Dryden. She was born September 19, 1819, also in Dryden, the daughter of John Southworth of Salisbury, New York, and Nancy Ellis Southworth of Dryden. She gave birth to his only daughter, Jennie McGraw. After Rhoda's death in 1847, he married her sister, Nancy Amelia Southworth in 1849. Nancy died on 29 February 1856 at the age of 30. John later married Jane P. Bates Turner in Ithaca, Tompkins, New York, in 1861. She died in Ithaca in 1904 at the age of 84.

== Death ==
John died May 4, 1877, in Ithaca, New York. His daughter, Jennie inherited his large fortune. She died Sep. 30, 1881. Both John and his daughter, Jennie are buried in the crypt at Sage Chapel, Cornell University in Ithaca, New York.

== Jennie's gift to Cornell ==
Upon Jennie's death, some of this fortune was bequeathed to Cornell. A dispute over this gift led to the Great Will Case, ultimately decided by the United States Supreme Court against Cornell in Cornell Univ. v. Fiske et al. (1890). His former business partner, Henry Sage, made a large donation to Cornell in the name of Jennie to replace the lost funds.

== Legacy ==
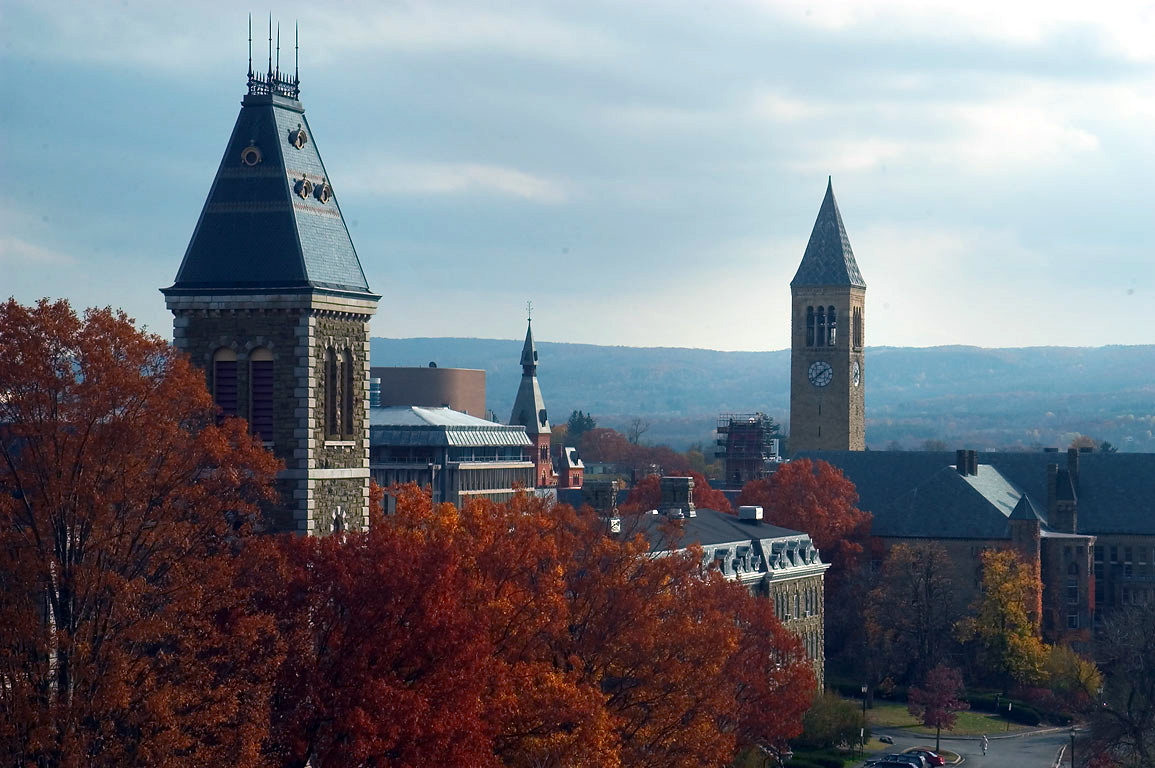
McGraw Hall and McGraw Tower

The McGraw name graces the principal clock tower of Cornell. Additionally, McGraw Hall is one of the buildings on the main arts quad of Cornell University. Among other uses, it was the first home of Cornell's business school, now known as the Samuel Curtis Johnson Graduate School of Management and located in Sage Hall.

== Sources ==
- Dryden History Website
- Bay City, Michigan history page
- Supreme Court decision in Cornell Univ. v. Fiske et al. (1890)
