= Willard Fiske =

American librarian, book collector, and chess player

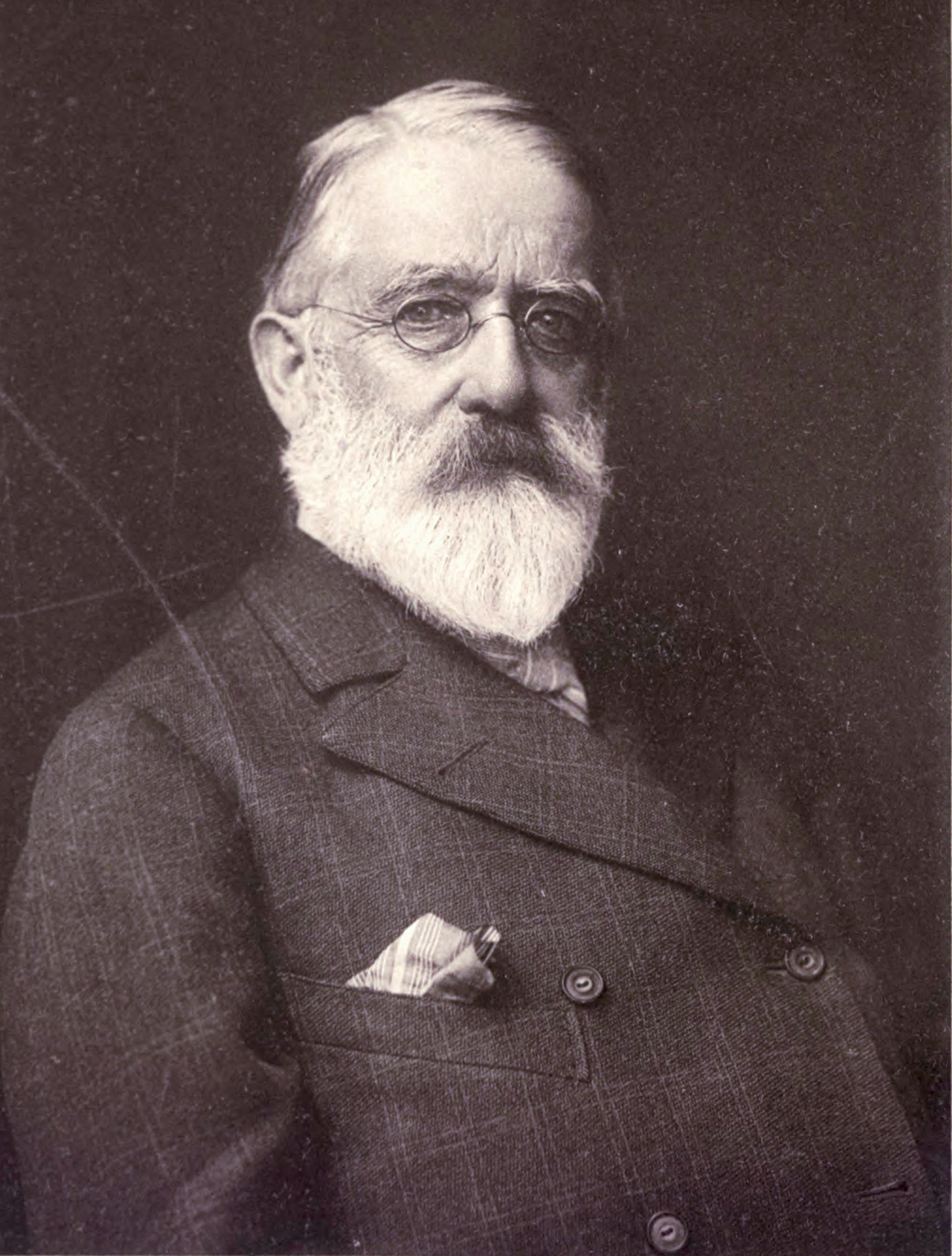
Willard Fiske

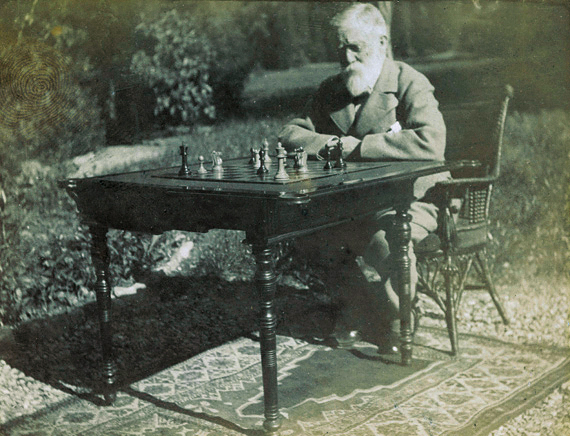
Fiske playing chess, c. 1900

Daniel Willard Fiske (November 11, 1831 – September 17, 1904) was an American librarian and scholar, born on November 11, 1831, at Ellisburg, New York. He was awarded American Library Association Honorary Membership in 1895.

== Biography ==
Fiske studied at Cazenovia Seminary and started his collegiate studies at Hamilton College in 1847. He joined the Psi Upsilon but was suspended for a student prank at the end of his sophomore year. He was educated at Copenhagen and at Uppsala University. Upon his return to the United States, he acted as a General Secretary to the American Geographical Society and edited the Syracuse Daily Journal.

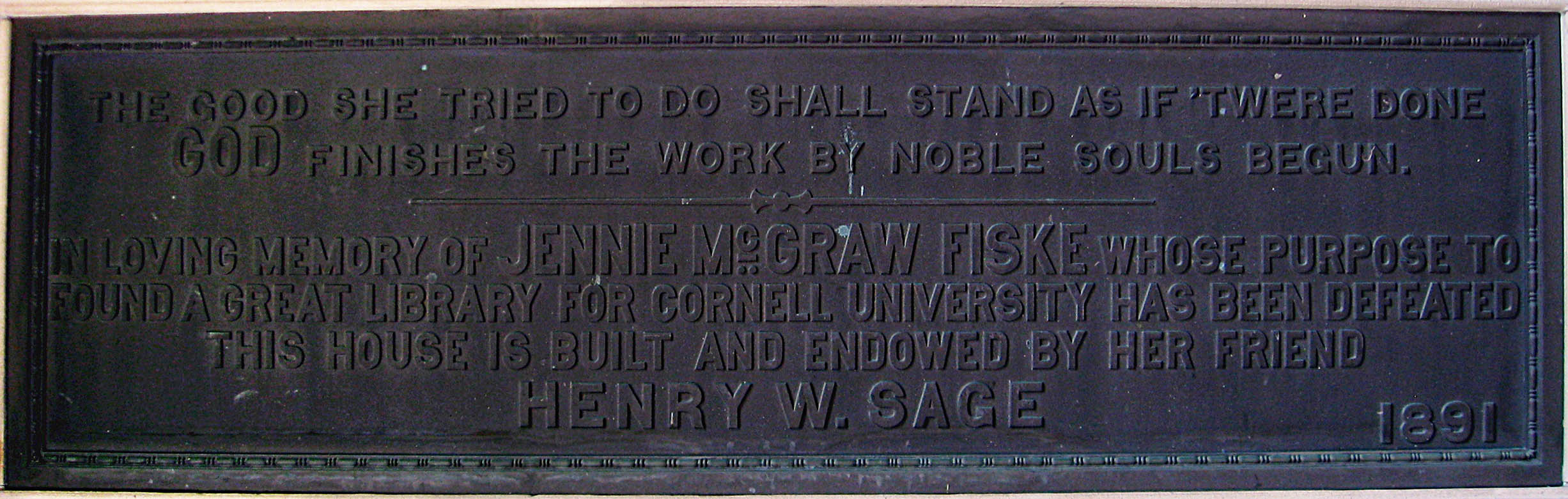
Dedication plaque on Uris Library referencing Henry W. Sage's gift in lieu of Jennie McGraw's estate bequest ("whose purpose to found a great library for Cornell University has been defeated") after the resolution of the Great Will Case

Upon the opening of Cornell University in Ithaca, New York, Fiske was named university librarian and professor in 1868. He made a reputation as an authority on the Northern European languages, and Icelandic language and culture in particular.

With loans from Andrew Dickson White, Fiske at age 48 took a leave of absence and sailed to Europe. In the summer of 1879, he visited Iceland for three months, traveling on the island with two other Americans and endearing himself to the residents by organizing donations of books from America. He traveled to Rome in April 1880 to join Jennie McGraw, then age 49. In July 1880, he married Jennie, at the American Legation in Berlin. McGraw was the daughter of timber magnate John McGraw, and upon John McGraw's death in 1877 inherited $2.2 million ($66.5 million today). Their marriage was short, and by September 1881 she had died from tuberculosis. Controversy over her will's bequest to Cornell left Fiske involved in the Great Will Case. Following its resolution in May 1890, he spent much of his remaining years in Italy, and collected manuscripts.

His interests included chess; he helped organize the first American Chess Congress in 1857 and wrote the tournament book in 1859, and edited The Chess Monthly from 1857 to 1861 with Paul Morphy. His scholarly volume, Chess In Iceland and in Icelandic Literature (Florence, 1905), was used as source material by H. J. R. Murray for A History of Chess. Another manuscript, Chess Tales and Chess Miscellanies (New York, 1912), also published posthumously, is an anthology covering chess life of the period including articles about Morphy, problems by Sam Loyd, and the history of chess including some fables.

Fiske donated thousands of volumes to Cornell including a 1536 edition of the Divine Comedy that he purchased in April 1892 and directed to be sent directly to Cornell. The Fiske Dante Collection grew out of this acquisition and as of 2005 numbered approximately 10,000 volumes.

On September 17, 1904, Fiske died at Frankfurt am Main, Germany. He is buried next to his wife Jennie McGraw Fiske in the elaborate crypt of Sage Chapel at Cornell University. Upon his death, Fiske left a bequest of 32,000 volumes, the Fiske Icelandic Collection, to Cornell along with funds that Fiske had received from Jennie's estate.
