= The Chess Monthly (American magazine) =

19th-century chess magazine

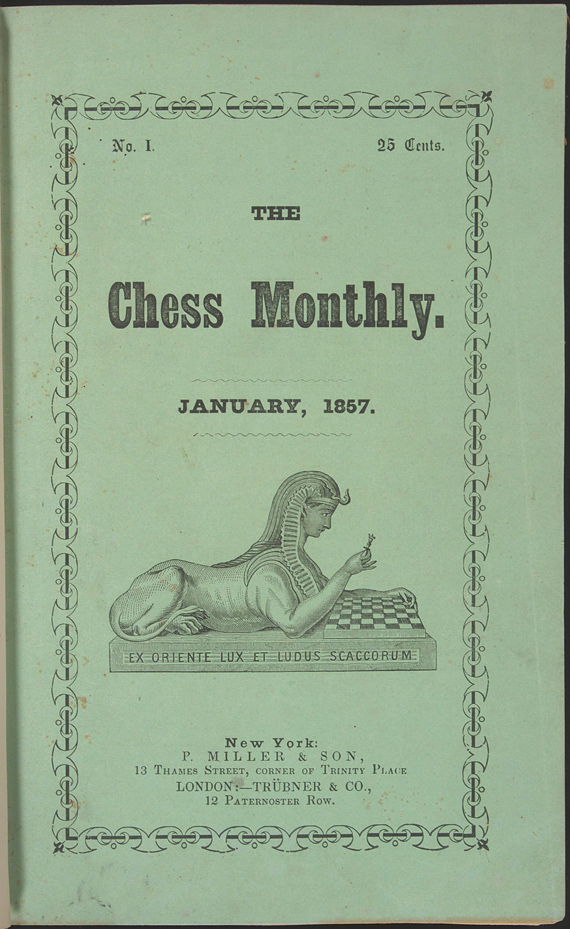
- Discipline: Chess
- Language: English
- Edited by: Daniel Willard Fiske; Paul Morphy

Publication details
- History: January 1857 – May 1861
- Publisher: P. Miller and Son (U.S.)
- Frequency: monthly

Standard abbreviations
- ISO 4: Chess Mon.

Indexing
- OCLC no.: 1554064

The Chess Monthly was a short-lived monthly chess magazine produced from January 1857 and May 1861 in the United States. Edited by professional diplomat and linguistics professor Daniel Willard Fiske, it was co-edited for a time by Paul Morphy. The magazine was based in New York City.

Eugene B. Cook (1830–1915) and Sam Loyd edited the chess problems section. Running for only five volumes, the magazine is perhaps best remembered today for a two-part article ("The last of a veteran chess player") written by Silas Mitchell about the Turk, the chess-playing machine that had perished in a fire in Philadelphia.
