= History of Cornell University =

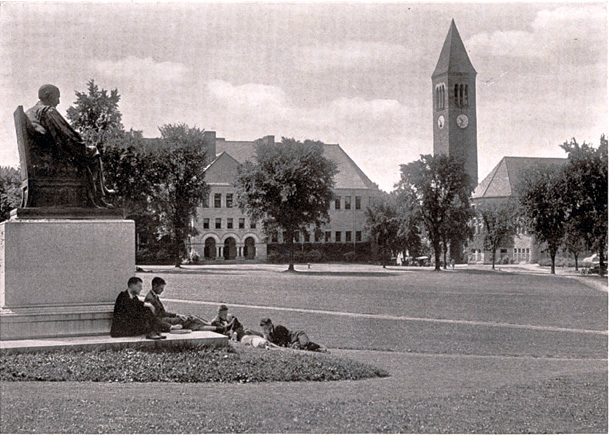
Statue of A.D. White on the Arts Quadrangle with Boardman Hall in the background.

The history of Cornell University begins when its two founders, Andrew Dickson White of Syracuse and Ezra Cornell of Ithaca, met in the New York State Senate in January 1864. Together, they established Cornell University in Ithaca, New York, in 1865. The university was initially funded by Ezra Cornell's $400,000 endowment and by New York's 989,920-acre (4,006.1 km^{2}) allotment of the Morrill Land Grant Act of 1862.

However, even before Ezra Cornell and Andrew White met in the New York Senate, each had separate plans and dreams that would draw them toward their collaboration in founding Cornell. White believed in the need for a great university for the nation that would take a radical new approach to education; and Cornell, who had great respect for education and philanthropy, desired to use his money "to do the greatest good." Abraham Lincoln's signing of Vermont Senator Justin Morrill's Land Grant Act into law was also critical to the formation of many universities, including Cornell, in the post–Civil War era.

== Precursors ==
A generation before the founding of Cornell University, abolitionist and philanthropist Gerrit Smith of Peterboro in Upstate New York proposed the creation of a major university for the state. In 1835, he hosted the relocated meeting of the New York State Anti-Slavery Society at his home after it was forced out of Utica (Oneida County) by the mayor. Smith was active in numerous reform movements and widely known for his philanthropy. In addition to emergency relief and anti-slavery efforts, he provided significant financial support to progressive educational institutions including Oberlin College, the Oneida Institute, Berea College, and Fisk University. He also considered founding a university in New York for the "highest education of men and women, white and black," but the plan was never realized.

One educational initiative closely associated with Smith was the founding of Central College in 1849 in McGraw, approximately 40 miles (64 km) west of Peterboro. Conceived as a successor to the failed Oneida Institute, Central was also part of the manual labor college movement, which promoted combining academic study with physical labor as both spiritually and economically beneficial. Central College (1849–1860) was one of the first American institutions to admit women, Black students, and Native Americans on an equal basis from its founding. It also hired Black faculty members who taught integrated classes. Despite its progressive mission, Central struggled financially and faced widespread racial prejudice; according to contemporary accounts, some parents refused to send their children to what was referred to as "a nigger college." When the institution went bankrupt, Smith assumed its debts and remaining assets.

== Founders ==
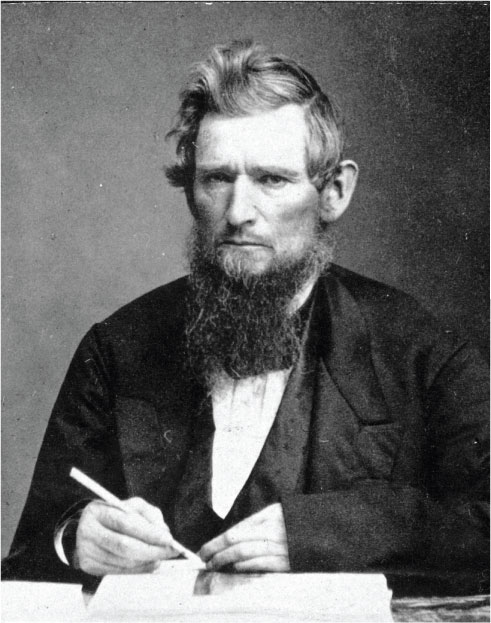
Ezra Cornell, namesake of Cornell University.

As newly elected members of the New York State Senate, Ezra Cornell and Andrew Dickson White chaired committees with jurisdiction over legislation related to the federal land-grant program. Cornell led the Committee on Agriculture, while White chaired the Committee on Literature, which addressed educational policy. The land-grant program required recipient institutions to provide instruction in agriculture and the mechanic arts, "without excluding other scientific and classical studies, and including military tactics".

Although they came from different backgrounds, Cornell and White shared a commitment to education and public service. Cornell, a self-taught businessman, accumulated significant wealth through his involvement in the development of telegraph infrastructure, particularly through his investment in the Western Union Telegraph Company. Having lived much of his life in poverty, Cornell later expressed a desire to use his fortune to benefit future generations. He wrote, "My greatest care now is how to spend this large income to do the greatest good to those who are properly dependent on me, to the poor and to posterity." His philanthropic interests centered on expanding access to practical education in fields such as agriculture, applied science, engineering, and veterinary medicine.

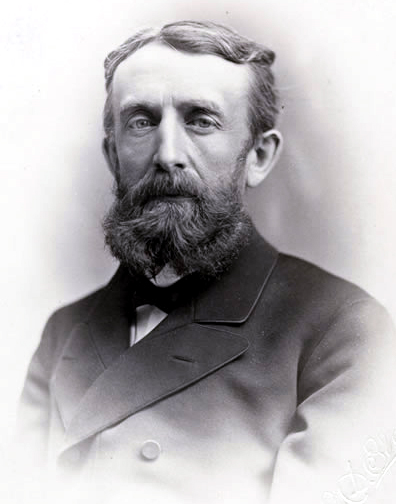
Andrew Dickson White in 1885.

White began his academic career at Geneva Academy (later Hobart and William Smith Colleges) before transferring to Yale University. While at Geneva, he became interested in European models of higher education, particularly the institutions at Oxford and Cambridge. At Yale, White found the curriculum to be more structured than he preferred, later criticizing the emphasis on rote memorization. During the late 1850s, White served as a professor of history at the University of Michigan, where he was influenced by the university's secular administration and comparatively liberal curriculum. These experiences shaped White’s vision of a nonsectarian, modern university that could serve both the state and the nation.

== Conception ==
Andrew Dickson White was impressed by one of Ezra Cornell’s early actions as a state senator: the introduction of a bill to establish a public library in Ithaca, to which Cornell pledged $100,000. White noted both the scale of the donation and what he described as Cornell’s inclusive approach to governance. In his memoir, White wrote:

The most striking sign of this was his mode of forming a board of trustees; for, instead of the usual effort to tie up the organization forever in some sect, party or clique, he had named the best men of his town—his political opponents as well as his friends; and had added to them the pastors of all the principal churches, Catholic and Protestant.

Despite their shared values, Cornell and White initially supported different approaches to distributing New York’s federal land-grant funds under the Morrill Act. In 1863, the New York State Legislature designated the proceeds of the land grant to the People's College in Havana (now Montour Falls), provided it met certain conditions within a specified timeframe. Given the five-year deadline imposed by the Morrill Act for each state to designate a land-grant institution, there was growing concern that the People's College would not fulfill the requirements.

At the time, Cornell served on the board of the New York State Agricultural College in Ovid and supported a proposal to allocate half of the grant to that institution. White opposed the measure, arguing that the state’s educational resources were already too fragmented. He advocated instead for using the entire grant to establish a single, comprehensive university.

On September 25, 1864, during a meeting in Rochester, Cornell offered to donate $300,000—later increased to $500,000—to endow a university in Ithaca, contingent upon securing the land-grant funds and relocating the college there. Although White continued to oppose dividing the grant, he expressed willingness to support a unified proposal that incorporated Cornell’s offer. This alignment of interests marked the beginning of their formal collaboration, which ultimately led to the founding of Cornell University.

== Establishment ==
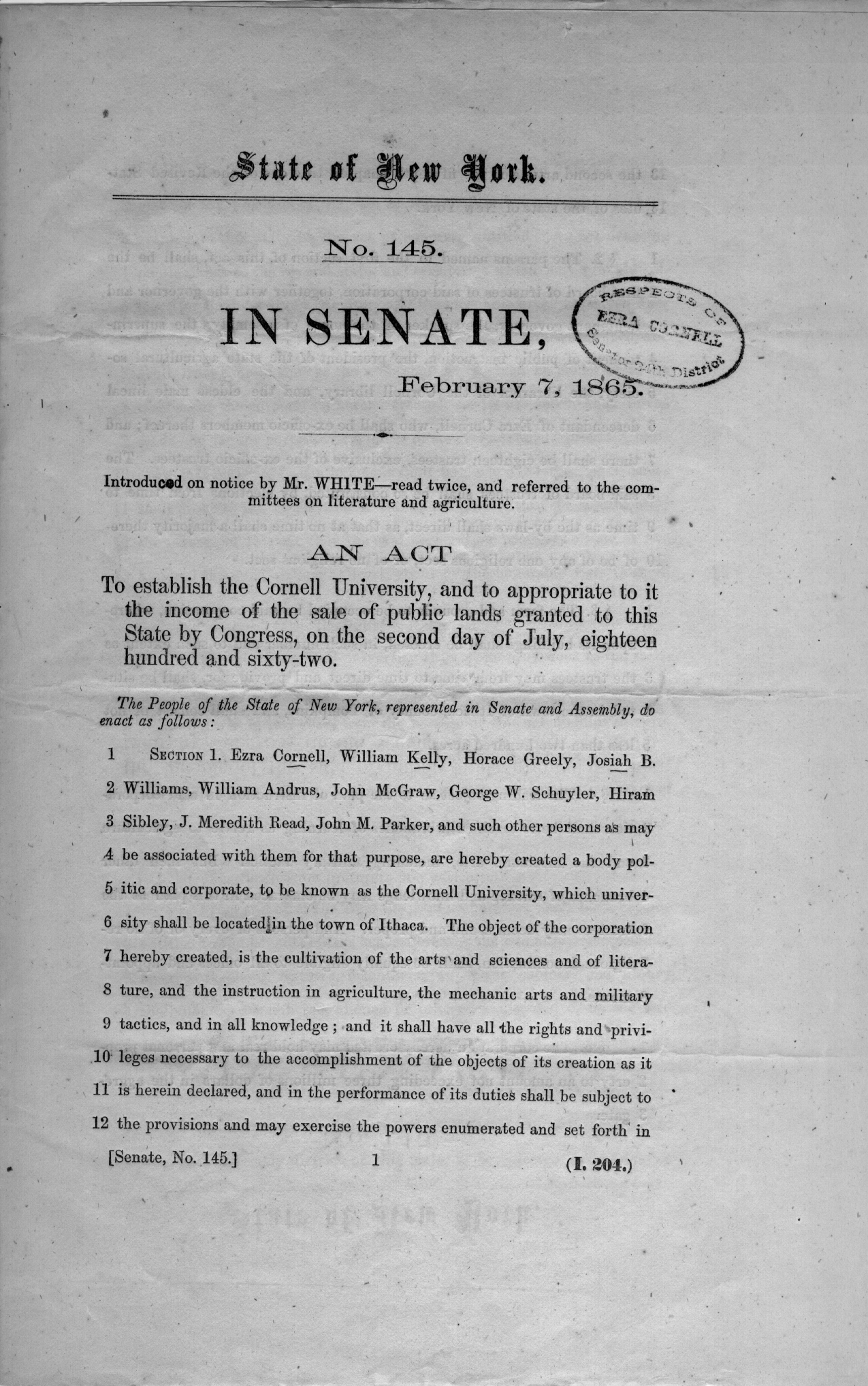
1865 Senate bill to establish Cornell University.

On February 7, 1865, State Senator Andrew Dickson White introduced legislation to establish Cornell University. The proposed bill allocated the full proceeds from the federal Morrill Act land grant to the new institution. Although White and Ezra Cornell had reached an agreement, the proposal encountered significant opposition. Competing claims came from the People's College in Havana (now Montour Falls), the Agricultural College at Ovid, and other institutions across the state. Additional objections came from religious groups, who criticized the proposed nonsectarian composition of the university’s board of trustees, and from segments of the secular press, which expressed skepticism about Cornell’s financial role in the arrangement.

To address concerns from legislators representing Ovid, White helped facilitate the establishment of the Willard State Asylum for the Insane on the site previously designated for the Agricultural College. The bill also capped the university's property and endowment holdings at $3 million.

The legislation was amended multiple times to secure broader support. One revision granted the People's College an additional three months to meet the conditions of its earlier 1863 charter. Another amendment resulted from negotiations with a Methodist faction supporting Genesee College, which agreed to back the bill in exchange for a $25,000 donation from Ezra Cornell. Cornell insisted that this arrangement be formally included in the legislation.

The bill was signed into law by Governor Reuben E. Fenton on April 27, 1865. On July 27, the People's College officially forfeited its claim to the land grant, clearing the way for the establishment of Cornell University.

Between 1865 and the university’s opening in 1868, Cornell and White worked to lay its foundations. Cornell focused on construction and finance, overseeing the building of Morrill Hall and managing the investment of federal land scrip in western lands—an effort that eventually generated millions of dollars for the university. Meanwhile, White, who was elected the university’s first president on November 21, 1866, concentrated on academic and administrative planning. He traveled to France, Germany, and England to visit educational institutions, acquire books and equipment, and recruit faculty. Upon his return, White was inaugurated as president in 1868 and served in that role until his retirement in 1885.

== Early years ==
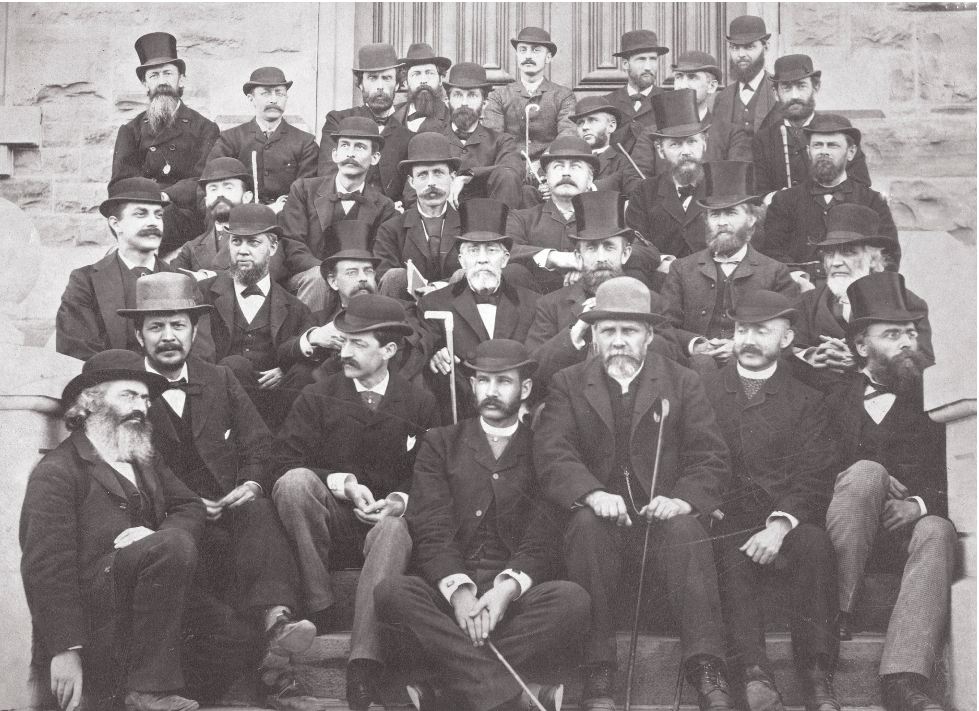
The Cornell faculty in 1882.

Cornell University officially opened on October 7, 1868, with inaugural ceremonies held in Ithaca. On the day prior, prospective students sat for entrance examinations. A total of 412 were admitted, making it the largest entering class at any American university at the time. During the opening ceremonies, Ezra Cornell addressed the assembled audience, expressing his hope "to combine practical with liberal education," and serve "the poor young men and the poor young women of our country." He also offered the guiding ideal that would later become the university’s motto: "I would found an institution where any person can find instruction in any study."

The university's early facilities reflected this practical and accessible vision. Two Ithaca institutions previously founded by Ezra Cornell played key roles in the university’s launch. The Cornell Free Library, opened in 1866, functioned as both a classroom and a library for the initial students. Cascadilla Hall, originally constructed as a water cure sanitarium in 1866, became the university’s first dormitory. Cornell was also among the first American universities to admit women. The first female student enrolled in 1870, despite the absence of a dedicated women’s residence. To address this, Henry W. Sage pledged $250,000 in 1872 to construct a women's dormitory. The resulting Sage College (now Sage Hall) opened in 1875, enabling broader coeducational participation.

Significant curricular reforms also distinguished Cornell in its early years. Under President Andrew Dickson White, the university adopted the elective system in 1868, granting students the ability to choose their own courses of study rather than follow a fixed curriculum. This model anticipated similar changes at other institutions, including Harvard University under President Charles William Eliot in 1872.

These developments—coeducation, practical facilities, and curricular innovation—contributed to Cornell’s influence on higher education in the United States. Historian Frederick Rudolph later wrote:

Andrew D. White, its first president, and Ezra Cornell, who gave it his name, turned out to be the developers of the first American university and therefore the agents of revolutionary curricular reform.

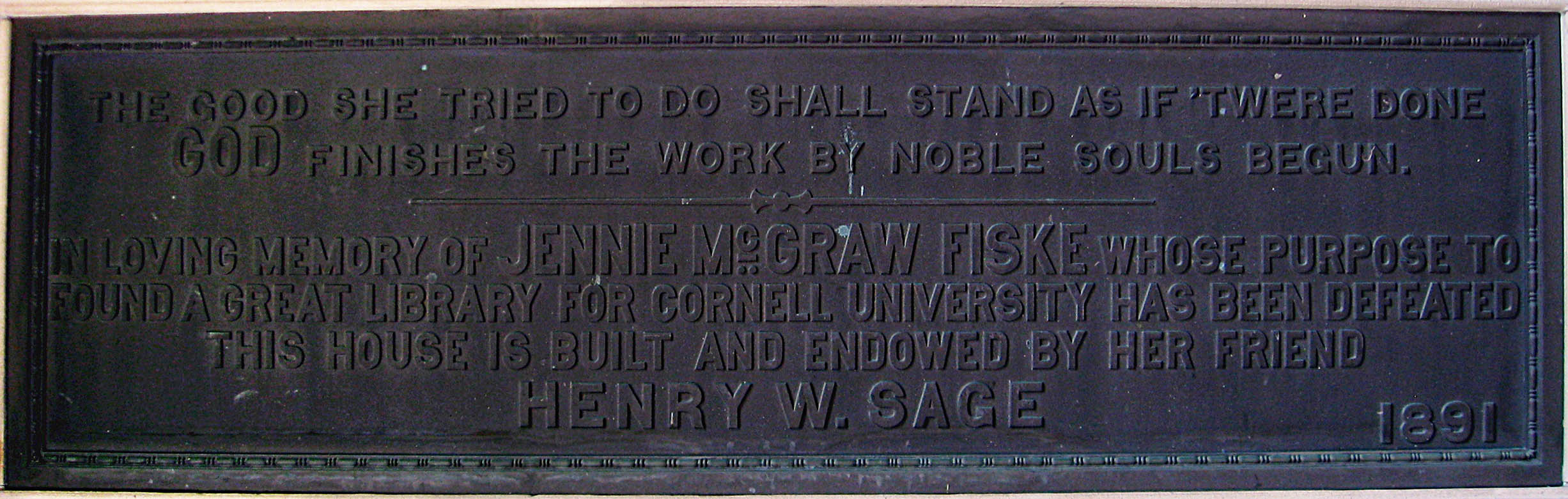
Dedication plaque on Uris Library referencing Sage's gift in lieu of Jennie McGraw's estate payment.

One of the university's major early philanthropic challenges came in connection with the construction of its main library. In her will, benefactor Jennie McGraw left over $1 million in bequests, including $200,000 for a university library. However, Cornell’s charter limited its property holdings to $3 million, and it could not legally accept the full estate. Upon learning of the restriction, McGraw’s husband, Willard Fiske, initiated a legal challenge known as The Great Will Case. In 1890, the United States Supreme Court upheld the lower court's ruling that Cornell could not receive the inheritance. In response, Henry W. Sage donated $500,000 to fund the construction of the library, which opened in 1892 and was later named Uris Library.

== Coeducation ==
=== Background ===
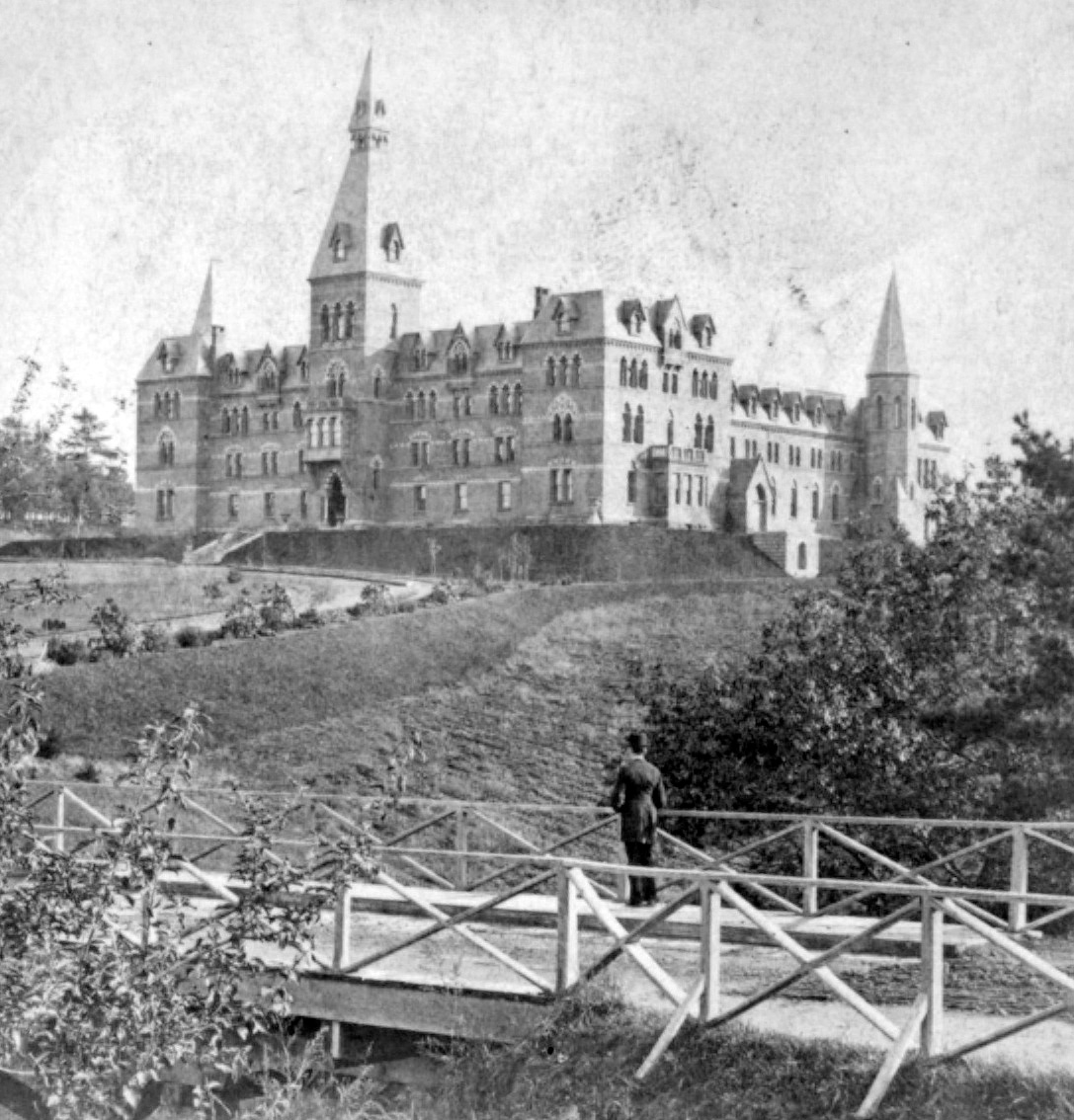
Sage College was the constructed as the women's dormitory in 1872.

In the mid 19th century, coeducation was still a new and controversial idea. Most colleges were exclusively male, and several women's colleges had been founded as a response. But prior to Cornell's charter in 1865, few colleges were devoted to coeducation. (It is worth noting that coeducation did not catch on broadly with elite northeastern schools, including other Ivy League schools, until the 1960s) Oberlin College and University of Michigan were two coeducational colleges which predated Cornell's founding, and provided models for Cornell.

The carnage of the American Civil War had introduced women into new areas of experience and leadership, and because of war casualties women outnumbered men in the United States. Central New York, and especially nearby Seneca Falls, was the center of the 19th-century women's rights movement. Cornell's founders Ezra Cornell and Andrew Dickson White favored coeducation and had deliberately included language in the school's charter specifying that it would offer instruction to "any person". Still, the school had no explicit policy about accepting women, and Cornell enrolled its first class in 1868 with 412 men and no women. In theory, the school would accept any person who could pass the admission requirements, but no facilities existed for women at its start, and the reality of admitting women was not immediately clear.

In September 1870, one Jennie Spencer, of Cortland, New York, passed a state scholarship examination thus becoming Cornell's first female student. Because of the lack of housing for women on campus, Spencer lived in downtown Ithaca, requiring her to walk up the hill for classes. This was an arduous task in Ithaca's harsh weather, considering the condition of the roads and the bulky Victorian dress of the time. Spencer reluctantly left Cornell without graduating, but her situation raised awareness of the need for housing and facilities for women on campus.

=== Sage College ===
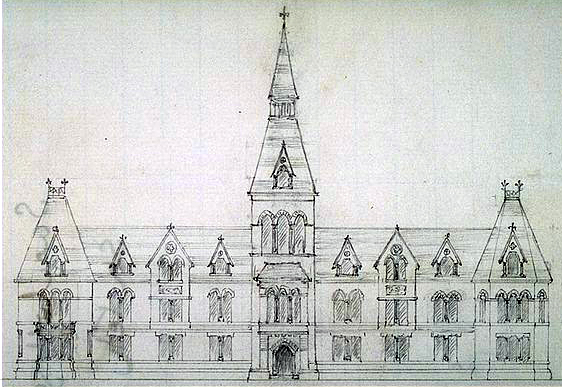
Architectural sketch of Sage College, 1871.

Henry W. Sage, local businessman and philanthropist, was an advocate for coeducation and promised to donate a sum of $250,000 on the condition that Cornell admit women on equal footing as men. This financial incentive, together with the support of both Cornell and White, led the trustees to formally vote to admit women starting April 1872. This decision caused Goldwin Smith, Cornell's most illustrious professor, to resign; Smith was convinced that admitting women would destroy Cornell's academic reputation.

In May 1873 the cornerstone was laid for Sage College for Women, a residence built specially to accommodate 120 women students.

In the fall of 1875, Cornell admitted forty-nine women. Twenty-nine lived in the newly opened Sage College; another twenty lived in boarding houses or with relatives. In 1895, 224 women were enrolled in the university, 104 of whom lived in Sage College.

=== Early growth ===
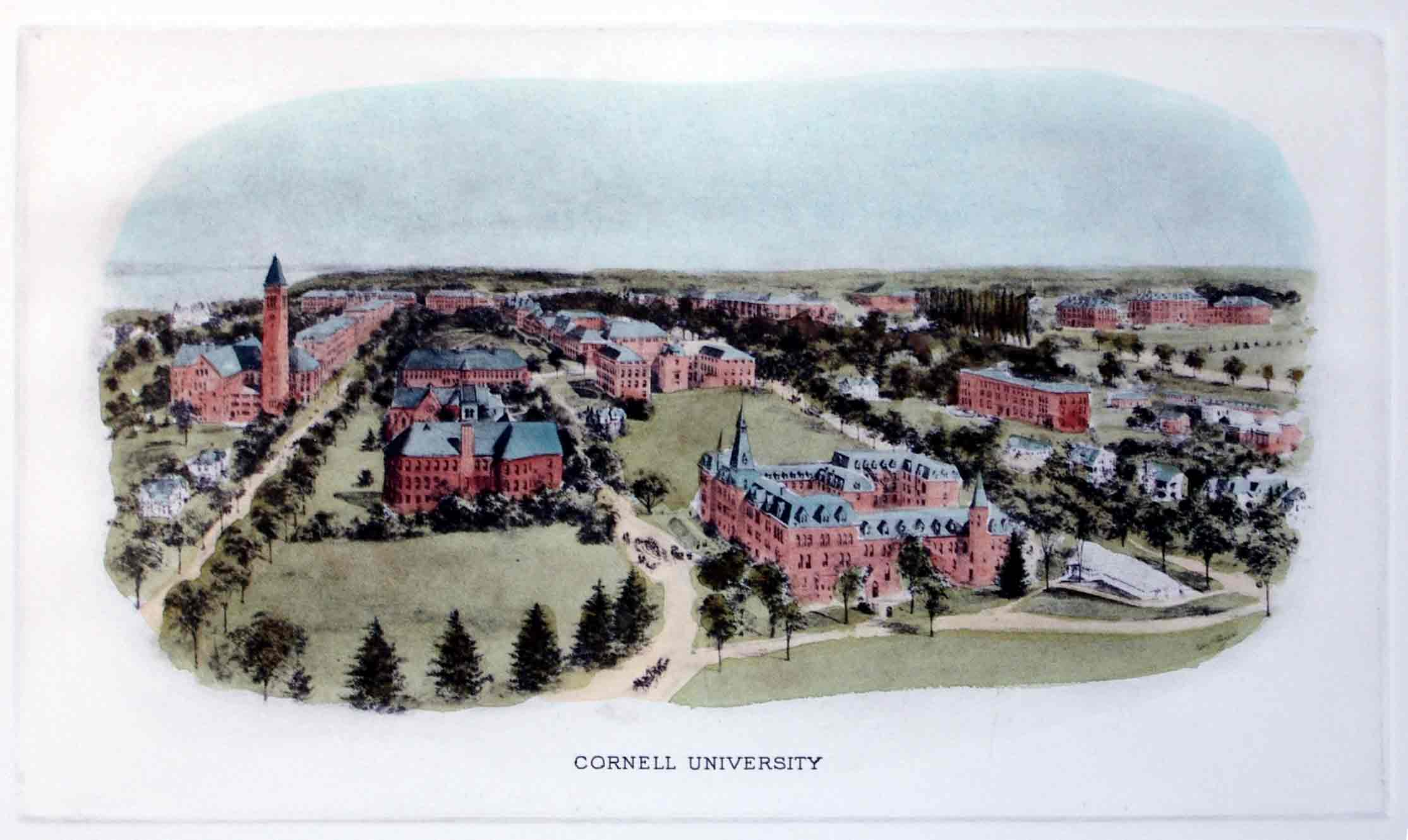
"Cornell University" by renowned landscape artist Richard Rummell (1848–1924), c. 1910. Sage Hall is depicted in the lower right.

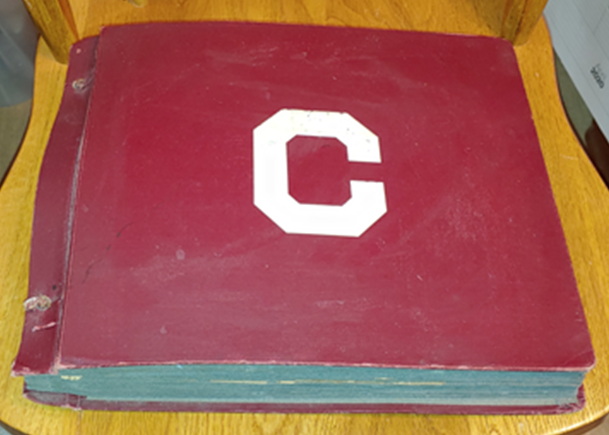
This Photo/Memory Album Offers a Fascinating Window to Student Life at Cornell University from 1914 to 1918.

As women entered the university, the university made accommodations for them. In 1884, Henry Sage endowed several of the first scholarships in the nation earmarked especially for women. In 1885, Cornell established a course in social work, a field seen as suited to women's academic interests. In 1900, a correspondence course for farmer's wives was begun by Martha Van Rensselaer, which evolved into the College of Home Economics, later the College of Human Ecology.

In 1895, a study was conducted to review the first twenty years of coeducation at Cornell. The study found that a total of 990 women had attended the university; of these, 325 received degrees, (Note: Note: The presence of so many non-degree women may be attributed to many women seeking specialized training to be teachers, a profession which did not yet require a college degree.) of which fifty-five were graduate degrees. Seventeen Cornell graduates went on to further advanced study, many of whom were the first women to gain admission to those institutions. Although a small percentage of the student body, women students per capita were found to outperform their male counterparts in terms of scholarships, fellowships, and other academic honors.

Some early notable women Cornell students included embryologist Susanna Phelps Gage, engineer Kate Gleason, Bryn Mawr president M. Carey Thomas, Wellesley president Julia Irvine, social reformer Florence Kelley '82, naturalist Anna Botsford Comstock '85, psychologist Margaret Floy Washburn Ph.D. '94, surgeon Emily Barringer '97, M.D. '01, lawyer/suffragist Gail Laughlin L.L.B. '98, editor and poet Jessie Redmon Fauset '05 and educator Martha Van Rensselaer '09.

In 1911, philanthropist Olivia Sage donated $300,000 for the construction of a second women's dormitory, Risley Residential College. The building was named for her late husband's mother.

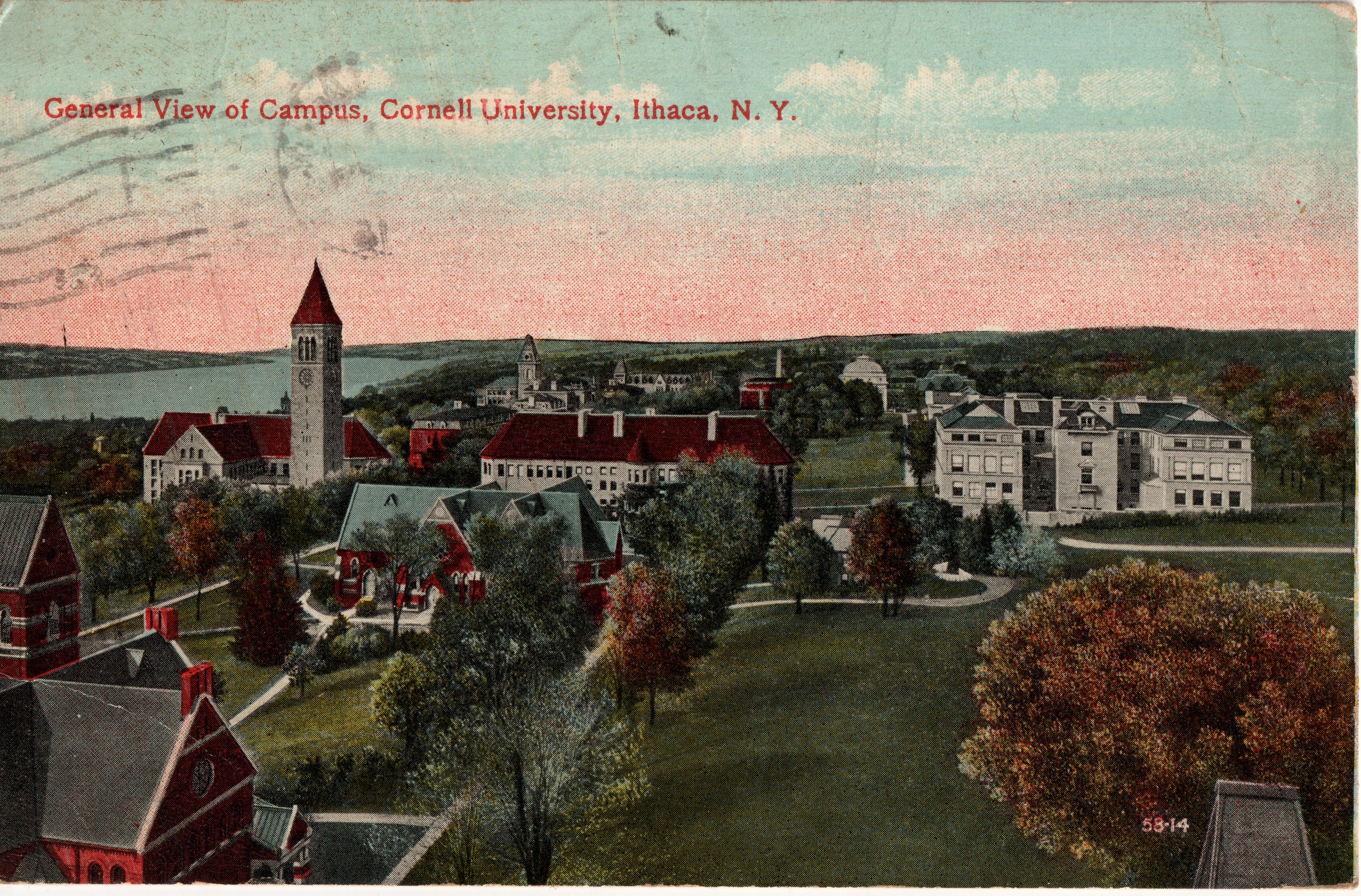
Cornell University in about 1915

=== Separate lives ===
The requirement that women (at least freshman women) must live in dormitories, which started in 1884, served to constrain female student admissions until 1972, when Cornell dropped its freshman dorm residency requirement. As a result, the academic admission standards for women in each college were typically higher than the corresponding standards for men. In general, women have been over-represented in certain schools and under-represented in others. For example, the NYS College of Home Economics and the Cornell School of Nursing historically drew a disproportionate number of women students, while the College of Engineering attracted fewer women.

Early in the history of the university, female students were separated from male students in many ways. For example, they had a separate entrance and lounges in Willard Straight Hall, a separate student government, and a separate page (edited by women) in The Cornell Daily Sun. The male students were required to take "drill" (a precursor to ROTC), but the women were exempt. One account of the history of coeducation at Cornell claims that in the very beginning, "[m]ale students were almost unanimously opposed to co-education, and vigorously protested the arrival of a group of 16 women, who promptly formed a women's club with a broom for their standard, and 'In hoc signo vinces' as their motto." In the 1870s and 1880s, female Cornell students on campus were generally ignored by male students. Women did not have a formal role in the annual commencement ceremony until 1935, when the senior class selected a woman to be Class Poet. In 1936, the Willard Straight Hall Board of Managers voted to allow women to eat in its cafeteria. Until the 1970s, male students resided in west campus dormitories while women were housed in the north campus.

As of 2019, the only remaining women's dormitory is Balch Hall, due to a restriction in the gift that funded it. Lyon Hall (which for most of its history was a men-only dormitory), also currently disallows male residents on its lower floors. All other dormitories were converted to co-educational housing in the late 1970s.

=== Veterinary College ===
The NYS College of Veterinary Medicine was an early pioneer in educating women, bestowing the first DVM degree on a woman in the United States, Florence Kimball, in 1910. However, until the early 1980s, the Vet College limited the number of women in each entering class to four or less, regardless of female applicants' qualifications.

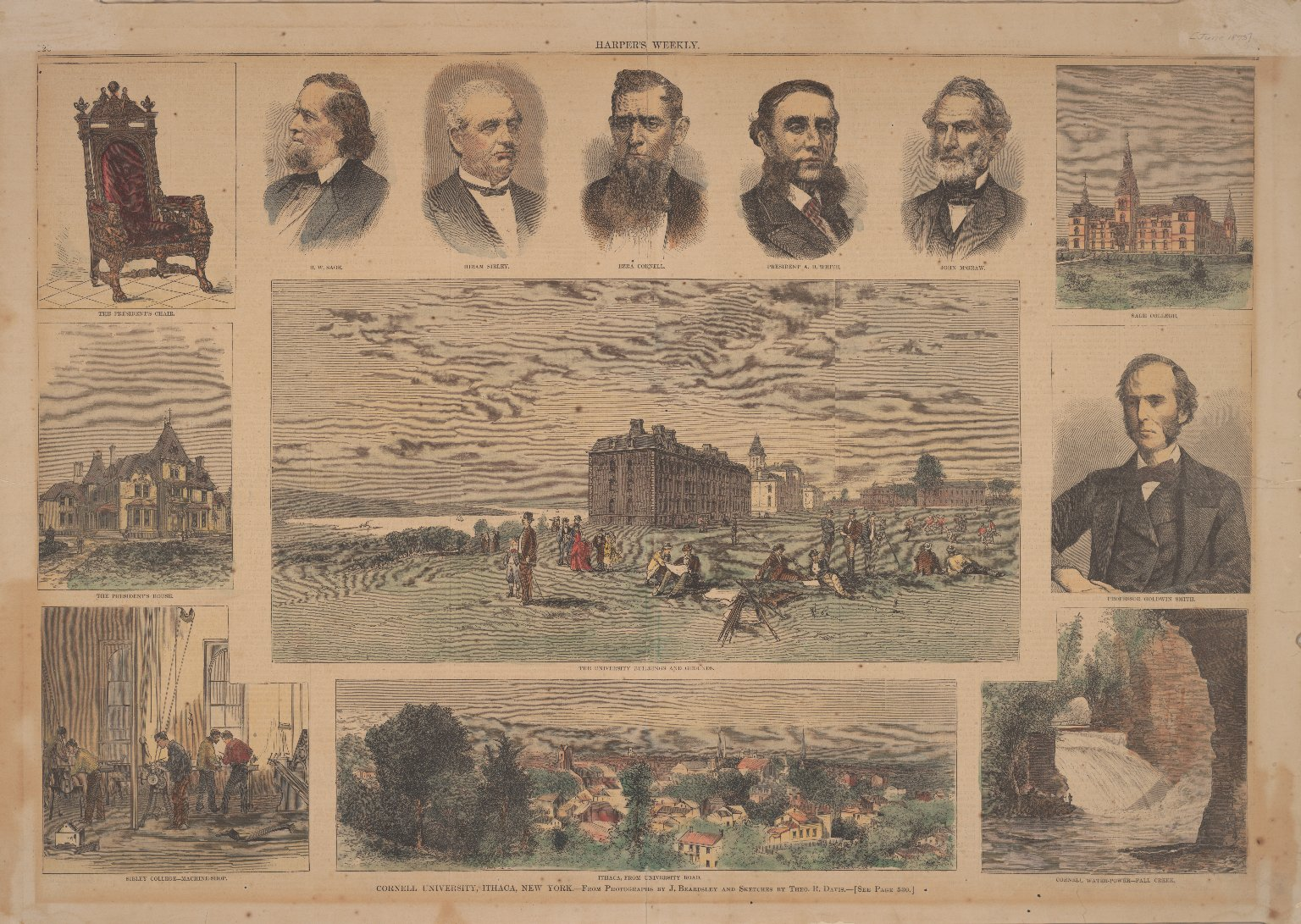
A pictorial spread about Cornell in Harper's Weekly in 1873.

=== Title IX ===
With the implementation of Title IX in the mid-1970s, Cornell significantly expanded its athletic offerings for women. The Department of Physical Education and Athletics moved from having all women's activities housed in Helen Newman Hall to having men's and women's programs in all facilities.

== Nonsectarianism and religion on campus ==
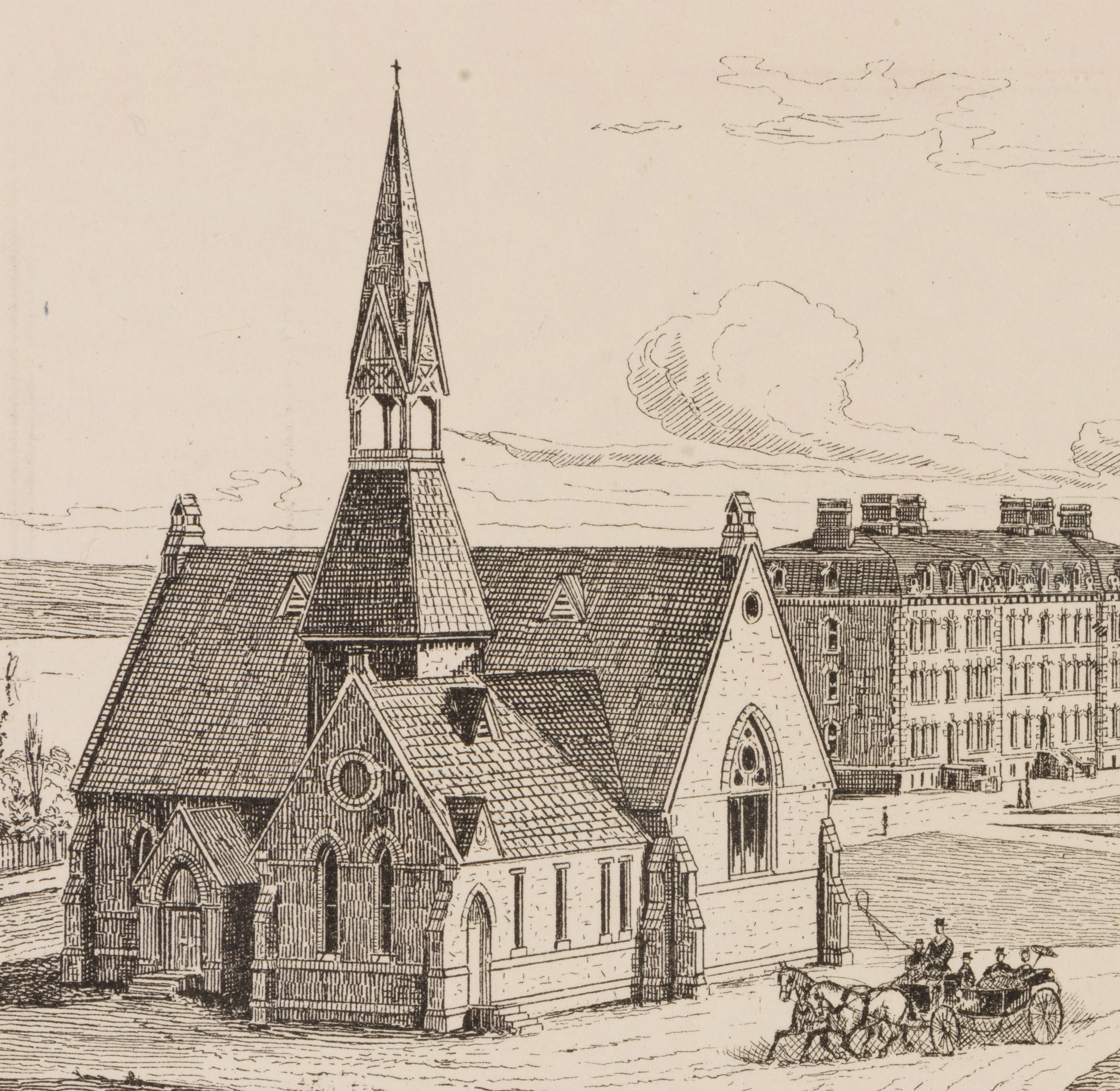
Sage Chapel opened in 1875.

Up until the time of Cornell's founding, most prominent American colleges had ties to religious denominations. Cornell was founded as a non-sectarian school, but had to compete with church-sponsored institutions for gaining New York's land-grant status. A.D. White noted in his inaugural address, "We will labor to make this a Christian institution, a sectarian institution may it never be." However, the university has made provision for voluntary religious observance on campus. Currently, the University Charter provides, "Persons of every religious denomination, or of no religious denomination, shall be equally eligible to all offices and appointments". Through the 20th century, the University Charter also required that a majority of trustees could not be of any single denomination. Sage Chapel, a non-denominational house of worship opened in 1875. Since 1929, the Cornell United Religious Works (CURW) has been an umbrella organization for the campus chaplains sponsored by different denominations and faiths. Perhaps the most newsworthy of the chaplains was Daniel Berrigan who, while Assistant Director of CURW, became a national leader in protesting the Vietnam War. In 1971, the social activism aspects of CURW were spun off into a separate Center for Religion, Ethics and Social Policy (CRESP). In 2006, CRESP was reorganized as Cornell's Center for Transformative Action.

In the late 1950s, the National Council of Young Israel (NCYI) leased a house across the street from the university and established a Jewish living center and kosher dining hall. The Cornell Young Israel chapter became the Center for Jewish Living, and a new Foundation for Kosher Observance at Cornell, Inc. was established so that the university's dining department would operate both a kosher kitchen at the center as well as serving kosher food on the North Campus.

Since the 1870s, Cornell's system of fraternities and sororities grew to play a large role in student life, with many chapters becoming a part of national organizations. As of 1952, 19 fraternities had national restrictions based on race, religion or national origin, and of the 32 fraternities without such national requirements, 19 did not have "mixed" memberships. In response, the undergraduate Interfraternity Council passed a resolution condemning discrimination. In the 1960s, the Trustees established a Commission to examine the membership restrictions of those national organizations. Cornell adopted a policy that required fraternities and sororities affiliated with nationals that discriminated based on religion or race to either amend their national charters or quit the national organizations. As a result, a number of national Greek organizations dropped racial or religious barriers to their membership.

In 1873, the cornerstone of Sage Hall was laid. This new hall was to house the Sage College for Women and thus to concretely establish Cornell University's coeducational status. Ezra Cornell wrote a letter for posterity—dated May 15, 1873—and sealed it into the cornerstone. No copies of the letter were made, and Cornell kept its contents a secret. However, he hinted at the theme of the letter during his speech at the dedication of Sage Hall, stating that "the letter deposited in the cornerstone addressed to the future man and woman, of which I have kept no copy, will relate to future generations the cause of the failure of this experiment, if it ever does fail, as I trust in God it never will."

Cornell historians largely assumed that the "experiment" to which Cornell referred was that of coeducation, given that Sage Hall was to be a women's dormitory and that coeducation was still a controversial issue at the time. However, when the letter was finally unearthed in 1997, its focus was revealed to be the university's nonsectarian status—a principle which had invited equal controversy in the 19th century, given that most universities of the time had specific religious affiliations. Cornell wrote:

On the occasion of laying the cornerstone of the Sage College for women of Cornell University, I desire to say that the principle [sic] danger, and I say almost the only danger I see in the future to be encountered by the friends of education, and by all lovers of true liberty is that which may arise from sectarian strife.

From these halls, sectarianism must be forever excluded, all students must be left free to worship God, as their concience [sic] shall dictate, and all persons of any creed or all creeds must find free and easy access, and a hearty and equal welcome, to the educational facilities possessed by the Cornell University.

Coeducation of the sexes and entire freedom from sectarian or political preferences is the only proper and safe way for providing an education that shall meet the wants of the future and carry out the founders' idea of an Institution where "any person can find instruction in any study." I herewith commit this great trust to your care.

== Infrastructure innovations ==
Between 1872 and 1875, the university's first professor of physics William Arnold Anthony and student George S Moler (later, a professor at Cornell) installed two electric arc lamps on campus, one of which was in the Sage Chapel tower. The set-up represented many firsts, the first dynamo and outdoor electric lighting in the United States, and the world's first underground electricity distribution system. It was said to be the "first locality in America, if not the world, to have a permanent installation of electric arc lamps." The lamps were "visible for many miles around, and it excited the wonder of the inhabitants."

In 1883, Cornell was one of the first university campuses to use electricity to light the grounds from a water-powered dynamo. In 1904, a hydroelectric plant was built in the Fall Creek gorge. The plant takes water from Beebe Lake through a tunnel in the side of the gorge to power up to 1.9 megawatts of electricity. The plant continued to serve the campus's electric needs until 1970, when local utility rates placed a heavy economic penalty on independently generating electricity. The abandoned plant was vandalized in 1972, but renovated and placed back into service in 1981.

In 1986–87, a cogeneration facility was added to the central heating plant to generate electricity from the plant's waste heat. A Cornell Combined Heat & Power Project, which was completed in December 2009, shifted the central heating plant from using coal to natural gas and enable the plant to generate all of the campus's non-peak electric requirements.

In the 1880s, a suspension bridge was built across Fall Creek to provide pedestrian access to the campus from the North. In 1913, Professors S.C. Hollister and William McGuire designed a new suspension bridge that is 138 ft (42 m), 3.5 in. above the water and 500 ft (150 m) downstream from the original. However, the second bridge was declared unsafe and closed August 1960 to be rebuilt with a replacement of the same design.

The Arecibo Observatory, radio and radar telescope, from its construction in the 1960s until 2011, was managed by Cornell University.

Cornell began operating a closed loop, central chilled water system for air conditioning and laboratory cooling in the 1963 using centralized mechanical chillers, rather than inefficient, building-specific air conditioners. In 2000, Cornell began operation of its Lake Source Cooling System which uses the cold water temperature at the bottom of Cayuga Lake (approx 39 °F) to air condition the campus. The system was the first wide-scale use of lake source cooling in North America.

== Giving and alumni involvement ==
The first endowed chair at Cornell was the Professorship of Hebrew and Oriental Literature and History donated by New York City financier Joseph Seligman in 1874, with the proviso that he (Seligman) would nominate the chairholder; and following his wishes, Dr. Felix Adler (Society for Ethical Culture), was appointed. After two years, Professor Adler was quietly let go. Seligman demanded an inquiry. On rebuffing Joseph Seligman in 1877, the trustees established one of their guiding principles governing the receipt of gifts, "That in the future no Endowment of Professorships will be accepted by the (Cornell) University which deprives the Board of Trustees of the power to Select The persons who shall fill such professorships".

In September 1896, Cornell's president Jacob Gould Schurman prevailed upon the board of trustees to extend an offer to Nathaniel Schmidt. The situation at Colgate's Divinity School had deteriorated. Schmidt's unorthodox theology generated discomfort within that college. From 1886 to the arrival of Professor Nathaniel Schmidt in 1896, Cornell's Library maintained its support for the acquisition of Near Eastern materials. Taking over as Cornell President, Jacob Gould Schurman decided Cornell needed a chair of Hebrew language. In 1896, Schurman persuaded Henry W. Sage to finance a professor of Semitic Languages and Literatures for AY1896-97 and AY 1897-98. He knew the university could secure Schmidt at a bargain. Schmidt's unorthodox theological views made his stay at Colgate Divinity School untenable. Schmidt gained the respect of the Cornell community. Noted for his personal and scholarly integrity, he was soon shielded by sympathetic administrators. Schmidt served Cornell for thirty-six years, carrying a high teaching load in addition to this extensive research. He taught an elementary course in Hebrew each year. Advanced Hebrew covered the leading writers of the Old Testament and some parts of the Mishnaic and other Talmudic literature in three years. General linguistics students were advised to begin their study of Semitic languages with Arabic, also offered each year. Aramaic and Egyptian alternated with Assyrian and Ethiopic. The Semitic Seminary, given one term each year, was dedicated to epigraphical studies.

The second was the Susan E. Linn Sage Professor of Ethics and Philosophy given in 1890 by Henry W. Sage. Since then, 327 named professorships have been established, of which 43 are honorary and do not have endowments. The university's first endowed scholarship was established in 1892.

The original University charter adopted by the New York State legislature required that Cornell give scholarships from students in each legislative district to attend the university tuition-free. Although both Cornell and White believed this meant one scholarship, the legislature later argued that it meant one new freshman student per district each year, or four per district. This allowed students of diverse financial resources to attend the university from the start.

When Atlantic Gulf & Pacific Dredging Company President John McMullen left his estate to Cornell to establish scholarships for engineering students, Cornell's trustees decided to invest those funds and eventually sold the dredging company. The resulting fund is Cornell's largest single scholarship endowment. Since 1925, the fund has provided substantial assistance to more than 3,700 engineering students. (Cornell has received a number of unusual non-cash (in-kind) gifts over the years, including: Ezra Cornell's farm, the Cornell Aeronautical Laboratory (see below), a copy of Lincoln's Gettysburg Address, a Peruvian mummy, and the Ostrander elm trees.)

Before the university opened, the State Legislature amended Cornell's charter on April 24, 1867 to specify alumni elected trustees. However that provision did not become operative until there were at least 100 alumni in 1872. Cornell was one of the first Universities to elect trustees by direct election. (Harvard was probably the first to shift to direct election of its Board of Overseers by alumni in 1865.) Cornell's first female trustee was Martha Carey Thomas (class of 1877), who the alumni elected while she was serving as President of Bryn Mawr College.

In October 1890, Andrew Carnegie became a Cornell Trustee and quickly became aware of the lack of an adequate pension plans for Cornell faculty. His concern led to the formation in 1905 of what is now called Teachers Insurance and Annuity Association of America (TIAA). In October 2010, David A. Atkinson and his wife Patricia donated $80 million to fund a sustainability center, and the gift is currently the largest single gift to Cornell (ignoring inflation) and is the largest ever given to a university for sustainability research and faculty support.

Many alumni classes elected secretaries to maintain correspondence with classmates. In 1905, the Class Secretaries organized to form what is now called the Cornell Association of Class Officers, which meets annually to develop alumni class programs and assist in organizing reunions. The Cornell Alumni News is an independent, alumni-owned publication founded in 1899 It is owned and controlled by the Cornell Alumni Association, a separate nonprofit corporation and is now known as Cornell Alumni Magazine.

== Support from New York State ==
Under the Morrill Act, states were obligated to fund the maintenance of land grant college facilities, but were not obligated to fund operations. Subsequent laws required states to match federal funds for agricultural research stations and cooperative extension. In his inaugural address as Cornell's third president on November 11, 1892, Jacob Gould Schurman announced his intention to enlist the financial support of the state. Until that point, Cornell's relationship with the state was a net economic loss. Cornell was offering full scholarships to four students in each New York assembly district every year and was spending funds to serve as the state's land-grant university. It determined to convince the state to become a benefactor of the university, instead. In 1894, the state legislature voted to give financial support for the establishment of the New York State College of Veterinary Medicine and to make annual appropriations for the college. This set the precedents of privately controlled, state-supported statutory colleges and cooperation between Cornell and the state. The annual state appropriations were later extended to agriculture, home economics, and following World War II, industrial and labor relations.

In 1882, Cornell opened the New York State Agricultural Experiment Station in Geneva, New York, the sixth oldest institution of its kind in the United States. It made significant advances in scientific agriculture and for many years played an active role in agriculture law enforcement.

In 1900, a home economics curriculum was added to Cornell's Agriculture college. This was expanded to a separate state-supported school in 1919. The Home Economics School, in turn, began to develop classes in hotel administration in 1922, which spun off into a separate, endowed college in 1950.

In 1898, the New York State College of Forestry opened at Cornell, which was the first forestry college in North America. The college undertook to establish a 30,000-acre (120 km^{2}) demonstration forest in the Adirondacks, funded by New York State. However, the plans of the school's director Bernhard Fernow for the land drew criticism from neighbors living on Saranac Lake, Knollwood Club, and Governor Benjamin B. Odell vetoed the 1903 appropriation for the school. In response, Cornell closed the school. By some reports, Cornell gained annual state funding of the College of Agriculture in exchange for closing the forestry college. Subsequently, in 1911, the State Legislature established a New York State College of Forestry at Syracuse University, and the remains of Cornell's program became the Department of Natural Resources in its Agriculture College in 1910. However, Cornell had contracted with the Brooklyn Cooperage Company to take the logs from the forest, and the People of the State of New York, Knollwood Club members ("People v. the Brooklyn Cooperage Company and Cornell") sued to stop the destructive practices of Fernow even before the closing of the school. Cornell University lost the case in 1910 and on appeal in 1912. Cornell eventually established a research forest south of Ithaca, the Arnot Woods. When New York State later funded the construction of a Forestry building for the Agriculture school, New York State College of Agriculture and Life Sciences, Cornell named it Fernow Hall.

In 1914, the US Department of Agriculture began to fund cooperative extension services through the land-grant college of each state, and Cornell expanded its impact by sending agents to spread knowledge in each county of New York State. Although Syracuse had started awarding forestry degrees at this point, Cornell's extension agents covered all of home economics and agriculture, including forestry.

In 1945, the New York State Legislature founded the New York State School of Industrial and Labor Relations at Cornell, in response to requests from organized labor and Democratic leaders. The school quickly gained national stature when U.S. Secretary of Labor Frances Perkins, who was the first female US Cabinet member and served longer than anyone else as Secretary of Labor (12 years), joined the ILR faculty. Since agricultural interests were mostly affiliated with the Republicans, Cornell enjoyed bi-partisan support following World War II.

In 1948, the Legislature placed all state-funded higher education into the new State University of New York (SUNY). Cornell's four statutory colleges (agriculture, human ecology, labor relations and veterinary medicine) have been affiliated with SUNY since its inception, but did not have any such state affiliation prior to that time. Statutory college employees legally are employees of Cornell, not employees of SUNY. The State Education Law gives SUNY's board of trustees the authority to approve Cornell's appointment of the deans/unit heads of the statutory colleges, and control of the level of state funding for the statutory colleges.

Today, state support is significant. In 2007–08, Cornell received a total of $174 million of state appropriations for operations. Of the $2.5 billion in capital spending budgeted for 2007–2017, $721 million was to come from the state of New York.

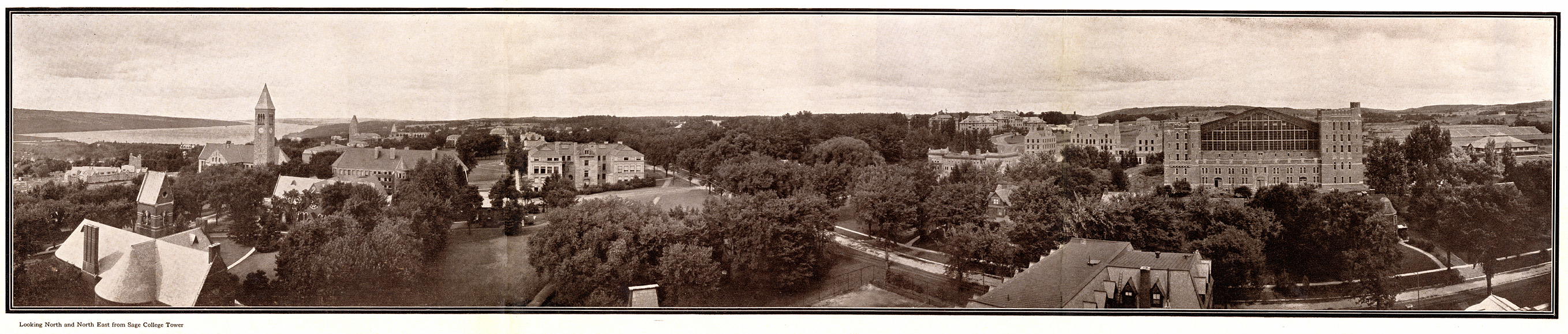
Cornell University Campus in 1919

== Medical education ==
Starting in 1878, Cornell's Ithaca campus offered a pre-medical school curriculum, although most medical students enrolled in medical school directly after high school. In 1896, three New York City institutions, the University Medical College, the Loomis Laboratory and the Bellevue Hospital Medical College united with the goal of affiliating with New York University (NYU). Unfortunately, NYU imposed a number of surprising new policies including limiting faculty to what they would have otherwise earned in private practice. The faculty revolted in 1897 and sought the return of the property of the three former institutions, with a resulting lawsuit. On March 22, 1904 and April 5, 1904, the New York State Court of Appeals ordered NYU to return property to Loomis Laboratory because the NYU Dean had breached oral promises made to form the merger. Having won their separation from NYU, the medical faculties sought a new university affiliation, and on April 14, 1898, Cornell's board of trustees voted to create a medical school and elected former NYU professors as its dean and faculty. The school opened on October 4, 1898 in the Loomis Laboratory facilities. In 1900, a new campus on First Avenue on the Upper East Side of Manhattan opened which was donated by Oliver Hazard Payne. Cornell also began a program in the fall of 1898 to allow students to take their first two years of medical school in Ithaca, with Stimson Hall being constructed to house that program. The building opened in 1903. The M.D. degree program was open to both men and women, but women were required to study in Ithaca for their first two years. In 1908, Cornell was one of the early medical schools to require an undergraduate degree as a prerequisite to admission to the M.D. program. In 1913, Cornell's medical school affiliated with New York Hospital as its teaching hospital. Unlike the New York branch of the medical school which was well endowed, the Ithaca branch was subsidized by the university, and the Trustees reduced its scope to just first year students in 1910, and eventually phased it out.

Weill Cornell

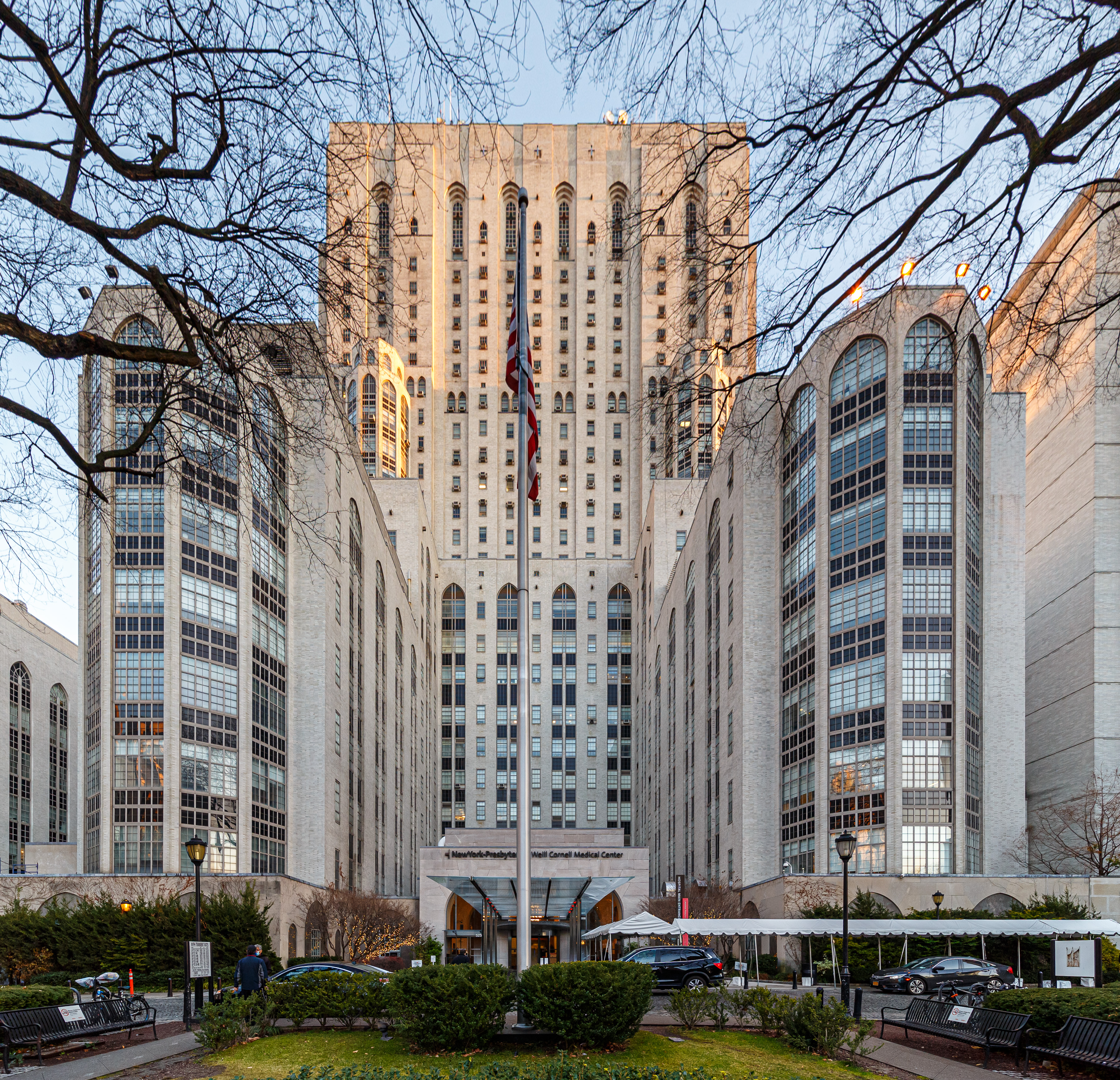
New York-Presbyterian/Weill Cornell Medical Center (68th Street)

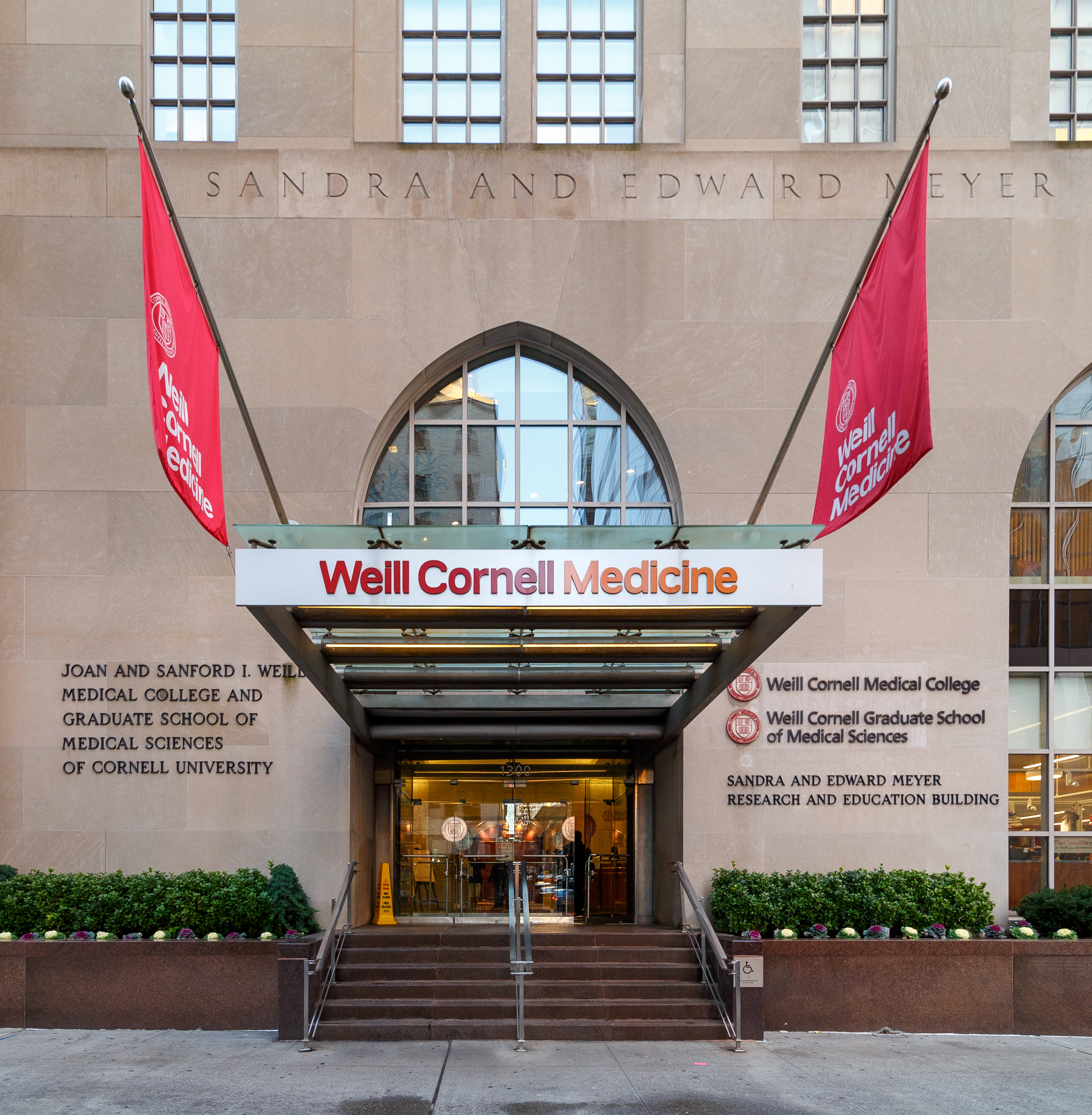
Weill Cornell Medicine (York Avenue)

In 1927, William Payne Whitney's $27 million donation led to the building of the Payne Whitney Psychiatric Clinic, which became the name for Weill Cornell's large psychiatric effort. That same year, the college became affiliated with New York Hospital and the two institutions moved to their current joint campus in 1932. The hospital's Training School for Nurses became affiliated with the university in 1942, operating as the Cornell Nursing School until it closed in 1979.

In 1998, Cornell University Medical College's affiliate hospital, New York Hospital, merged with Presbyterian Hospital (the affiliate hospital for Columbia University College of Physicians and Surgeons). The combined institution operates today as NewYork-Presbyterian Hospital. Despite the clinical alliance, the faculty and instructional functions of the Cornell and Columbia units remain distinct and independent. Multiple fellowships and clinical programs have merged, however, and the institutions are continuing in their efforts to bring together departments, which could enhance academic efforts, reduce costs, and increase public recognition. All hospitals in the NewYork-Presbyterian Healthcare System are affiliated with one of the two colleges.

Also in 1998, the medical college was renamed as Weill Medical College of Cornell University after receiving a substantial endowment from Sanford I. Weill, then Chairman of Citigroup.

== Cornell Aeronautical Laboratory ==
Curtiss-Wright built this lab facility located in the suburbs of Buffalo, New York as a part of the World War II effort. As a part of its tax planning in the wake of the war effort, Curtiss-Wright donated the facility to Cornell University to operate "as a public trust" and received a charitable tax deduction. Seven other east coast aircraft companies also donated $675,000 to provide working capital for the lab. The lab operated under the name Cornell Aeronautical Laboratory from 1946 until 1972. During this same time, Cornell formed a new Graduate School of Aerospace Engineering on its Ithaca, New York campus.

CAL invented the first crash test dummy in 1948, the automotive seat belt in 1951, the first mobile field unit with Doppler weather radar for weather-tracking in 1956, the first accurate airborne simulation of another aircraft (the North American X-15) in 1960, the first successful demonstration of an automatic terrain-following radar system in 1964, the first use of a laser beam to successfully measure gas density in 1966, the first independent HYGE sled test facility to evaluate automotive restraint systems in 1967, the mytron, an instrument for research on neuromuscular behavior and disorders in 1969, and the prototype for the Federal Bureau of Investigation's fingerprint reading system in 1972. CAL served as an "honest broker" making objective comparisons of competing plans to build military hardware. It also conducted classified counter-insurgency research in Thailand for the Defense Department. By the time of its divestiture, CAL had 1,600 employees. CAL conducted wind tunnel test on models of a number of skyscraper buildings, including most notably the John Hancock Tower in Boston, Massachusetts and the 40-story Commerce House in Seattle, Washington.

During the late 1960s and early 1970s, universities came under criticism for conducting war-related research particularly as the Vietnam War became unpopular, and Cornell University tried to sever its ties. Cornell accepted a $25,000,000 offer from EDP Technology, Inc. to purchase the lab in 1968. However, a group of lab employees who had made a competing $15,000,000 offer organized a lawsuit to block the sale. In May 1971, New York's highest court ruled that Cornell had the right to sell the lab. At the conclusion of the suit, EDP Technology could not raise the money, and in 1972, Cornell reorganized the lab as the for-profit Calspan Corporation and then sold its stock in Calspan to the public.

== Race relations ==
Cornell had enrolled African-American students by the mid-1880s. On December 4, 1906, Alpha Phi Alpha, the first Greek letter fraternity for African-Americans was founded at Cornell. Cornell had a very low black enrollment until the 1960s, when it formed the Committee on Special Educational Projects (COSEP) to recruit and mentor minority students. In 1969, Cornell established its Africana Studies and Research Center, one of the first such black studies programs in the Ivy League. On April 1, 1970, during a period of heightened racial tension, the building that housed the Africana Studies center burned down. Since 1972, Ujamaa, a special interest program dormitory located in North Campus Low Rise No. 10, provides housing for many non-white students. However, in 1974, the New York State Board of Regents ordered it desegregated, and its status remained controversial for years.

=== Willard Straight Hall Takeover ===
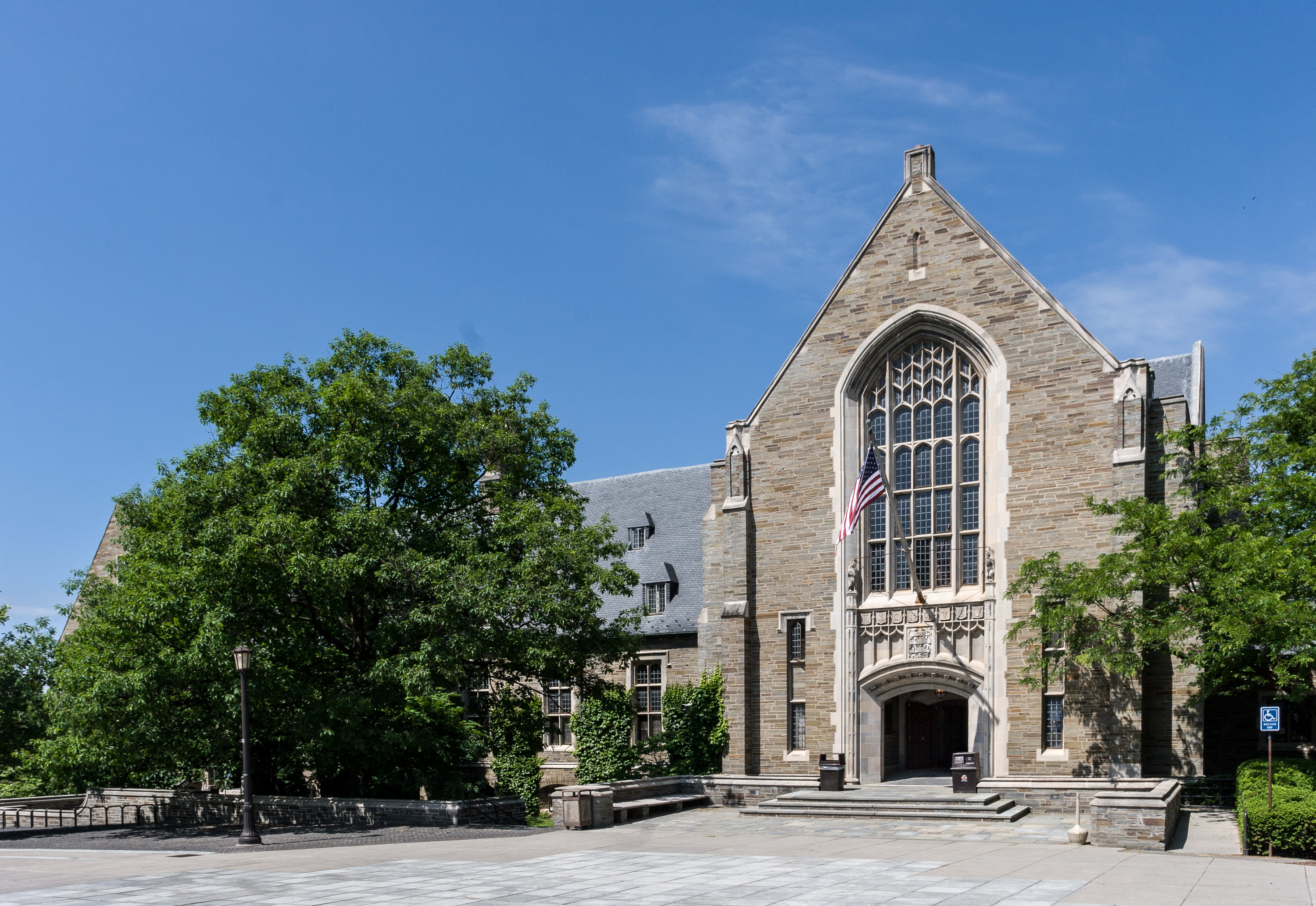
Willard Straight Hall.

On April 19, 1969, during a parents' weekend, over 80 members of Cornell's Afro-American Society took over the student union building, Willard Straight Hall. The takeover was precipitated by increasing racial tension at the university and the students' frustration with the administration's lack of support for a black studies program. The specific catalysts for the takeover were a reprimand of three black students for an incident the previous December and a cross burning in front of the black women's cooperative and other cases of racism.

By the following day a deal was brokered between the students and university officials, and on April 20, the takeover ended, with the administration ceding to some of the Afro-American Society's demands. The students emerged making a black-power salute and with guns in hand (the guns had been brought into Willard Straight Hall after the initial takeover). James A. Perkins, president of Cornell during the events, resigned soon after the crisis.

Some of the elements of the deal required faculty approval, and the faculty voted to uphold the reprimands of the three students on April 21. The faculty was asked to reconsider, and a group of 2,000 to 10,000 gathered in Barton Hall to debate the matter as the faculty deliberated. This "Barton Hall Community" formed a representative Constituent Assembly which undertook a comprehensive review of the university. Among the changes stemming from the crisis were the founding of an Africana Studies and Research Center, overhaul of the campus governance and judicial system, and the addition of students to Cornell's board of trustees. The crisis also prompted New York to enact the Henderson Law requiring every college in the state to adopt rules for the maintenance of public order.

Historian Donald Kagan was a professor at Cornell from 1958 to 1969 and left Cornell due to the takeover. Kagan was once a liberal democrat, but his views changed after the takeover and became one of the original signers to the 1997 Statement of Principles by the neoconservative think tank Project for the New American Century. According to Jim Lobe, Kagan's turn away from liberalism occurred in 1969 when Cornell University was pressured into starting a "Black Studies" program by gun-wielding students seizing Willard Straight Hall on campus: "Watching administrators demonstrate all the courage of Neville Chamberlain had a great impact on me, and I became much more conservative."

Former Cornell Professor Thomas Sowell also left Cornell over the takeover. Sowell characterized the students as "hoodlums" with "serious academic problems [and] admitted under lower academic standards" and noted "it so happens that the pervasive racism that black students supposedly encountered at every turn on campus and in town was not apparent to me during the four years that I taught at Cornell and lived in Ithaca."

== Interdisciplinary studies ==
Historically, Cornell's colleges have operated with great autonomy, each with a separate admissions policy, separate faculty, separate fundraising staff and in many cases, separate tuition structure. However, the university has taken steps to encourage collaboration between related academic fields within the university and with outside organizations. In the 1960s, the university created a Division of Biological Sciences to unify related programs in the Art and Agriculture colleges. Although a success, the structure was ultimately dropped in 1999 due to difficulty with funding.

The Faculty of Computing and Information Science was established in 1999 to unify computer science efforts throughout the university. Students still enrolled in one of the existing colleges. For its first ten years, Robert Constable served as its dean. In 2020, it became the Ann S. Bowers College of Computing and Information Science.

== Affordability and use of the endowment ==
Since the 1970s, tuition at Cornell and other Ivy League schools has grown much faster than inflation. This trend coincided with the creation of Federally guaranteed student loan programs. At the same time, the endowments of these schools continue to grow due to gifts and successful investments. Critics called for universities to keep their tuition at affordable levels and to not hoard endowment earnings. As a result, in 2008, Cornell and other Ivy Schools decided to increase the spending of endowment earnings in order to subsidize tuition for low and middle income families, reducing the amount of debt that Cornell students will incur. Cornell also placed a priority to soliciting endowed scholarships for undergraduates. In fall 2007, Cornell had 1,863 undergraduates (14% of all undergraduates) receiving federal Pell Grants. Cornell's Pell Grant students roughly totals the combined Pell Grant recipients studying at Harvard, Princeton and Yale.

== COVID-19 pandemic ==
On March 10, 2020, Cornell announced that all classes were moving to virtual instruction for the rest of the spring semester. Research facilities reopened in late May 2020. Classes in the Fall 2020 and Spring 2021 semesters were largely conducted virtually, though some offered in-person opportunities and experiences. Cornell held a virtual graduation event for the Class of 2020 on June 13, 2021, and an in-person event on September 19, 2021.

In June 2021, Cornell announced that the Fall 2021 semester would be fully in-person provided cases remained low; in December 2021, Cornell moved all classes online at its Ithaca campus in response to a surge in positive cases and detection of the omicron variant.

=== Vaccine mandate ===
Following the rollout of COVID-19 vaccines in the United States, Cornell mandated all students be fully vaccinated by December 15, 2021, and all faculty and staff by January 18, 2022 (pushed back from an initial deadline of December 15).

== 2024 fraternity alleged gang rape ==
In October 2024, an alleged gang rape at the Chi Phi fraternity house led to a major institutional crisis. After internal university discipline was heavily criticized and a civil lawsuit was filed in 2026, Kathy Hochul stripped local prosecutors of the case due to systemic mishandling of evidence and appointed the New York Attorney General to lead a grand jury investigation.

== Portrayal in fiction ==
Students and faculty have chronicled Cornell in works of fiction. One was The Widening Stain, which first appeared pseudonymously, in 1942, but was soon revealed to have been written by the Cornell professor Morris Bishop. Alison Lurie wrote a fictional account of the campus during the Vietnam War protests titled The War Between the Tates. Matt Ruff captured Cornell around 1985 in The Fool on the Hill. Richard Fariña wrote a novel based on a real 1958 protest led by Kirkpatrick Sale against in loco parentis policies in Been Down So Long It Looks Like Up to Me. Steve Thayer takes his readers to the Cornell campus in Ithaca Falls, a mystery thriller about a Cornell criminologist who travels back to 1929 in pursuit of a serial killer. Ed Helms' character Andrew Bernard of the TV show The Office was an alumnus of Cornell University.

== See also ==
- For the history of the Ithaca campus, see:
- Cornell Central Campus
- Cornell North Campus
- Cornell West Campus
