= Through Darkest Europe =

2018 alternate history novel

- Author: Harry Turtledove
- Language: English
- Genre: Alternate history
- Publisher: Tor Books
- Publication date: September 18, 2018
- Publication place: United States
- Pages: 320
- ISBN: 9780765379986

Through Darkest Europe (previously announced as God Wills It) is an alternate history novel by Harry Turtledove. The book is set in an alternate present in which Islamic countries form a prosperous, democratic and progressive First World, while underdeveloped Christian countries suffer from religious fanaticism.

== Plot ==
In this alternate world, the dominating Muslim cultures of North Africa and the Middle East are "liberal, tolerant, and above all rich." Europe meanwhile is a hot spot of Christian fundamentalism, with assassinations, hijackings, and bombings committed by extremist groups such as the Aquinists. Senior Investigator Khalid al-Zarzisi is sent to Rome with his partner Investigator Dawud ibn Musa with the mission of protecting the Grand Duke (monarch of all Italy), the impoverished Pope, and preventing European instability from affecting the First World.

The alternate history's point of departure, as detailed in the first chapter, occurred between the 11th and 13th centuries due to different developments in Christian theology and Islamic theology. Thomas Aquinas, who in the real world sought to reconcile religion and reason, taught that Christianity and reason were incompatible, and that religious faith should override reason. Conversely, Al-Ghazali, who in the real world argued that Islamic faith was superior to philosophy and science, thought that the two were compatible.

The developed First World has advanced science, including Turkish Moon landings. Classical Arabic is used as a world language spoken by the educated and used in standard signs. Muslim culture, language, and style spread around the world with the spread of modernity.

== See also ==
- The Years of Rice and Salt by Kim Stanley Robinson
- The Mirage by Matt Ruff
- Lion's Blood by Steven Barnes
