= Abraham Burickson =

American writer (born 1975)

- Born: 1975; New York City, New York, U.S.
- Education: Cornell University; University of Texas
- Occupations: poet, writer, conceptual artist
- Organization: Odyssey Works
- Website: www.abrahamburickson.com

Abraham Burickson (born 1975) is an American poet, writer, and conceptual artist.

== Early life and education ==
Abraham Burickson was born in New York City, the son of Sherwin Burickson. He earned a BA in architecture from Cornell University, having changed his major from English and anthropology. In 2008 he received an MFA from the Michener Center for Writers at the University of Texas.

== Career ==
In 2001, with actor Matthew Purdon, Burickson co-founded the conceptual art and performance group Odyssey Works, becoming its artistic director and co-director of its Experience Design Certificate program. In 2009 he founded an interdisciplinary retreat, the Odyssey Lab. He heads the Long Architecture Project, which bases architectural design on deep analysis of clients' values and aims.

Burickson was a James Michener Fellow in Poetry at the Michener Center for Writers from 2005 to 2008. He also received a fellowship from the Millay Colony for the Arts in 2005, and in 2010 was Artist-in-Residence at Risley Residential College at Cornell. He has taught at Maryland Institute College of Art and at Academy of Art University. In 2018, he won the Mary Sawyers Baker Prize for Interdisciplinary Art.

In 2016, with Ayden LeRoux, he published Odyssey Works: Transformative Experiences for an Audience of One, which consists of six essays outlining Odyssey Works' approach to art-making as experience design. His 2023 book Experience Design: A Participatory Manifesto seeks to redirect design from things to experiences.

== Publications ==
=== Books ===
- with Ayden LeRoux. Odyssey Works: Transformative Experiences for an Audience of One. Princeton Architectural Press, 2016. ISBN 9781616895150.
- Experience Design: A Participatory Manifesto. Yale University Press, 2023. ISBN 9780300269475.

=== Chapbooks ===
- Charlie. Codhill Press, 2010. ISBN 9781930337497.

=== Anthology appearances ===
- "At the Barbecue Joint, Taylor, Texas". In: Best New Poets 2008. Ed. Mark Strand. University of Virginia Press, 2008. ISBN 9780976629634.
