= Risley Residential College =

Residence hall at Cornell University

- Residential college, Dining hall, Theater
- Cornell University
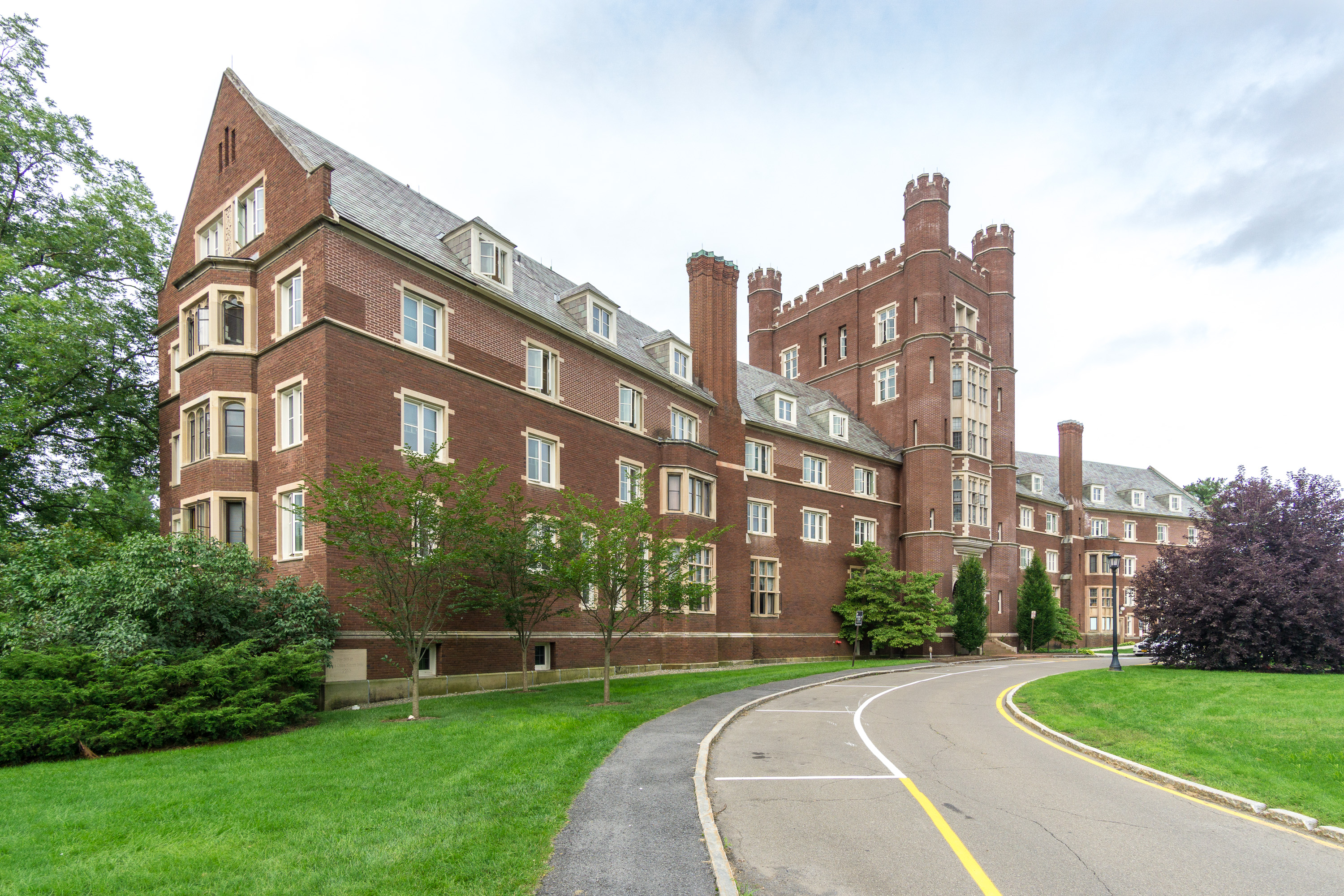
- Risley Residential College in August 2018
- Location: North Campus, Ithaca, New York, U.S.
- Coordinates: 42.45307°N 76.481962°W
- Established: 1913
- Namesake: Prudence Risley
- Architect: William Henry Miller
- Architectural style: Tudor gothic
- Benefactor: Margaret Olivia Slocum Sage
- Website: risley.org

Prudence Risley Residential College for the Creative and Performing Arts, commonly known as Risley Residential College, Risley Hall, or just Risley, is a program house (themed residence hall) at Cornell University. Unlike most other dormitories on campus, Risley is a residential college; house members, or "Risleyites," have some say in the administration of the residence hall, can continue to reside there as long as they are enrolled at Cornell, are encouraged to eat together at the in-house dining hall, and participate in educational activities such as guest lectures within the dormitory.

== History ==
Early Risley Hall

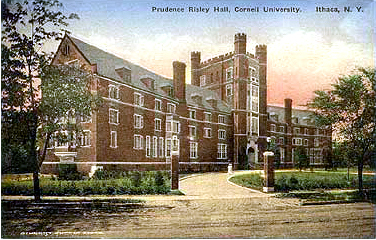
Postcard of Risley Residential College, c. 1910s

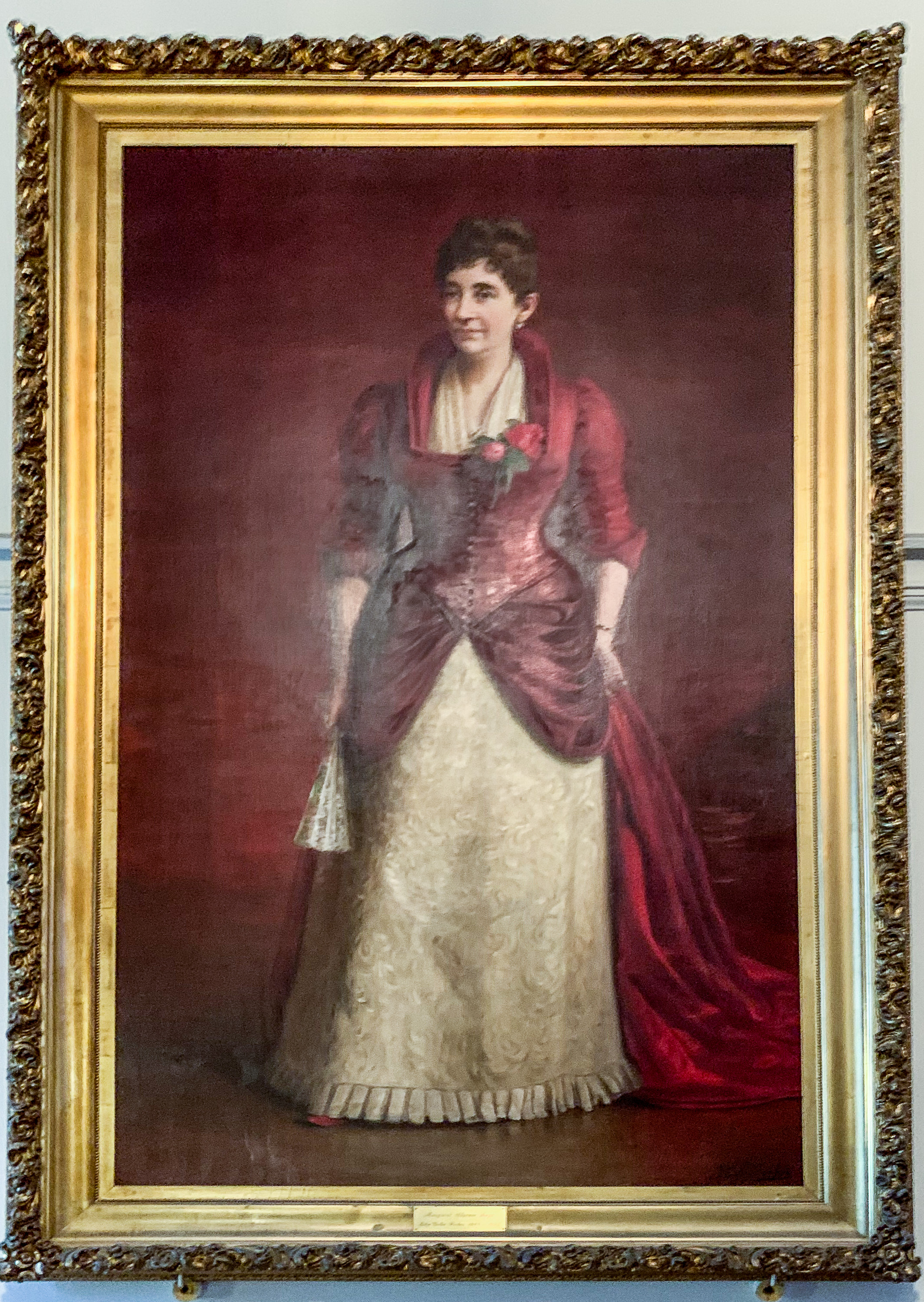
Portrait of Margaret Slocum Sage in Risley Residential College

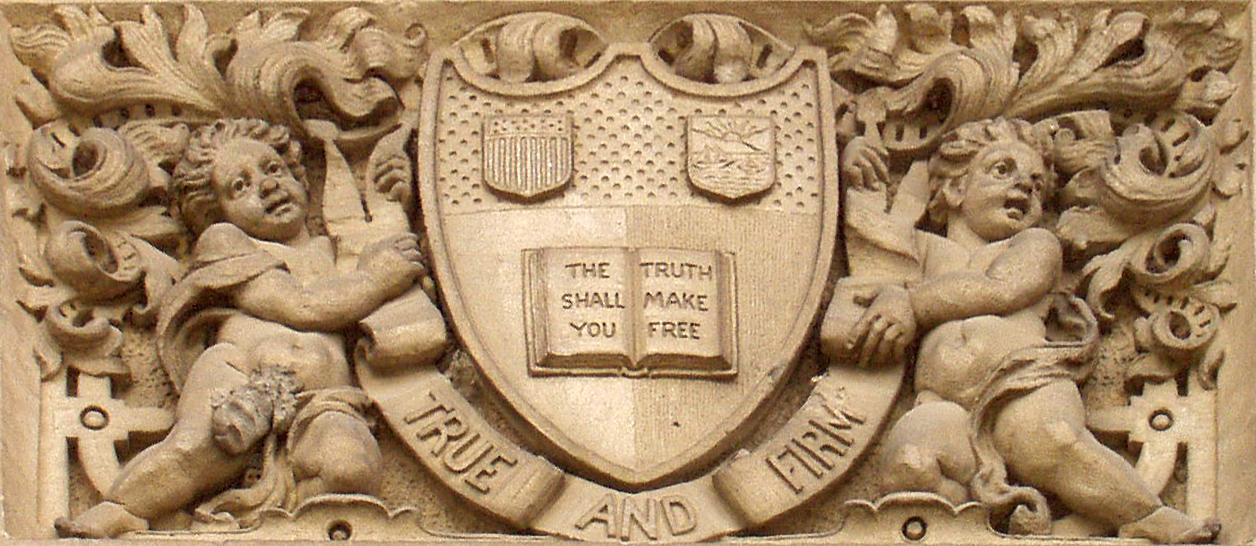
Stonework detail bearing Risley's historical motto "The Truth Will Make You Free" and "True and Firm" (Treu und Fest), a German motto Andrew Dickson White had first suggested to fellow university co-founder Ezra Cornell to adorn his mansion.

In 1911, Margaret Olivia Slocum Sage, a progressive philanthropist and the widow of financier Russell Sage, donated $300,000 (equivalent to $11.4 million in 2025) to the university for the construction of a women's dormitory. At her request, the building was named after her husband's mother, Prudence Risley. Financier and Cornell trustee Emerson McMillin donated an additional $20,000 (equivalent to $691,071 in 2025) to purchase the requisite five-acre lot, the first expansion of Cornell's footprint north of the Fall Creek gorge, the beginning of the modern day North Campus.

The building was opened to students in 1913. It was unusually luxurious, with sculptures and expensive furnishings in common areas, many of which were donated by Cornell co-founder Andrew Dickson White.

In approximately 1969-70, undergraduates Judith Goodman ('71) and Gail Hassan ('71) developed a proposal to create university housing specifically for students interested in the arts, as well as decidated performance, practice, and other creative spaces. The Associate Dean of Students, Ruth Darling, was supportive of the proposal, which asked for 40 housing units, but, if there was sufficient demand, they might use Risley Hall. Student interest was overwhelming: the university received over 1000 applications for the roughly 200 spots in the building. Having demonstrated student interest in such a dormatory, in fall 1970, Risley Hall thus became the home of Risley Residential College for the Fine and Performing Arts, Cornell's first "program house."

== People ==
The building houses 196 students, chosen by Risleyites from a number of applications. Notable former Risley residents from before the creation of Risley Residential College include Margaret Bourke-White', Elspeth Huxley, Barbara McClintock, Helen Reichert, and Janet Reno. Notable residents from after the creation of the Residential College include Matt Ruff, Mia Korf, Jamie Silverstein, Christopher Reeve, Andre Balazs, Madalyn Aslan, Duo Dickinson, Andrew C. Greenberg, David Conte, Jared Emerson-Johnson, Adam Becker, Yoon Ha Lee, Elizabeth Neuffer, and Keith Raywood.

In addition to students, Risley houses one or two Artists-In-Residence ("AIRs"), who live in the building and organize regular programs in which the house members participate. There is not currently an Artist-In-Residence. Previous AIRs include Georgia O'Neil, Patrick Gray, Carolina Osorio-Gill, Natalie Tyler, Abraham Burickson, Gregory Halpern, and Brandon Bird.

Many famous people have visited the house for intimate discussions with the Risleyites, such as Anthony Rapp, Christopher Hogwood, John Cleese, who hosted a question and answer session after the showing of his film A Fish Called Wanda, and Samuel R. Delany who continues to collaborate with Risley alumnus Kenneth James.

== Facilities ==
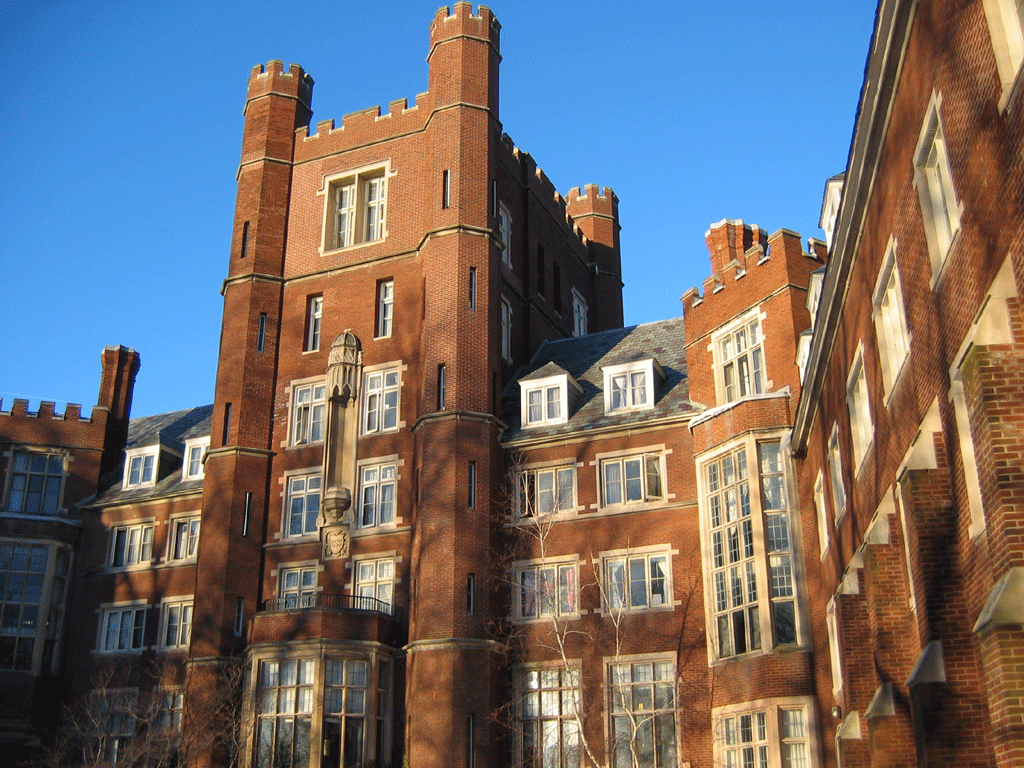
Risley Residential College seen from its courtyard

Risley Residential College offers archiecturally distinctive living experience at Cornell, as a Tudor Gothic-style dormitory resembling a large red-brick castle. The building, designed by architect William H. Miller, is modeled after Hampton Court Palace in England . At the request of its benefactors, the floor plan was designed so that no two rooms would be identical, resulting in a wide variety of room layouts. Room sizes range from a single unit of 93 square feet (9 m²), originally a maid’s quarters, to a double room measuring 273 square feet (25 m²), which is the largest double occupancy room on campus. Architectural features include balconies, fireplaces, dumbwaiter shafts, secret stairwells, bay windows, embrasures, and turrets.

The Risley Great Hall, built at the request of Andrew Dickson White, is a scaled-down replica of the dining hall at Christ Church, Oxford. It features a prominent stained-glass window depicting English social reformer Elizabeth Fry, U.S. First Lady Abigail Adams, and Scottish polymath Mary Somerville. Additionally, it serves as the university’s only gluten-free dining hall.

The residence provides spaces dedicated to student creativity, including a theater, music practice rooms, art workshops, a recording studio, a darkroom, and a small library. Governance of the building is overseen by an elected student body, "Kommittee," which manages the budget, facility use, and allocation of resources. Students are permitted to paint interior walls, resulting in numerous murals throughout the hallways. The dormitory also houses "Tammany," a coffeehouse where regional bands perform..

Risley Theatre is an 81-seat black box theater that is housed in a converted ballroom. It is the only fully student-operated theater at the university and is managed by the Risley Theatre Subcommittee ("T-Sub"), a division of Kommittee. T-Sub is responsible for organizing performances, managing resources, funding student productions, and overseeing theater operations. All performances are open to the public.

== Traditions ==
Risley's great hall on Wizard's Feast Night

Risley hosts several annual events, many of which have become long-standing traditions for students and the local community. On the weekend before Halloween, students organize MasqueRave, a costumed dance party. The following weekend, the Denton Drama Troupe, an in-house student performance group, presents a live rendition of The Rocky Horror Picture Show in the Great Hall. This tradition, established in 1991 by Paula Berman, remains a popular event. Due to their large attendance, these events serve as major fundraisers for smaller student-led projects.

Other notable annual events include themed dinners, such as Wizard’s Feast, first held in 2005 and organized by resident Charlene Morales. The event featured a menu inspired by the Harry Potter series, including specially crafted dishes and beverages such as "butter beer." Kitchen director Lorna McNab designed the menu, and the event attracted over 200 attendees. Another longstanding tradition is the annual reading of Handel's Messiah.

In addition to these annual events, Risley also hosts several recurring weekly programs, many of which involve communal meals. Eat This! is a Wednesday night event where students prepare food for fellow residents, while RisBrunch (RizBrunch) follows a similar format on Saturdays at noon. Lost Coffee takes place on Monday nights, during which a student hides coffee, tea, and cookies somewhere in the building and provides clues for residents to locate them. Funding for these programs is allocated by Kommittee, the dormitory's student governance body.

A longstanding legend associated with Risley is the alleged haunting by Prudence Risley, often referred to as "Auntie Prue." Some students claim that she manifests by flickering lights within the building, though others attribute these occurrences to aging electrical systems and student folklore.

== See also ==
- Hutchinson Hall, University of Chicago

=== Risley in literature ===
- Fool on the Hill by Matt Ruff
- The Salt Point by Paul Russell
