= The Mirage (Ruff novel) =

2012 alternate history novel by Matt Ruff

- Book cover
- Author: Matt Ruff
- Cover artist: Oliver Munday
- Language: English
- Genre: Alternate history
- Publisher: Harper
- Publication date: February 7, 2012
- Publication place: United States
- Pages: 432 pp
- ISBN: 978-0-06-197622-3

The Mirage is an alternate history novel by American writer Matt Ruff, published in 2012 by Harper. The book centers on Mustafa, Samir, and Amal, who are agents of Halal, an organization of the United Arab States, a Middle Eastern version of the United States. The agents discover artifacts of our world and begin a quest to discover the truth.

== History ==
The idea for The Mirage came when Matt Ruff was asked by a television producer, who was a fan of Ruff's novel Bad Monkeys, whether he had an idea for a television series. In an interview, Ruff said, "I’d been wanting to write something about the September 11 attacks and the war on terror that would offer an unusual perspective while still being an engaging story, and I hit on this idea of setting a thriller in a world where the U.S. and the Middle East had traded places. That concept was a little too radical for television, so I decided to do it as a novel."

== Setting ==
The Mirage is set in an alternate history version of the year 2009. Much of the back story is revealed in excerpts from the Library of Alexandria, this world's version of Wikipedia, funded by Muammar Gaddafi. A politically united Arabia (analogous to the real-life Arab League) declared independence from the Ottoman Empire at the end of the 19th century and established itself as the United Arab States. Throughout the 20th century, Arabia grew to occupy most of the Middle East and North Africa and northern East Africa. Arabia intervened decisively in World War II on the Allied side, culminating in Adolf Hitler's beheading at Nuremberg in 1946.

Afterwards, in 1948, the United Arab States partitioned Germany into two states: a Jewish state and a Christian state. The Jewish state became known as Israel, and its capital is Berlin. This partition established religious districts in Jerusalem, and allowed for citizens of Israel to come to the city with a special visa. After the 1967 "Six-Day War," Israel occupies most of Bavaria, Swabia, and the West Bank of the Middle Rhine. The UAS and Israel are close allies in the war on terror. Israel does not have a good relationship with many of its European neighbors, with British Prime Minister David Irving calling for Israel's destruction.

North America, meanwhile, is divided among several feuding third-world nations. The largest, the Christian States of America (CSA), comprises 17 states along the East Coast and is under the dictatorial rule of an aging Lyndon B. Johnson. In 1990, the Kingdom of Mississippi is annexed, becoming the 18th state. The Evangelical Republic of Texas includes Texas, Oklahoma, New Mexico, and the Mexican state of Coahuila and is allied with the United Arab States. A nation known as the "Rocky Mountains Independent Territories" exists but is split up among small tribal factions, apparently stretching from Aspen to Oregon. The Pentecostal Gilead Heartland includes Ohio, Kentucky, Michigan, and Tennessee. A Mormon nation also exists, although based in Missouri rather than Utah. In 1990, an attempt by the CSA to annex the Kingdom of Louisiana, fueled by Lyndon Johnson's desire to claim Texas, resulted in the "Mexican Gulf War". Several events are stated to have taken place beforehand (a "Heartland War" between the CSA and a coalition of North American States which took place in the 1960's; an attempted 1958 military coup led by Richard Nixon against a Kennedy Administration; and a series of assassinations that followed against the aforementioned Kennedy family).

Dialogue throughout the novel mentions a terrorist group known as the World Christian Alliance (this timeline's equivalent of Al Qaeda) that uses the Rocky Mountains as its headquarters. It was also responsible for the terrorist attacks on November 9, 2001, when members crashed two hijacked planes into the Tigris and Euphrates World Trade Center Towers in Baghdad, another hitting the Arab Defense Ministry in Riyadh, and a fourth crashing after a struggle with the passengers in the Empty Quarter. It is not known who their leaders are or if they are aware of the mirage legend. The United Kingdom is this timeline's equivalent of Iran, having undergone a revolution in 1979. It is implied that Britain either never colonized India or that India became independent earlier than in our universe, since India appears to have fought in World War II on its own. During WW2, the UAS annexed the French North African Territories. The United Arab States is clearly stated to be the world's second-largest country by land area, which implies that Canada, like the United States, is also broken up into minor states. Latin America is not touched upon in the novel other than that Venezuela is an OPEC member that intervened in the Mexican Gulf War and that the Mexican state of Coahuila is a dependency of Texas. A Cold War analog, known as the "Cold Crusade", between the UAS and an Orthodox Union is mentioned. The major political parties in the United Arab States are the Arab Unity Party (the analog of the Democratic Party) and the Party of God, or POG for short (the analog of the Republican Party, often referred to as the "Grand Old Party" or GOP for short). Al Jazeera exists in this timeline as a Fox analogue with a morning talk show, called Jazeera and Friends. Fox also exists in the mirage timeline, but it appears to be reduced to being a propaganda center of Christian fundamentalists.

== Reception ==
Critical reception for The Mirage has been mixed, with Publishers Weekly saying that the book was "exactly what the best popular fiction should be." The New York Post stated, "Like Philip Roth's "The Plot Against America" – the premise behind Ruff's alternate-history novel is chilling." The San Francisco Chronicle called it "audacious new novel" and stated that the title "is studded throughout with delicious little alternate-world ironies concerning the war on terror and its various participants." Kirkus Reviews noted, "The writing is good, but the characters are hard to care about and the plot doesn’t feel properly resolved". The Seattle Times praised the "straightforwardness of Ruff's approach" and stated that it gave the book a "gravitas that serves as a nod of respect for what the United States, the Iraqis and the Afghanis farther afield have gone through." The Los Angeles Times criticized The Mirage by stating that Ruff's "premise is built on spectacle rather than believable fiction."

A number of reviewers have noted the novel's similarity to the premise of Philip K. Dick's The Man in the High Castle.

The Mirage was nominated for the Sidewise Award for Alternate History.

== See also ==
- Wikipedia in culture
- Through Darkest Europe by Harry Turtledove
