= Odyssey Works =

Performance collective founded in 2001 in San Francisco

Odyssey Works is an interdisciplinary performance collective founded by Abraham Burickson and Matthew Purdon in San Francisco in 2001. The group, composed of artists practicing in various disciplines (writers, composers, designers, actors, performance artists etc.), creates 24hr performances for just one person.

The group creates 24-36hr performances for one person audiences. According to The New York Times, "Odyssey Works tends to invite all manner of glancing comparisons: artists like Vito Acconci, Marina Abramović and Aaron Landsman; the interactive Punchdrunk play “Sleep No More”; the notion of relational aesthetics; and the largely European trend of performing theater for one person at a time." The performances, which are site specific and highly participatory, are part of the relational aesthetics movement in performance and art and find their roots in the situationist movement of the 1960s and the work of such directors as Jerzy Grotowski and Peter Brook.

A book about Odyssey Works' ouvre will be published in the Fall of 2016 by Princeton Architectural Press

Odyssey Works is currently directed by Abraham Burickson.
