= Bad Monkeys =

2007 psychological thriller novel by Matt Ruff

- First edition
- Author: Matt Ruff
- Cover artist: Will Staehle
- Language: English
- Genre: Psychological thriller
- Publisher: Harper
- Publication date: July 24, 2007
- Publication place: United States
- Pages: 240 pages

Bad Monkeys is a 2007 psychological thriller novel by American author Matt Ruff. It received mixed reviews in national media, but was subsequently optioned for film.

== Plot summary ==
The beginning of the book takes place in the mental disabilities wing of the Las Vegas Clark County Detention Center. A psychiatrist named Dr. Vale interviews Jane Charlotte, who is there for the murder of a man called Dixon. Jane claims that she works for a secret organization devoted to fighting evil and that she is the operative for the Department for the Final Disposition of Irredeemable Persons, which is also known as Bad Monkeys. She also claims that her job is to eliminate individuals who are guilty of heinous crimes, but might elude normal channels of justice. Jane tells her story to Dr. Vale about her life working with Bad Monkeys.

== Origins ==
Ruff has stated that Bad Monkeys is his "Philip K. Dick novel", and that, for this reason, the protagonist is named for Jane Charlotte Dick, Philip K. Dick's twin sister who died in infancy. He also states that the book was inspired by having watched an episode of South Park and, shortly thereafter, having read David Simon's Homicide: A Year on the Killing Streets.

== Reception ==
The book received mixed reviews in national media. In The New York Times Jonathan Ames wrote, "'Bad Monkeys,' allusions aside, is highly entertaining. It moves fast and keeps surprising you." The Los Angeles Times criticized the book's characters, conversation, and recycled ideas, ultimately concluding that while Ruff "does show flashes of the philosophical underpinnings found in his previous work", that "his talents are better suited to expansive worlds rather than this embedded chicanery". The Washington Post'' compared the book to the G. K. Chesterton novel The Man Who Was Thursday and the film The Matrix, noting that Bad Monkeys contained "so many ingenious fake-out layers that readers will find their heads spinning with awed delight by the book's frenetic climax".

Bad Monkeys received a 2008 Washington State Book Award for Fiction and a 2008 Alex Award from the American Library Association.

== Film adaptation ==
On July 20, 2016, Universal Pictures bought the film rights to the novel with Margot Robbie attached to star as Jane Charlotte.
