= Lovecraft Country (novel) =

2016 dark fantasy horror novel

- Author: Matt Ruff
- Cover artist: Jarrod Taylor
- Language: English
- Genre: Dark fantasy, horror
- Publisher: HarperCollins
- Publication date: 2016
- Publication place: United States
- Media type: Print
- Pages: 400
- ISBN: 9780062292087

Lovecraft Country is a 2016 dark fantasy Black horror novel by American writer Matt Ruff, exploring the conjunction between the horror fiction of H. P. Lovecraft and racism in the United States during the era of Jim Crow laws, as experienced by black science fiction fan Atticus Turner and his family. It was published by HarperCollins.

== Characters ==
The major characters include:

- Atticus Turner, a Black man, former soldier in the Korean war.
- Montrose Turner, Atticus's father.
- George Berry, Atticus's uncle (husband of Hippolyta).
- Hippolyta Berry, Atticus's aunt (wife of George).
- Letitia Dandridge, a neighborhood friend of Atticus's growing up in Chicago.
- Ruby Dandridge, Letitia's sister.
- Samuel Braithwhite, a White man, lodgemaster at Ardham sorcerers' coven.
- Caleb Braithwhite, Samuel's son.

== Plot ==
The book consists of eight interconnected stories:

=== Lovecraft Country ===
Atticus Turner, working in Florida after leaving the army, returns home to Chicago after receiving a mysterious letter from his estranged father, Montrose, saying he had left Chicago to go to Ardham, Massachusetts, where he believed he could find some information on Atticus's mother's family (previously unknown to them). Atticus, his uncle George, and his childhood friend Letitia drive to Ardham to find Montrose. They are chased, accosted, and later nearly murdered by racists on the way.

Once at Ardham they find a large manor house called Ardham Lodge. Atticus learns that he is the descendant of the Lodge's founder, Titus Braithwhite. Montrose is being held hostage, chained up in a basement. The current owner of the house, Samuel Braithwhite, is planning a ceremony with all of the members of his lodge (a sect of sorcerers called "The Order of the Ancient Dawn") during which he needs a Braithwhite descendant to be a conduit for some ancient power. Presumably this will kill Atticus. Caleb Braithwhite (Samuel's only son) is also in attendance and he secretly provides Atticus with an incantation to say during the ceremony. Atticus does this and it causes the unleashed power to consume Samuel and all the members of the lodge and turn them into dust while protecting Atticus.

Caleb releases Atticus, George, Montrose and Letitia and lets them leave to go back to Chicago.

=== Dreams of the Which House ===
Letitia receives an inheritance from her late mother, and uses it to buy, in a white neighborhood, a large 14-bedroom house called the Winthrop House (named after the original owner, Hiram Winthrop) which was being sold cheap due to it being haunted. Letitia plans on fixing it up and renting out the rooms. After moving in, she realizes that the house is haunted by Winthrop's ghost who is not too happy about sharing it with new residents. He and Letitia struggle and he nearly kills her until she convinces him that if he does she will stay as a ghost and haunt him back. After that, they come to an agreement and even find some peace over their shared love of playing games like chess. Letitia never sees Winthrop, but his pieces move on their own.

Meanwhile the white folks in the neighborhood quickly begin harassing Letitia because they don't want black people living there. They swear at her, vandalize the car of one of her friends, threaten her, and throw manure at her front door. One night, three young men break in with intentions to burn the house down. Winthrop's ghost intervenes, and hauls the men down to the basement where they are locked in terror until the police arrive.

Later, Atticus discovers that Caleb Braithwhite arranged for the sale of the house to Letitia.

=== Abdullah's Book ===
Caleb Braithwhite blackmails George and Montrose to break into the natural history museum and retrieve a secret book, hidden behind magical incantations set to protect it. They bring along three members of the Prince Hall Freemasons (a lodge George and Montrose belong to) for help: Abdullah Muhammad, Pirate Joe, and Mortimer Dupree. Mortimer nearly dies during the attempt, but the men are able to retrieve the book. Caleb honors his deal with the men. It's the "Book of Names", once owned by Hiram Winthrop. He delivers to them the book he stole from them along with a sizable amount of money.

=== Hippolyta Disturbs the Universe ===
Hippolyta, the wife of Uncle George, is traveling through Wisconsin doing research for their travel guide and stops to explore an astronomical observatory that used to be owned by Hiram Winthrop. She has always dreamed of being an astronomer, even as a child. Using a code that she found in Winthrop's house at a housewarming party thrown by Letitia, she accidentally opens a portal inside the observatory that leads to another planet.

Hippolyta goes through the portal and begins to explore the other planet, finding a woman named Ida living inside a small, gated cottage. Ida was a former maid of Hiram Winthrop's and he brought her and several other employees here years ago after his son eloped with another maid named Pearl. Winthrop meant to scare the employees into telling him where Pearl and his son were but before he could return for them, he was killed by Samuel Braithwhite, and Ida, the last survivor, has been trapped on this other planet for years.

Ida doesn't believe that Winthrop's power was ended by his death and she decides to stay on the planet, giving Hippolyta a box containing a monster inside for her journey back. Ida hopes the monster will kill Hippolyta once she is back on Earth so Ida's location will continue to be a secret. Instead, the monster kills several white men who are hassling Hippolyta as she tries to leave the observatory. When Hippolyta arrives back in Chicago, she realizes a comic book that her son Horace drew for her is not in the car anymore.

=== Jekyll in Hyde Park ===
Ruby (Letitia's sister) is approached by Caleb Braithwhite with a proposal. He needs someone to do odd jobs for him and also keep an eye on The Winthrop House. In return, he will give her a potion that will turn her into a beautiful red-haired white woman for a period of time. Ruby tries this and discovers it is real. She explores parts of Chicago as a white woman with freedom she never would have had as a black woman. She agrees to work for Caleb in this fashion.

One of the jobs he has her do is attend a meeting of representatives of different sorcerer lodges from around the country, in disguise as the red-head (whom Ruby has named Hillary). There Caleb proposes to each lodge that they join forces, form a sort of union between them, to share knowledge and help each other. When asked who would lead this union, he suggests that they all meet back in Chicago in a few months on Midsummer's Day for a contest. Whoever has the strongest alchemy to display to the others, gets the title of their leader.

Later, Ruby discovers that the potion is being made from the blood of a woman in a coma who Caleb keeps nearly frozen in a glass coffin in his basement. Ruby says she wants nothing more to do with him, but cannot bring herself to leave. The story ends with Caleb asking her to be sure of what she wants.

=== The Narrow House ===
Caleb Braithwhite asks Atticus and Montrose to find Henry Winthrop, the son of Hiram Winthrop. Henry took some of his father's books when he ran away, including his notebooks, and Caleb wants them. Atticus and Montrose embark on a journey to Aken, Illinois, where Henry is rumored to be. However, they soon find that since Henry ran off with a black woman who used to work at his father's house, they were both killed by a racist mob. At their house, Montrose meets the ghosts of Henry and his wife's family, who relive the last day of their lives every day (including the murder). Montrose finds Hiram's books, but decides to tell Caleb they found nothing there.

=== Horace and the Devil Doll ===
Cousin Horace makes an appearance in this chapter, after being approached by two detectives and Captain Lancaster. A comic book he drew was found near Hiram Winthrop's observatory, and they demand that Horace ask his mother Hippolyta about it and report back to them. Horace refuses to cooperate, so Lancaster casts a spell to prevent Horace from telling others about the situation, and to cause inanimate objects to move. Soon enough, Horace begins to notice all kinds of cartoons and photographs grinning at him, and a doll attacks him. Horace manages to use Scrabble tiles to spell out to Ruby what happened, and Ruby tells Caleb. Caleb reverses the curses, believing Lancaster thought Caleb ordered Hippolyta to snoop around the observatory. He thinks that Lancaster tried to kill Horace to punish Hippolyta for working with Caleb. Caleb devises a plan to kill Captain Lancaster.

=== The Mark of Cain ===
Everyone gets together to share their stories about Caleb. Caleb has a plan to get rid of Lancaster, but the family decides that they need to get rid of both of them. They decide to pretend to go along with Caleb's plan, but ask Winthrop's ghost for help. Caleb lures Lancaster into a room where a monster swallows him whole, then Atticus uses magic to alter Caleb's Mark of Cain. The mark prevents Caleb from entering certain places and from doing magic. They toss him into their truck, drop him off in Indiana, and drive away.

== Reception ==
Publishers Weekly commended Ruff for his "impressive grasp of classic horror themes", and noted that the book's "most unsettling" aspect is the constant bigotry experienced by the characters, while Kirkus Reviews considered it a "series of bizarre chimerical adventures" and a "merrily macabre pastiche", comparing it favorably to Ruff's previous works.

At Boing Boing, Cory Doctorow described the characters as "active protagonists [with] lives, ... dignity, and ... indomitable spirit", and observed that because of their constant experiences with "harassment, violence, expropriation, and the legacy of slavery", they "don't need Elder Gods to experience horror", while at Tor.com, Alex Brown judged that the book "thoroughly and effectively marries race and horror" and called it "a tense thriller, a terrifying nightmare, a heartbreaking tragedy, and a tale of holding onto aspiration and optimism even while being chased through the woods by a hellbeast from another dimension".

== Adaptation ==
In 2020, HBO released an adaptation of the novel by showrunner, writer and executive producer Misha Green. Jordan Peele and J. J. Abrams also serve as executive producers.
