= Fool on the Hill (novel) =

1988 novel by Matt Ruff

- first US hardcover edition
- Author: Matt Ruff
- Cover artist: original jacket illustration by Andrew Paquette; design by Chip Kidd
- Language: English
- Genre: Fantasy
- Publisher: The Atlantic Monthly Press
- Publication date: 1988
- Publication place: United States
- Media type: Print
- Pages: 396
- ISBN: 0-87113-243-5
- Followed by: Sewer, Gas & Electric

Fool on the Hill is a 1988 comic fantasy novel by American writer Matt Ruff, set at Cornell University in Ithaca, New York.

== Plot summary ==
The novel follows the events unfolding at Ithaca College, New York, which are influenced and partially set in motion by a supernatural storyteller (heavily implied to be a Greek deity, likely Apollo) called Mr. Sunshine, who is looking to weave reality into a tale.

The story is told from the perspective of characters belonging to three different groups:

The humans, first and foremost the successful young author Stephen Titus George, who later on starts becoming aware of Mr. Sunshine's influence on reality and his life, including a short romance with Calliope (the world's most beautiful woman) and later, him being made to fall in love with Aurora Borealis Smith, a college student with fantastical dreams. Aside from him, there are also the Bohemians, a nonconformist students association at Cornell University, notably Ragnarok (aka Charles Hyatt) who ends up fighting against Jack Barron, head of the racist Rho Alpha Tau fraternity.

The Sprites, who inhabit the campus while remaining invisible to humans and who become engaged in a war against an evil entity with magical powers called Rasferret the Grub and his army of humanoid rats.

The animals, notably a religious mutt named Luther and his atheist cat friend named Blackjack, who are pulled into tensions between purebred dogs and mutt dogs and are pursued by Draco, an Irish Wolfhound who is bigoted against mutts.

As the story progresses, the lines between these worlds start blurring as Mr. Sunshine frees Rasferret specifically to be George's enemy. This allows for the use of Rasferret's ability to magically animate inanimate objects in attacks against humans, first by sending a rubber sex doll on a homicidal rampage, and in the end by bringing an enormous papier mâché dragon to life to do battle with George.
