= Matt Ruff =

American author

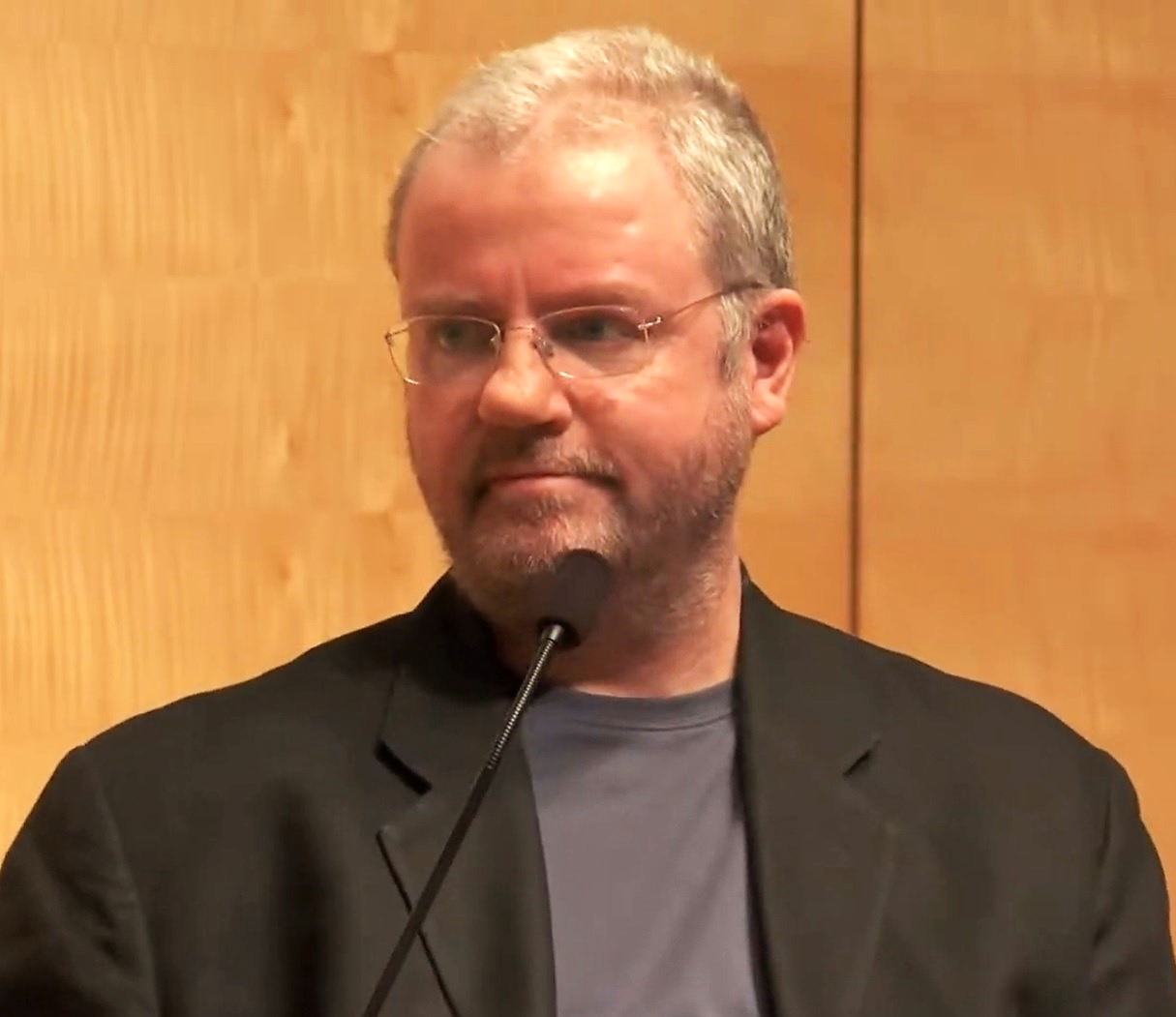
- Ruff in 2018
- Born: September 8, 1965 (age 61); Queens, New York City, U.S.
- Education: Cornell University
- Notable work: The Mirage, Lovecraft Country
- Spouse: Lisa Gold (m. 1998)
- Website: www.bymattruff.com

Matthew Theron Ruff (born September 8, 1965) is an American author of thriller, science fiction and comic novels, including The Mirage and Lovecraft Country, the latter having been adapted in 2020 by HBO into a TV series.

== Early life and education ==
Ruff was born in Brooklyn, New York City, in 1965, to a Lutheran family of German ancestry. His father was a hospital chaplain, and his maternal grandfather was a missionary. At the age of 5, he decided he wanted to be a fiction writer. He spent his childhood and adolescence learning how to tell stories. In elementary school, he wrote a number of short stories, many of them starring his classmates in scenarios cribbed from movies or TV. Ruff has said that reading these aloud in English class was his first experience performing in front of an audience and his first solid evidence that he had what it took to entertain people with his storytelling.

Many adults around him attempted to persuade him to choose a different career, but Ruff's mother was supportive of his hope to become a writer; for one of Ruff's birthdays, she bought him an IBM Selectric typewriter. From third to eighth grade, Ruff attended a parochial school. He attended Stuyvesant High School in Manhattan. One of his teachers there was the memoirist Frank McCourt.

Ruff's first sustained effort at a novel was a soap opera–like story about a family with a lot of children (having only older half siblings, Ruff was fascinated by the concept of siblings). He wrote it in the 1970s, but never published it. Describing it, Ruff said "Think Eight Is Enough with surreal elements. There was no overall plot, just a series of loosely linked episodes—a chapter about the boys and girls digging competing tunnel systems under the house would be followed by one in which they got infected by some weird flu strain and started passing out in the halls. Periodically I’d set aside what I’d written and start the whole thing over again".

During Ruff's last semester at Cornell University, his mother died. He graduated in 1987. One of Ruff's English professors had been Alison Lurie, who helped Ruff find an agent.

His father died after Ruff's first novel was published.

== Published works ==
Ruff's first novel, Fool on the Hill, is a fantasy that drew on his experiences living in Risley Residential College at Cornell. It was first written as his senior thesis in Honors English. It was published shortly after Ruff graduated from the university.

His second book, Sewer, Gas & Electric: The Public Works Trilogy, is postcyberpunk.

His third book, Set This House in Order: A Romance of Souls, focuses on two protagonists displaying a fictionalized version of dissociative identity disorder; while not technically science fiction, it nonetheless contains significant speculative elements.

- Fool on the Hill (1988) – (ISBN 0-8021-3535-8)
- Sewer, Gas & Electric: The Public Works Trilogy (1997) – (ISBN 0-87113-641-4)
- Set This House in Order: A Romance of Souls (2003) – (ISBN 0-06-095485-X)
- Bad Monkeys (2007) – (ISBN 0061240419)
- The Mirage (2012) – (ISBN 9780061976223; ISBN 0-06-197622-9)
- Lovecraft Country (2016) – (ISBN 978-0062292063; ISBN 0062292064)
- 88 Names (2020) – (ISBN 978-0062854674; ISBN 0062854674)
- The Destroyer of Worlds: A Return to Lovecraft Country (2023) – (ISBN 9780063256897)

== Awards ==
Set This House in Order was long-listed for the 2005 International Dublin Literary Award and won the 2007 James Tiptree, Jr. Award, a PNBA Book Award, and a Washington State Book Award. Ruff is also the recipient of a 2006 National Endowment for the Arts Literature Fellowship in Prose

Bad Monkeys received the 2008 Washington State Book Award for Fiction, a PNBA Book Award, and an Alex Award.

The Mirage was nominated for the Sidewise Award for Alternate History.

Lovecraft Country was nominated for the World Fantasy Award in 2017 in the Novel category.
