= Dewey Arch =

Triumphal arch in Manhattan, New York

Dewey Triumphal Arch and Colonnade
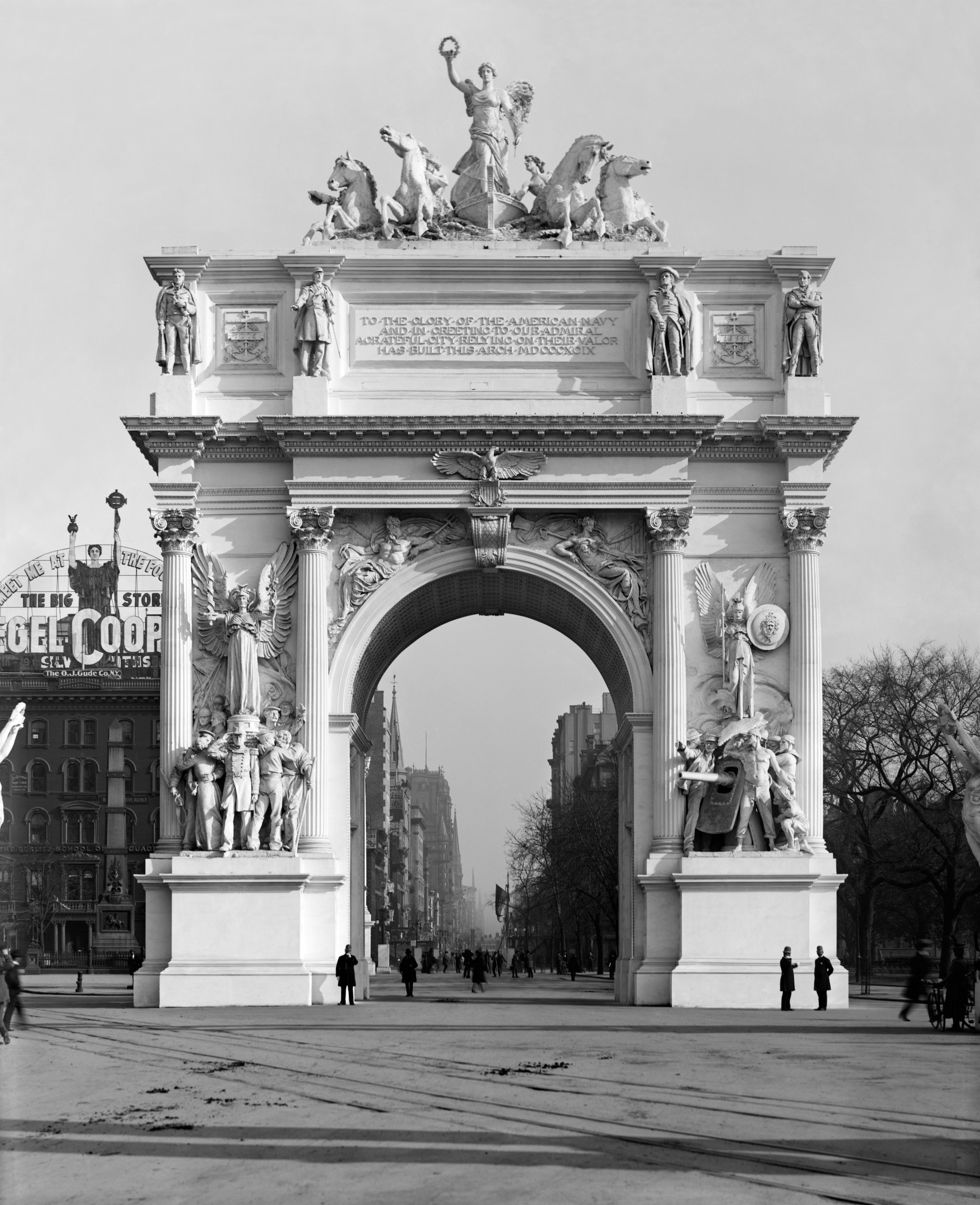
- (1900)
- Interactive map of Dewey Triumphal Arch and Colonnade
- Location: Manhattan, New York
- Coordinates: 40°44′33″N 73°59′20″W
- Designer: Charles R. Lamb
- Type: Triumphal arch
- Material: Staff
- Length: 70 ft (21 m)
- Width: 30 ft (9.1 m)
- Height: 85 ft (26 m)
- Opening date: September 1899
- Dedicated to: George Dewey
- Dismantled date: 1900
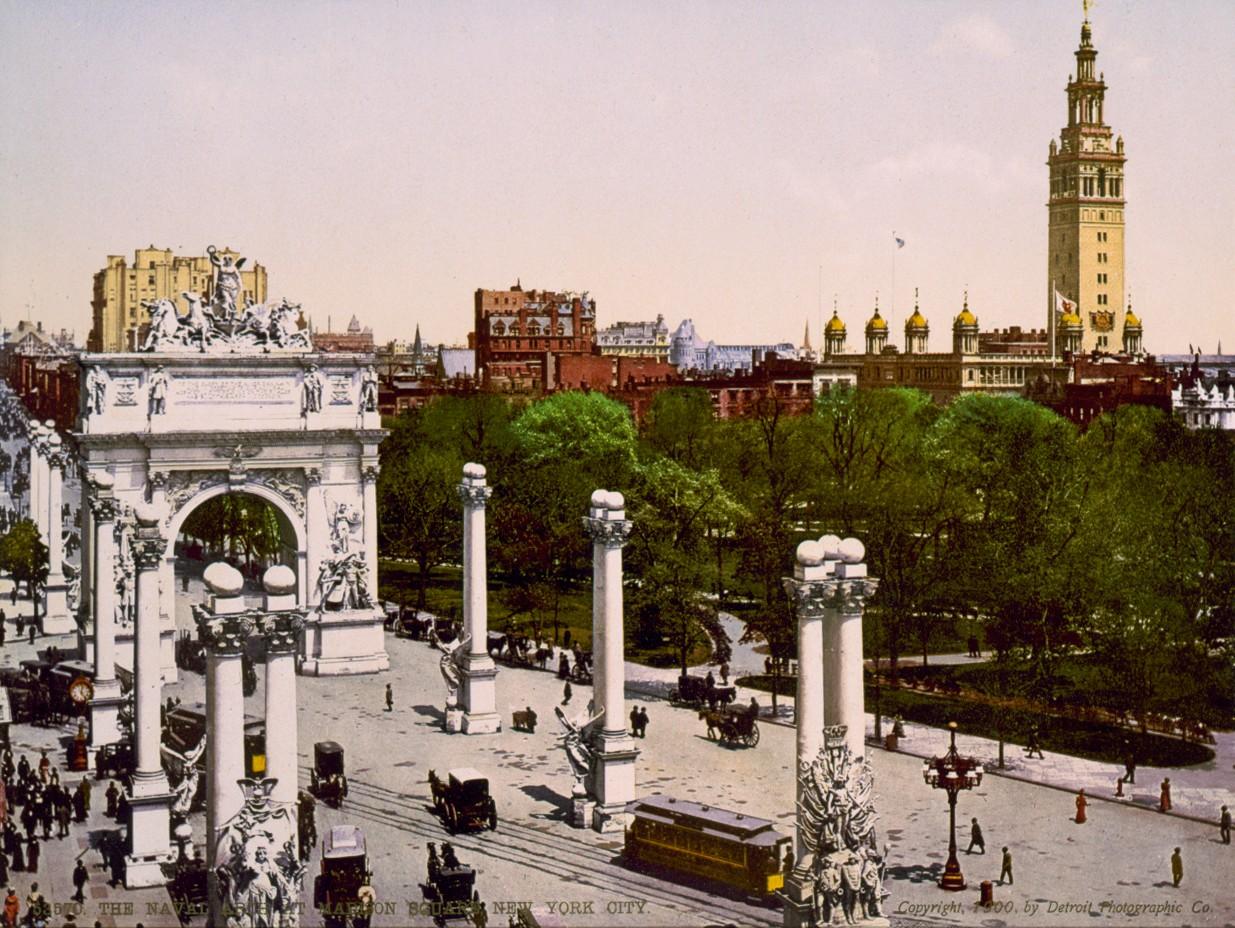

External videos
- The Dewey Arch, American Mutoscope and Biograph Co., 1899. Available through the National Screening Room at the Library of Congress.

The Dewey Arch was a triumphal arch that stood from 1899 to 1900 at Madison Square in Manhattan, New York City, United States. It was erected for a parade in honor of Admiral George Dewey celebrating his victory at the Battle of Manila Bay in the Philippines in 1898.

== History ==
Planning for the parade, scheduled for September 1899, began early that year. The architect Charles R. Lamb built support for a triumphal arch among his fellow members of the National Sculpture Society. A committee of society members, including Lamb, Karl Bitter, Frederick W. Ruckstull, John Quincy Adams Ward and John De Witt Warner, submitted a proposal for an arch to the City of New York, which approved the plan in July 1899.

With only two months remaining before the parade, the committee decided to build the arch and its colonnade out of staff, a plaster-based material used previously for temporary buildings at several World's Fairs. Modeled after the Arch of Titus in Rome, the Dewey Arch was decorated with the works of twenty-eight sculptors and topped by a large quadriga (modeled by Ward) depicting four horses drawing a ship. The arch was illuminated at night with electric light bulbs.

After the parade on September 30, 1899, the arch began to deteriorate. An attempt to raise money to rebuild it in stone (as had been done for the arch in Washington Square Park) failed, owing to the growing unpopularity of the Philippine War. The arch was demolished in 1900, and the larger sculptures sent to Charleston, South Carolina, for an exhibit, after which they were either destroyed or lost.

== See also ==
- The separate Victory Arch which was built in the same place in 1918 and torn down 1920. As of 2024 there is no arch in Madison Square Park.
