= Church of the Saviour (Syracuse, New York) =

Chapel in New York, United States

Coordinates: 43°3′11.6″N 76°8′51.1″W

The Church of the Saviour (Syracuse) is a chapel in the Episcopal Diocese of Central New York. It is an Anglo-Catholic Episcopal parish noteworthy for its historically significant architecture and decor, which took shape in the late nineteenth and early twentieth centuries. The church reported 88 members in 2020 and 97 members in 2023; no membership statistics were reported in 2024 parochial reports. Plate and pledge income reported for the congregation in 2024 was $37,020 with average Sunday attendance (ASA) of 31 persons.

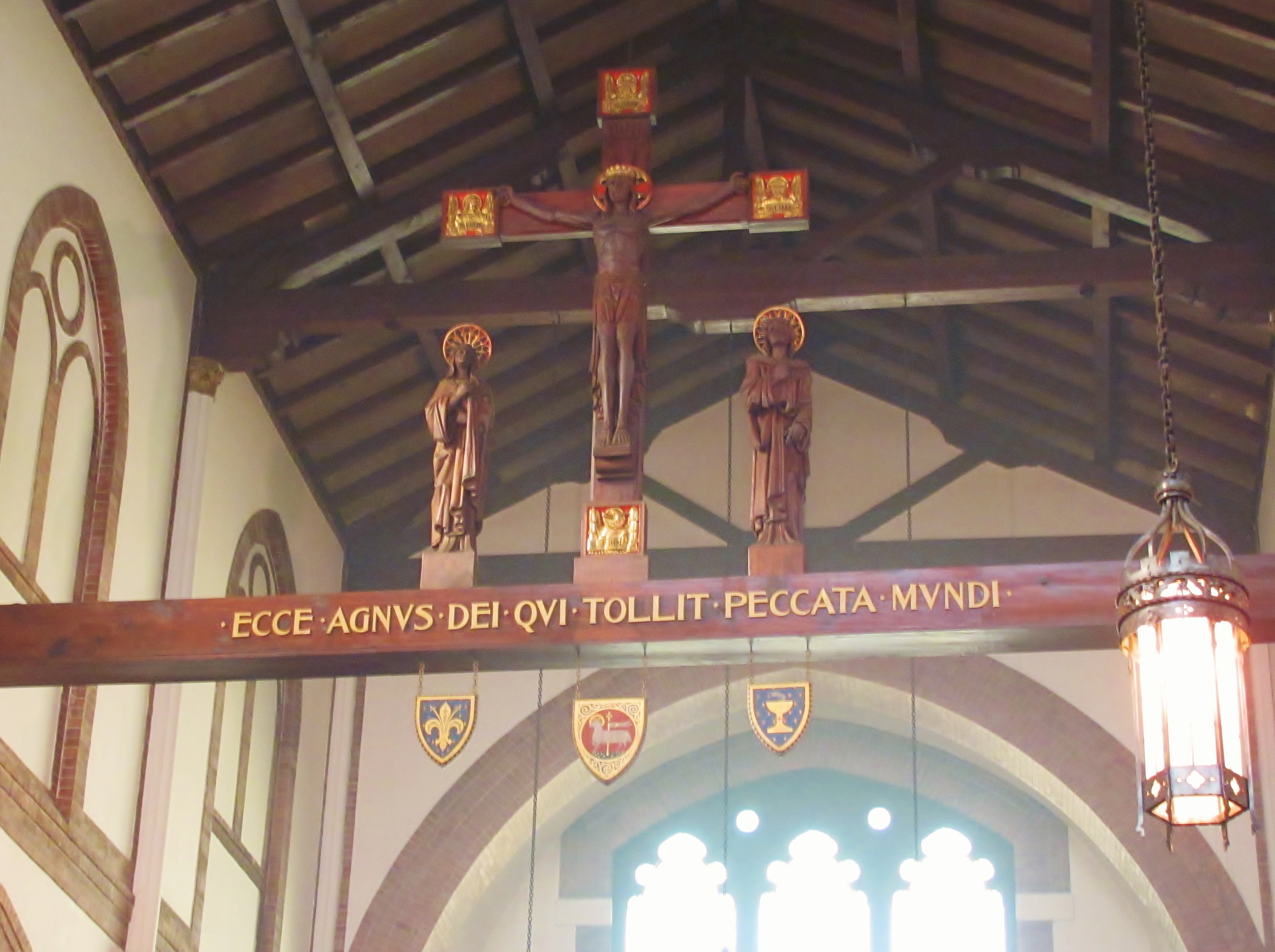
Kirchmayer's rood beam, 1913

The Church of the Saviour was first organized in Syracuse, New York, in 1848 as St. James Church. It was only the second church established in the state of New York to have entirely free pews. After a series of fires, the building was replaced in 1891 with one designed by Syracuse architect Asa L. Merrick. Seven years later, after a bankruptcy auction, the parish was reorganized as the Church of the Saviour. Finally, after another fire in 1912, the building interior was redesigned by the firm of Ralph Adams Cram, one the country's leading exponents of Gothic Revival architecture and proponent of Anglo-Catholic worship.

The interior of the Church of the Saviour features a rood beam carved in 1913 by Johannes Kirchmayer of Boston; an altar of Caen stone and Carrara marble, by the firm of J. and R. Lamb, dedicated in 1915; and a 2,000-pipe organ built by the M. P. Möller Company in 1962. The organ was built according to an unusual design created by the musicologist Ernest F. White, the Möller Company's tonal director, who also served as the Church of the Saviour's organist and musical director in 1962–1963. The building also contains a lady chapel and a wooden columbarium.

Sunday Eucharistic services at the Church of the Saviour are conducted according to Rite I of the Book of Common Prayer, similar to the form of the liturgy used in Episcopal churches in the United States before 1979.
