= J&R Lamb Studios =

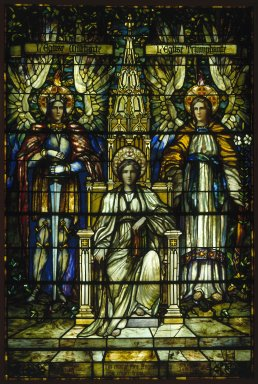
Frederick Stymetz Lamb. Religion Enthroned, Brooklyn Museum. Gift of Irving T. Bush in memory of his father and mother, 29.1082. Creative Commons-BY-NC.

J&R Lamb Studios, America's oldest continuously-run decorative arts company, is famous as a stained glass maker, preceding the studios of both John LaFarge and Louis C. Tiffany.

== History ==
The J&R Lamb Studios was established in 1857 by brothers Joseph (1833–1898) and Richard Lamb (1836–1909) in Greenwich Village in New York City. Their parents, Joseph Lamb (1806-1840) and Elizabeth Clark (1809-1838) were married on October 1, 1832, in Orpington, Kent, England. Elizabeth Clark Lamb died on April 7, 1838, during a difficult childbirth in which the infant was stillborn. The young brothers left Lewisham, England, at some point in 1840 to come to the United States with their father, a landscape architect, who had been engaged to work on Niblo's Garden, an exhibition hall and open-air theater. During the voyage, their father died, and a sympathetic Scottish couple, Peter Rennie (1805-1870) and Agnes Rennie (1809-1894), who were also making the journey to America, took on the responsibility of caring for these two young boys and became their foster parents. The boys grew up in the Rennie home at Dobbs Ferry, New York. As a young man in the early 1850s, Joseph was active in literary and poetic circles in New York City and was a member of the Irving Literary Union, founded in New York City in 1852 in honor of the great author, Washington Irving (1783-1859). Joseph was enthusiastic about the Gothic Revival movement. That enthusiasm may have come about as the result of exposure to the efforts and literature of the New York Ecclesiological Society. For a time, Joseph Lamb considered entering the ministry or becoming a church musician. However, as his talent lay elsewhere, he decided it was better "to make the art of the church his life's work."

Originally, the company also did mosaic, murals, monuments, and other work for churches, temples, residences, government and academic institutions.

The firm was chosen by the United States government as one of four studios to represent American achievements in stained glass at the Paris International Exposition of 1900. They won two prizes for their window entitled Religion Enthroned designed by Frederick Stymetz Lamb (1862–1928), the third of Joseph's sons. Frederick's brother, Charles Rollinson Lamb (1860-1942), a renowned City Beautiful theorist and architect, shaped the studio's aesthetic and intellectual character and business. Frederick became its head of design and supervised the firm's team of skilled craftsman. In the early 1920s Frederick and his wife Nellie moved to Berkeley, California where he supervised local civic projects and frequently exhibited his landscapes in oil to great acclaim at the art colonies in Berkeley and Carmel-by-the-Sea, California.

Ella Condie Lamb, the wife of Charles Rollinson Lamb, was a well known artist and stained glass designer, also winning a medal in the World's Columbian Exposition in Chicago in 1893 for her oil work, "The Advent Angel".

Studio owner and family member, Karl Barre Lamb (1890–1969), was president of the Stained Glass Association of America 1954–1955 and an elected fellow. Lamb descendants ran the studios until his death. Under Karl B. Lamb's leadership, the studios relocated to Tenafly, New Jersey after the Great Depression.

In 1970, Lamb Studios artist Donald Samick bought the firm.

With the death of the stained glass artist Katharine Lamb Tait (1895–1981), the daughter of Charles Rollinson Lamb, the Lamb family was no longer involved with the studio.

The Library of Congress is the repository for the Lamb Studios Archive.

== Studio location history ==
Cf. Lamb Studios Archive: Background, Library of Congress

- New York City (1857–1934)
- Tenafly, New Jersey (1934–1970)
- Northvale, New Jersey (1970–1979)
- Philmont, New York (1980–1997)
- Ridgewood, New Jersey (1998–2001)
- Clifton, New Jersey (2002–2007)
- Midland Park, New Jersey (2008–)

== Selected works ==
=== Glass ===
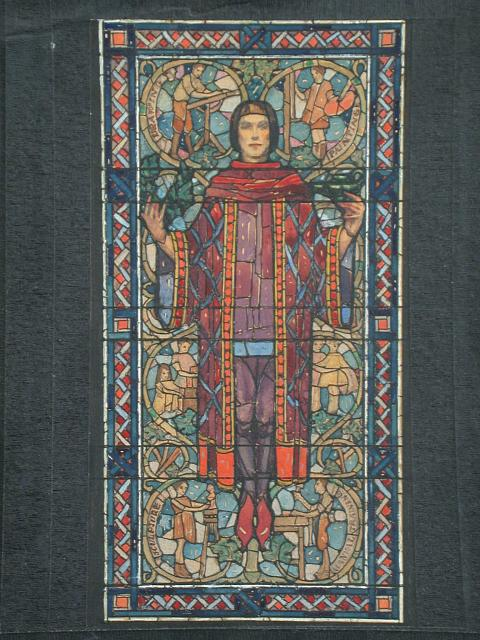
Design drawing c.1927 by Katharine Lamb Tait, J&R Lamb Studios, for a stained glass window called Arts Education, Froelich Memorial Window in the Newark Museum

- Caroline Felthousen Dudley Pratt Memorial Window, Grace and Holy Trinity Cathedral, Kansas City, Missouri, 1903
- Main Protestant Chapel at Camp Lejuene (stained glass) 10 stained glass windows designed by artist Katharine Lamb Tait and installed in 1948
- Church of the Ascension (New York) (choir stalls)
- Church of the Saviour (Syracuse) (altar)
- Roswell P. Flower Memorial Library, Watertown, New York. Charles Rollinson Lamb, artist-architect; interior decoration by J&R Lamb Studios.
- Hugo B. Froehlich Memorial Art Education Window, donated in 1927 by the Manual Training Teachers of Newark to the Newark Museum. Designed by Katharine Lamb Tait.
- Plymouth Congregational Church (later Plymouth Church of the Pilgrims), Brooklyn Heights, Brooklyn, New York.
- St. Paul Episcopal Cathedral, Buffalo, New York - Installed in 1961-1962 stained glass windows with depictions of the Saints designed by Katharine Lamb Tait of J&R Lamb Studios, Tenafly, NJ.
- Stanford Memorial Church, Stanford University. Stained glass designed by Frederick Stymetz Lamb.
- Tuskegee University Chapel, Tuskegee University, Tuskegee, Alabama. The chapel windows, known as the "Singing Windows," designed by J&R Lamb of New York and installed in the 1932 chapel renovation, portrayed eleven beloved Negro spirituals.
- Andrae Memorial Window, St. Mary's-in-Tuxedo Episcopal Church, Tuxedo Park, New York.

=== Stone ===
- Sage Chapel at Cornell University (mosaic)
- Chapel of the Holy Spirit, St. Mary's-in-Tuxedo Episcopal Church, Tuxedo Park, New York. Designed by George de Ris of J&R Lamb.
- The monument to Rev. John Boyd; first ordained Presbyterian minister in the Americas in 1685. The monument is located in the Old Scots Burying Ground. Designed and constructed by J&R Lamb of New York for the Synod of the Northeast. The monument was constructed with three different sourced granite stone (Ireland, Scotland, and Vermont) in 1898. The burial ground is located in Marlboro Township, New Jersey.
