= Sage Chapel =

Chapel at Cornell University

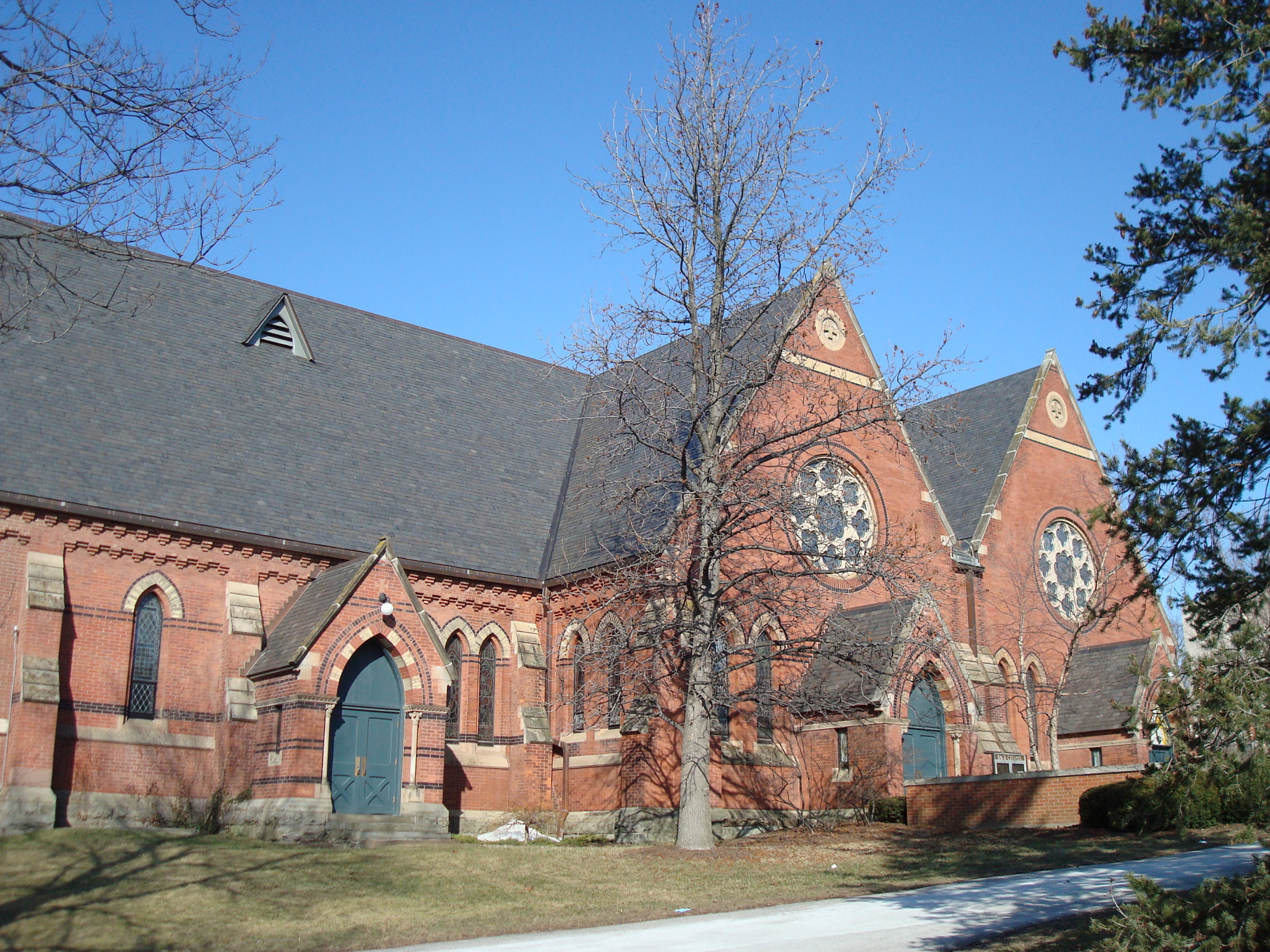
- Sage Chapel
- Sage Chapel
- 42.447211°N 76.484452°W
- Location: Cornell University, Ithaca, New York
- Country: United States
- Denomination: Non-denominational

Architecture
- Functional status: Active
- Architect: Charles Babcock
- Years built: 1872–1875

Sage Chapel is the non-denominational chapel on the campus of Cornell University in Ithaca, New York, United States. It serves as the burial ground for many contributors to Cornell's history, including the founders of the university: Ezra Cornell and Andrew Dickson White as well as their wives. The building was gifted to the university by Henry William Sage and his wife. The chapel opened in 1875 and is located on Ho Plaza, across from Willard Straight Hall and next to John M. Olin Library, John McGraw Tower, and Barnes Hall.

== Design ==
=== Exterior ===
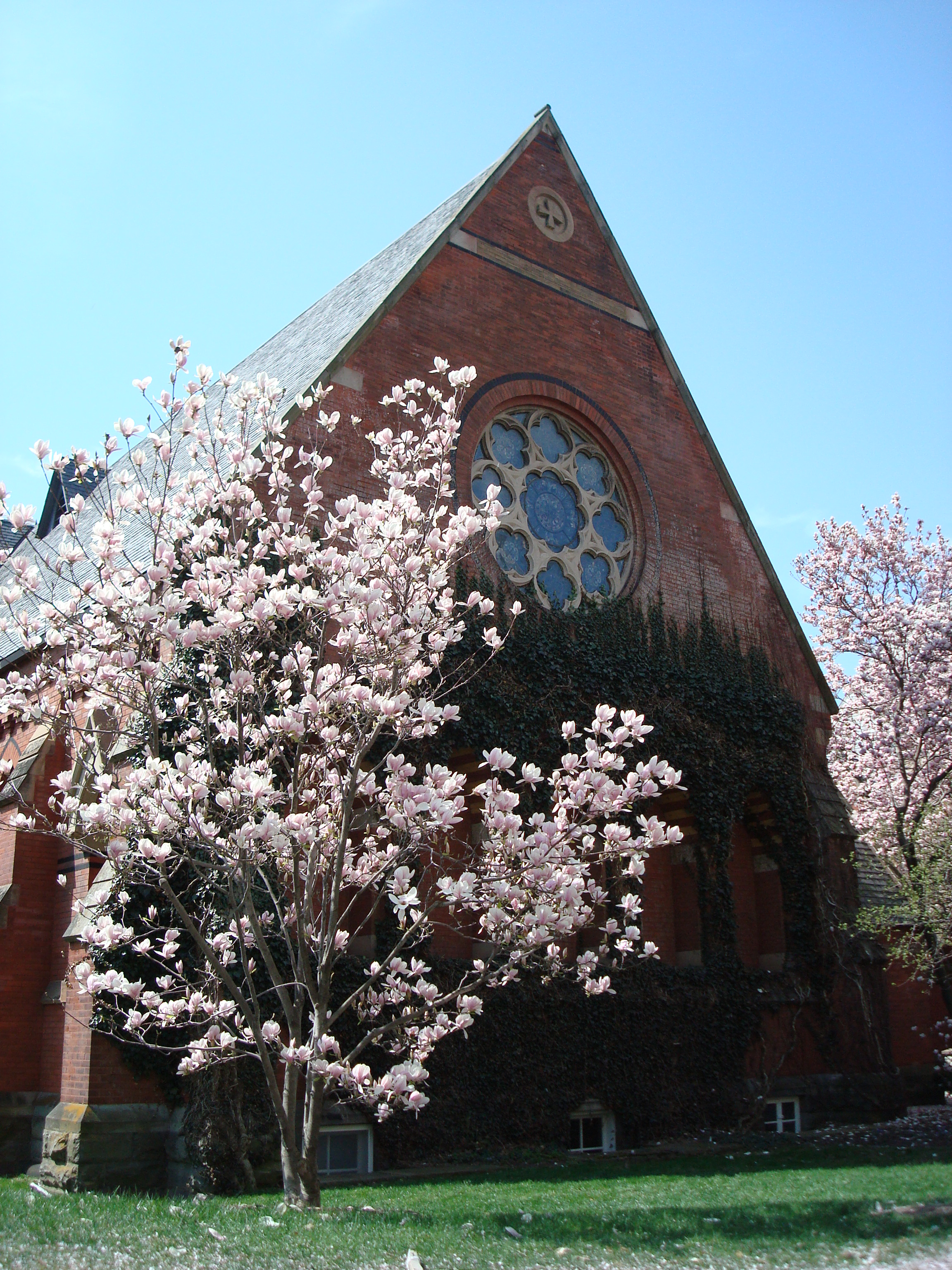
Part of the northern face of Sage Chapel during springtime

Sage Chapel is named after Henry Sage, a trustee of the university. It was designed in 1872 by the Reverend Charles Babcock, the first Professor of Architecture at Cornell University, with stonework provided by local stone-carver Robert Richardson.

The design has been significantly altered over the years. The original design featured a 75-foot (23 m) tower with spire and belfry. An apse was added in 1898 for the bodies of Henry Williams Sage and his wife. The mosaic decoration of the apse was designed by artist Ella Condie Lamb. It was then created by J&R Lamb Studios of New York; preliminary designs for this work can be found in the Lamb Studios Archive in the Library of Congress. A north transept was added in 1903. In 1940–41, a west wing expansion and renovation added more space for a new choir loft and the current pipe organ, a 3-manual Aeolian-Skinner with 69 stops and an estimated 3,858 speaking pipes. The organ incorporates several ranks of pipes from previous instruments, including two of the previous organs built in the chapel. The building includes Tiffany glass windows and a stained glass memorial to three civil rights workers (one of whom was a Cornell alumnus, Michael Schwerner), murdered during Freedom Summer.

=== Interior ===
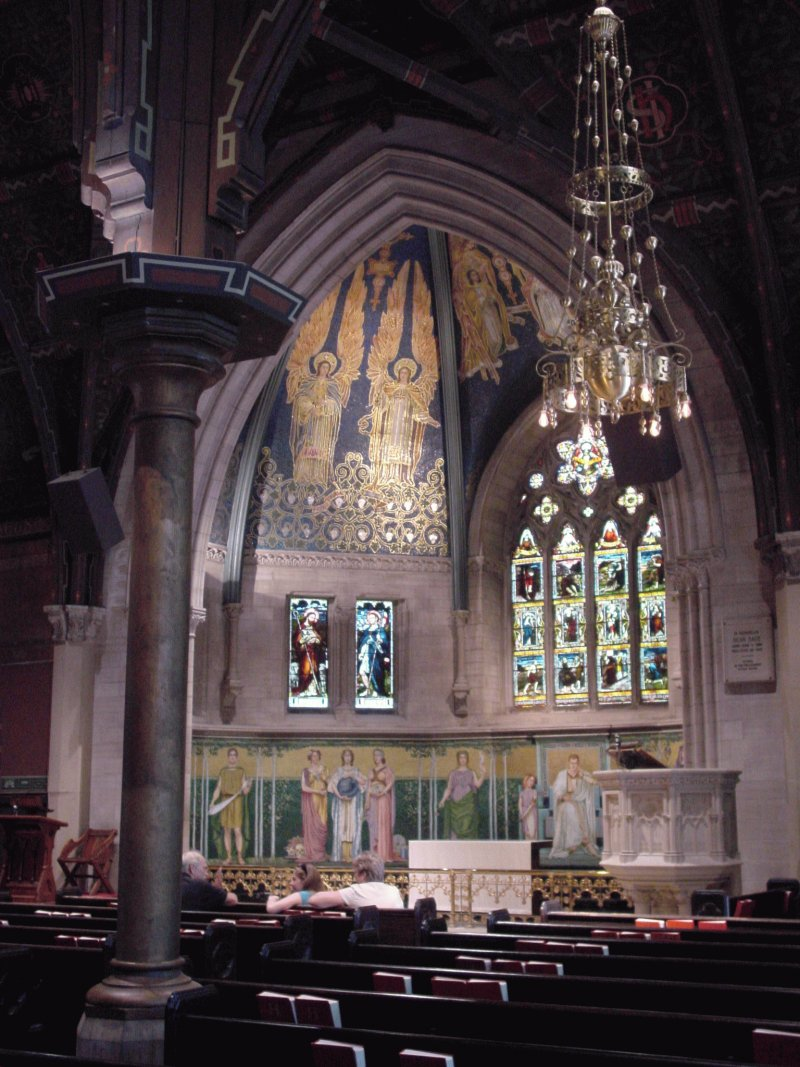
The altar and apse of Sage Chapel

The interior building has a long history with many of the artistic renderings representing many Christian and educational themes.

Behind the church's main altar is a figure named Philosophia. This artwork is surrounded by images of women representing other academic subjects, including mathematics, chemistry, theater, literature and music. The secular artwork led to Cornell having the nickname 'the heathens on the hill'.

The double crosses in the ceiling have a blue background in which are set gilded sunbursts and stars, while in the centers are found the Greek letters, XP, which began the word Christos, and the Alpha and Omega. The colors also are symbolic; white is for purity, innocence, and faith. Black and white together, purity of life, and humiliation. Red is for fire, heat, and the creative power. Red and black together, purgatory and the realm of Satan. Green is for hope, of victory and immortality. Gray is for mourning and innocent accused. Blue for the firmament, truth, and constancy. Gold is the sun and goodness of God. The anchor represents hope and patience. The lamp is piety and wisdom. The lamb and pennant, represent the Redeemer. The cross is for redemption. The interwoven triangles, represents the Trinity. The Lion is for the Tribe of Judah. The open book with a hand pointing to the Beatitudes, is a symbol of the Gospels. The sword and palm is for martyrdom and victory. The chalice is for faith. The flaming heart is of fervent piety and love. The standard, the wreath, and the crown represent victory over evil. The sun, stars, and crescent moon, are the luminous nebula which emanates from and surrounds the Divine Essence. The burning bush symbolizes the fervor of the martyrs.

I.H.S. was originally the first three letters of the name of Jesus in Greek; in Renaissance times they were said to stand for Jesus Hominum Salvator, "Jesus, Savior of men."

Many of the decorative carvings of Sage Chapel were executed by Robert Richardson, a stone-carver who had emigrated to Ithaca from England. Commenting on Richardson's work in Sage Chapel, Andrew Dickson White wrote:

Best of all was [Richardson's] work in the chapel. The tracery of the windows, the capitals of the columns, and the corbels supporting the beams of the roof were masterpieces; and, in my opinion, no investment of equal amount has proved to be of more value to us ... than these examples of a conscientious devotion of genius and talent which he thus gave us. ... The stone vaulting, the tracery, and other decorative work ... carried out as a labor of love by Richardson, were all that I could desire.

— Andrew Dickson White, Autobiography Volume 1 (1906)

== History ==
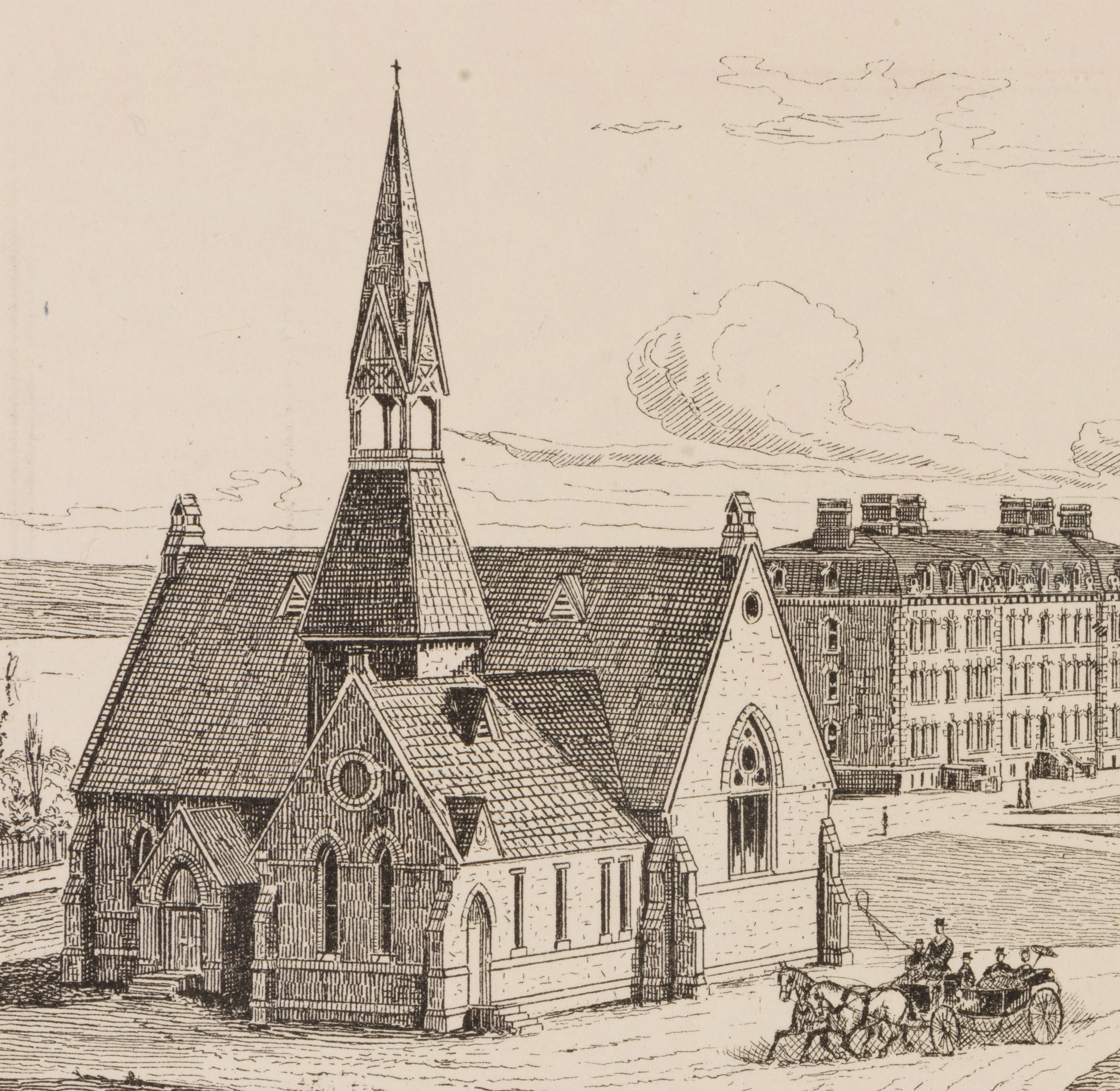
Sage Chapel in 1874; note the tower and spire.

Cornell University was founded as a non-sectarian institution; this drew criticism of "godlessness" from some quarters. In response, Henry W. Sage, sometimes called the "second founder of the University", donated funds for the establishment of a chapel. Sage stipulated two conditions for the gift: first, that the chapel "would never be delivered over to one sect," and that "students should be attracted but not coerced into it." Henry Sage's son Dean Sage later endowed the position of chaplain.

Opening services were held on June 13, 1875, with Reverend Phillips Brooks of Boston's Trinity Church presiding.

Sage Chapel originally featured a 75-foot (23 m) tower with spire and belfry. In 1875, the tower held one of two electric arc lamps installed on campus by professor of physics William Arnold Anthony. It was said to be the "first locality in America, if not the world, to have a permanent installation of electric arc lamps." The lamps were "visible for many miles around, and it excited the wonder of the inhabitants."

Sage Chapel has hosted many speakers, including Lyman Beecher, John R. Mott (Cornell class of 1888), Mordecai Wyatt Johnson, Harry Emerson Fosdick, Stephen Samuel Wise, Martin Luther King Sr., Martin Luther King Jr., Reinhold Niebuhr, Paul Tillich, Elie Wiesel, Abraham Heschel, Hans Küng, Harold Kushner, Elisabeth Kübler-Ross, Carl Sagan, Jane Goodall, Arianna Huffington, and Peter Gomes. Other speakers have included Lyman Abbott, Daniel Berrigan, and John Cleese.

Father Robert S. Smith, Catholic priest, author, and educator, preached regularly at Sage Chapel from 2002 to 2010 while he served as a chaplain at Cornell.

Sage Chapel Christmas Vespers is an annual tradition at Cornell. For many years, Professor Morris Bishop delivered the readings.

Sage Chapel serves as the home of the Cornell University Glee Club and Cornell University Chorus, and for a number of years the Sage Chapel Choir.

== Interments ==
The bodies or ashes of numerous Cornell notables and their families are interred in the crypt inside Sage Chapel. They include:

- Ezra Cornell and his wife, Mary Ann Wood Cornell
- Andrew Dickson White and his first wife, Mary Outwater White
- Two infant children of Andrew Dickson White by his second wife Helen Magill White
- Henry W. Sage and his wife Susan Linn Sage
- John McGraw, benefactor and trustee
- Cornell Librarian Willard Fiske and his wife Jennie McGraw Fiske
- Alonzo B. Cornell, Governor of New York and eldest son of founder Ezra Cornell, and his first wife Elen Augusta Cornell
- Edmund Ezra Day, Cornell's fifth president, and his wife
- Deane Waldo Malott, Cornell's sixth president

== Gallery ==
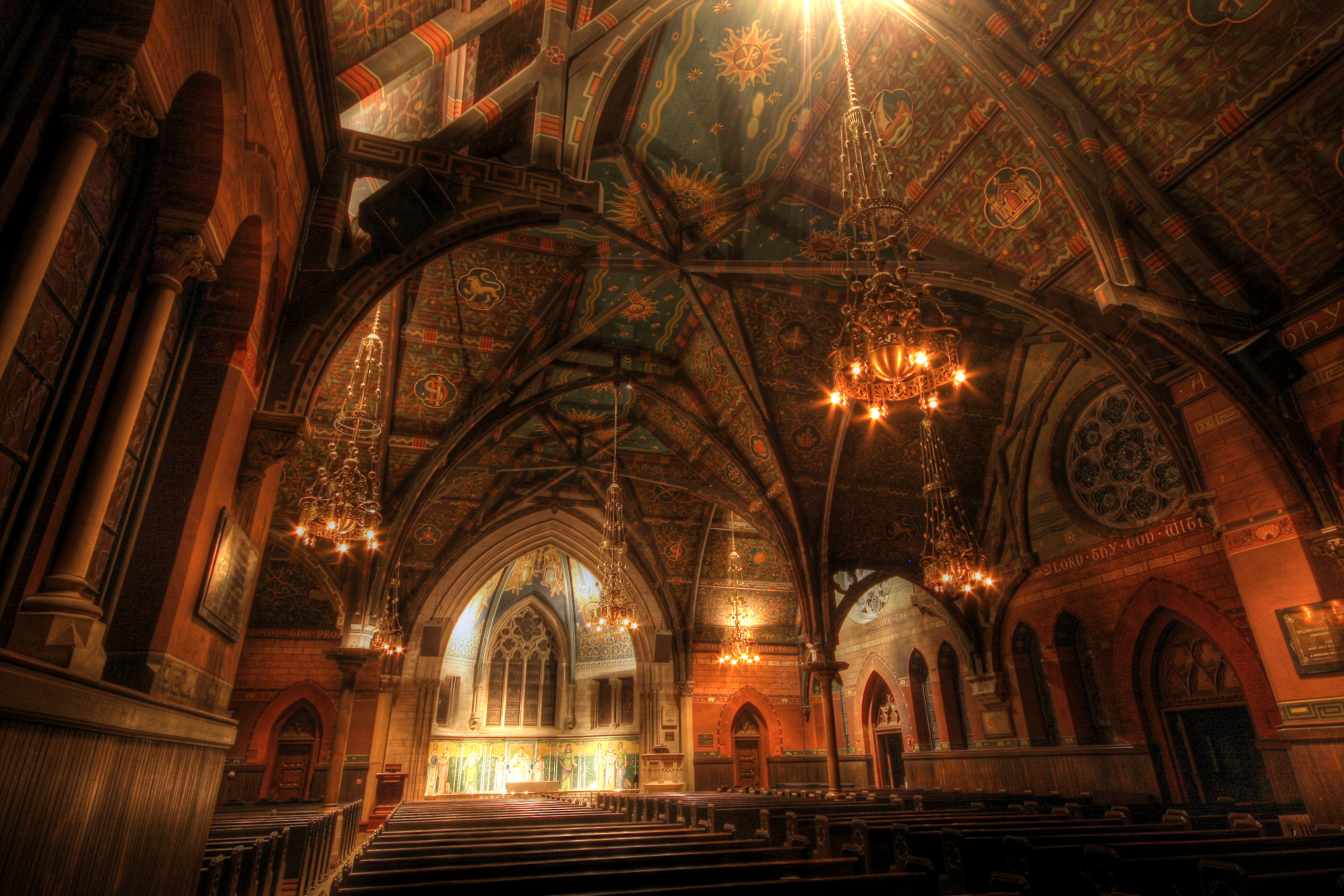
The interior of Sage Chapel.

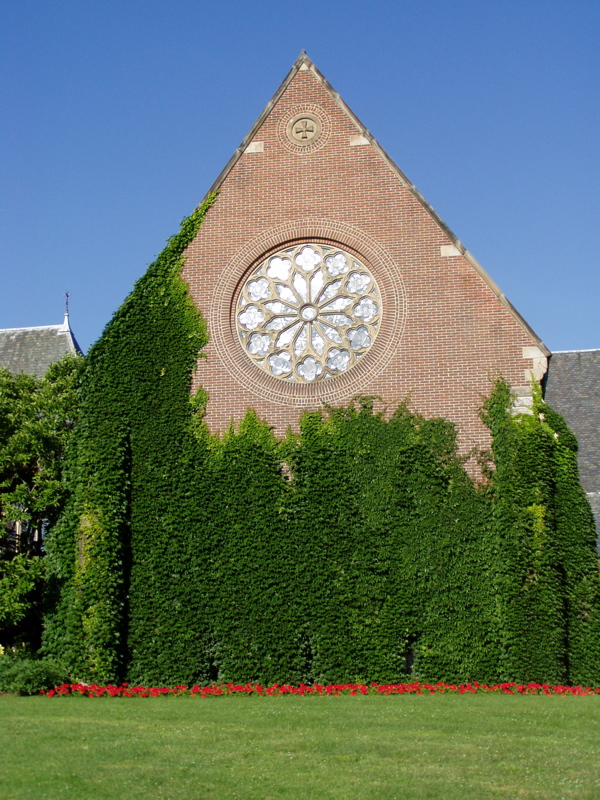
West elevation.

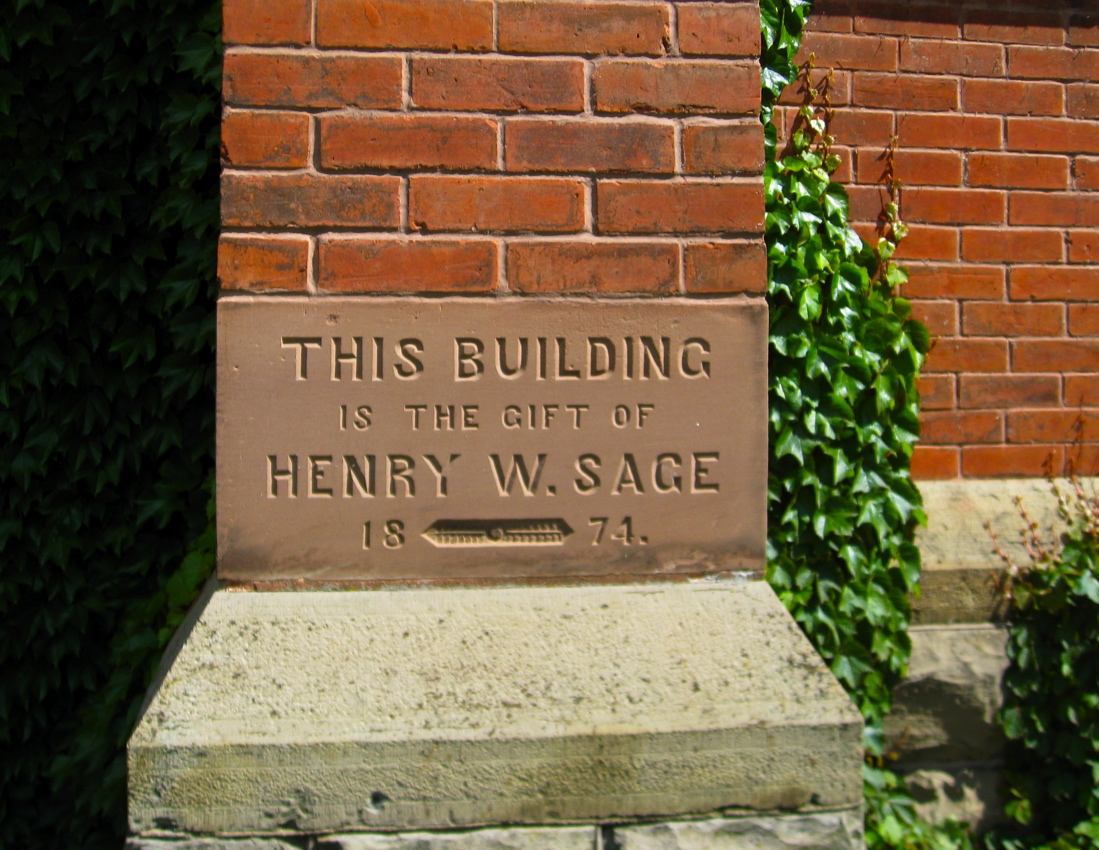
Cornerstone on the South elevation.

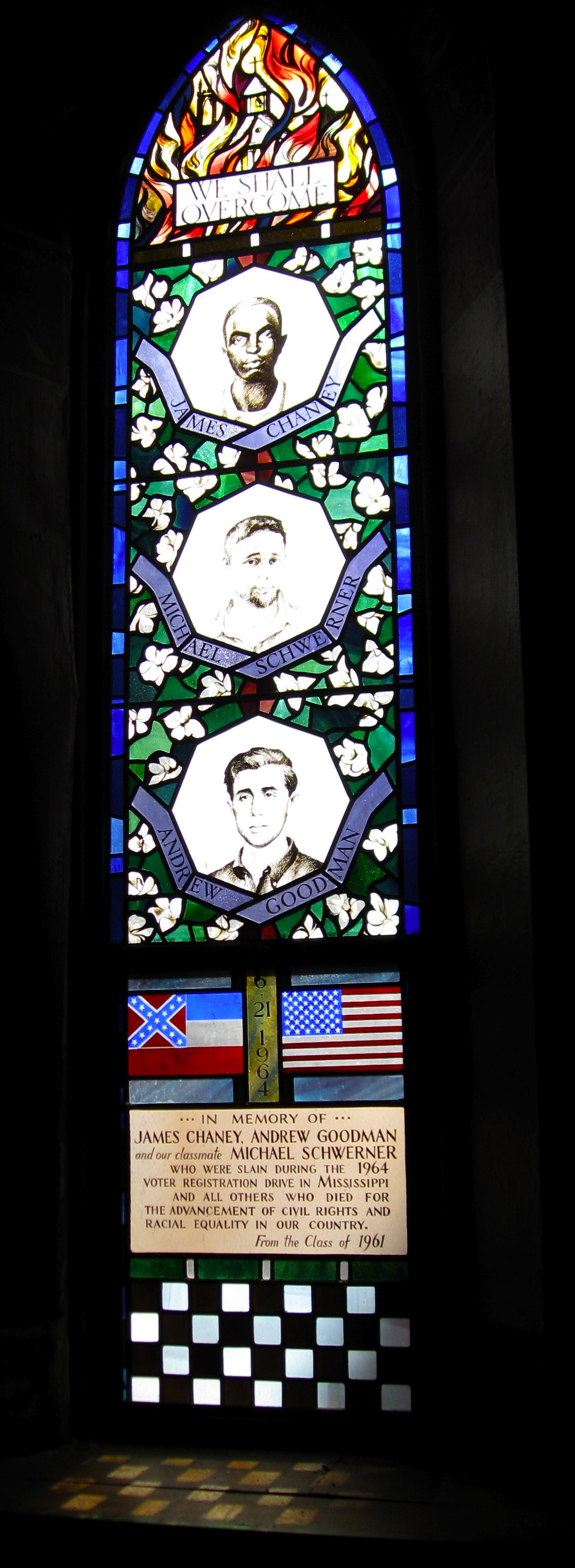
Stained glass window honoring James Chaney, Michael Schwerner, and Andrew Goodman.

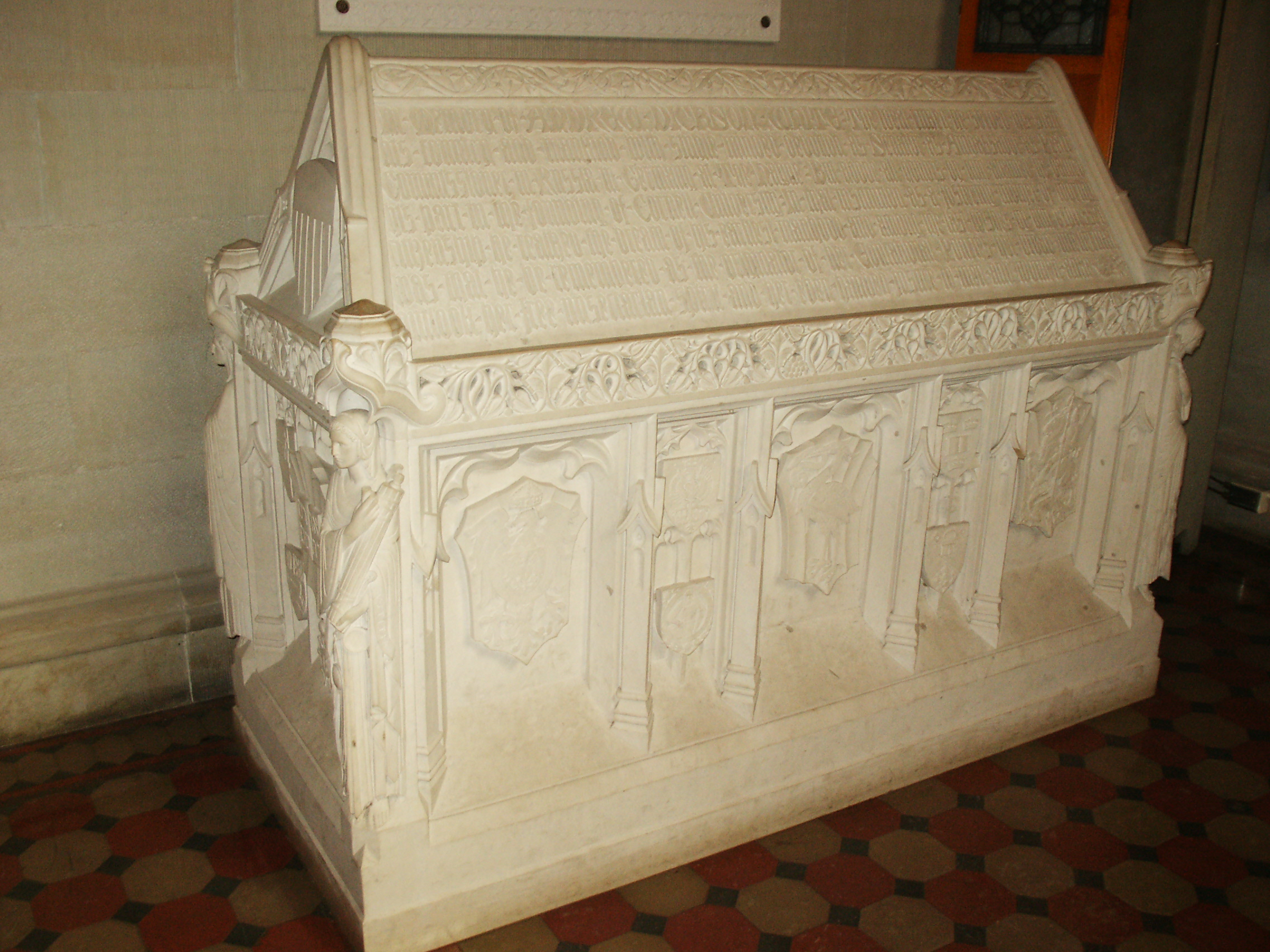
Andrew Dickson White's sarcophagus

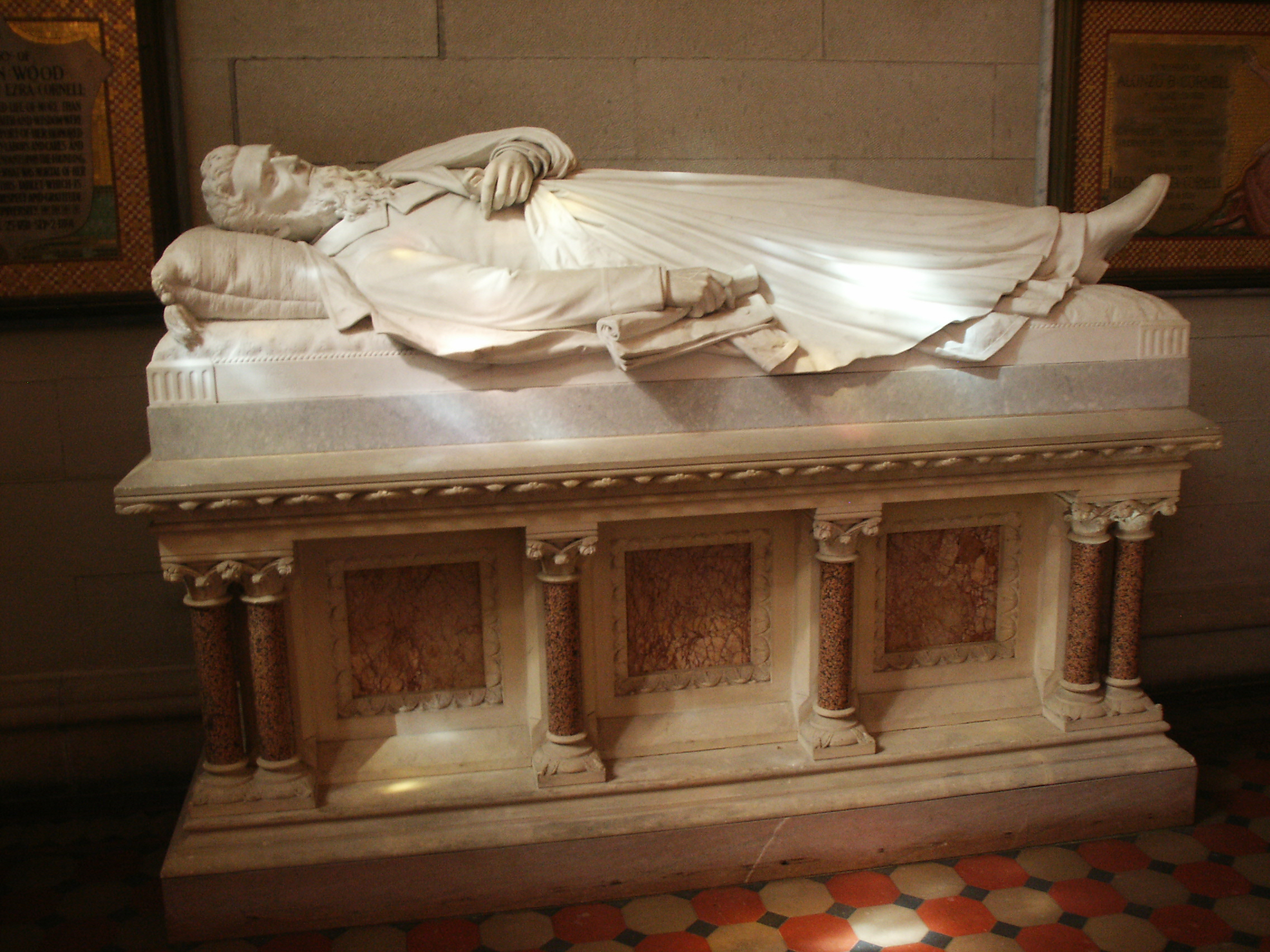
Ezra Cornell's sarcophagus

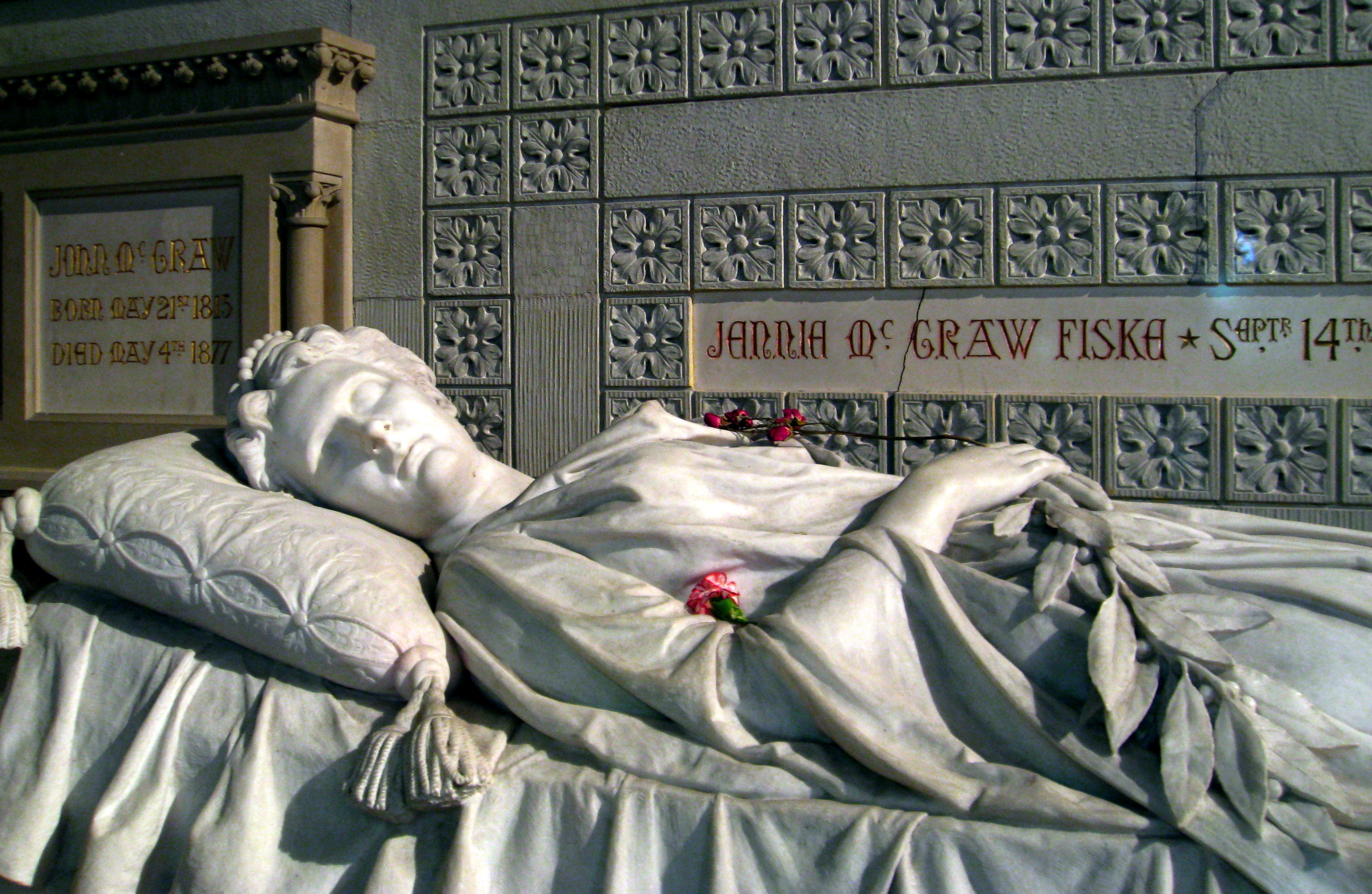
Jennie McGraw's sarcophagus
