= Katharine Lamb Tait =

- Born: June 3, 1895; Alpine, New Jersey
- Died: August 11, 1981 (aged 86); Cresskill, New Jersey
- Known for: Stained Glass
- Spouse: Trevor S. Tait (m. 1925)

Katharine Lamb Tait (3 June 1895 – 11 August 1981) was an American stained glass and mosaics designer, painter, muralist, and illustrator. She was the head designer at J&R Lamb Studios for more than four decades, and created notable commissions for the Tuskegee Institute Chapel and for chapels at the United States Marine Corps’ Camp Lejeune, among others.

== Early life ==
Katharine Lamb was born on June 3, 1895, to Charles Rollinson Lamb and Ella Condie Lamb in Alpine, New Jersey. Charles was an architect and designer, and was president of J&R Lamb Studios and the Stained Glass Association of America. Ella was an award-winning artist and stained glass designer. From a young age, Katharine was influenced by her artistic parents.

Tait attended the Friends Seminary in New York City, graduating in 1912. She studied at a number of art and design schools, including the Art Students League of New York, Columbia College, the National Academy Museum and School, and Cooper Union. She taught at the latter from 1922 until 1926. Her first commercial work as an artist was for the Fleishman Company in New York City, where she was employed in the advertising department.

== Career ==
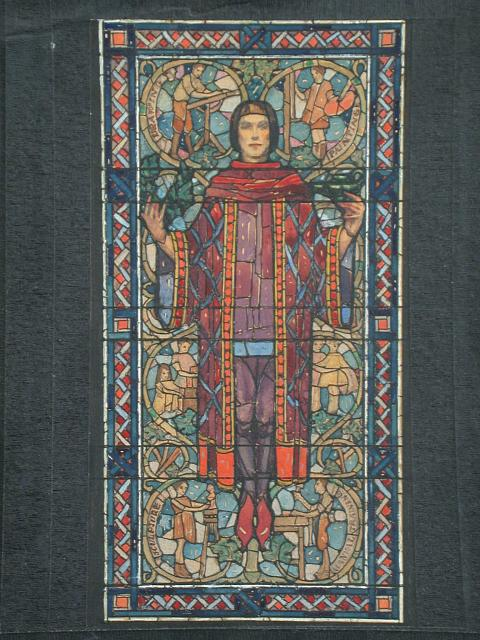
Design drawing for the Froelich Memorial Window in the Newark Museum by Katherine Lamb Tait, J&R Lamb Studios, c. 1927.

In 1921, Tait joined her family's company, J&R Lamb Studios. She designed stained glass windows, mosaics, and other ecclesiastical art, including altar crosses, candlesticks, stone lettering, and woodwork for choir stalls and pulpits. Her work was influenced by trips to France, England, and Italy, and the medieval stained glass she saw in cathedrals there.

Tait married Trevor S. Tait in November 1925. Together they had four children: Barrie, Robin, Colin, and Kevin. During this time, Tait continued occasionally designing from home. One of her major commissions from this period was for the Singing Window in the Tuskegee Institute Chapel in Alabama. The window, completed in 1932, illustrated eleven spirituals, including "Go Down Moses," "Swing Low, Sweet Chariot," and "Deep River."

Tait became the head designer at J&R Lamb Studios in 1936, and soon returned to working full-time. In 1945, her award-winning designs led to the firm receiving a commission from the United States Marine Corps. Lamb Studios was to create a number of windows for the Protestant and Catholic Chapels at Camp Lejeune in North Carolina. Although Tait's work won them the commission, the company did not reveal that a woman would be designing the windows until after details were finalized. Tait designed both sets of windows over the course of almost two years. Her work was praised by the Marine Corps, and she received letters of thanks from then-Commandant Robert H. Barrow and Major General David B. Barker (Commanding General, Camp Lejeune).

During her career, Tait was a member of a number of professional organizations, including the Stained Glass Association of America, the National Society of Mural Painters, and the National Arts Club.

She continued to work full-time as the head designer until 1979, and was the last member of the Lamb family to work at the firm. She designed more than 1,000 commissions over the course of her career.

On August 11, 1981, Tait died at the age of 86 in Cresskill, New Jersey.

== Selected works ==
- Arts Education, Hugo B. Froelich Memorial Window, donated by the Manual Training Teachers of Newark to the Newark Museum, Newark, New Jersey, 1927.
- Singing Window, Tuskegee Institute Chapel, Tuskegee, Alabama, 1932
- United States Marine Corps' Protestant and Catholic Chapels at Camp Lejeune, Jacksonville, North Carolina, 1948 (Protestant chapel: all nave, rose & entry windows; Catholic chapel: all nave)
- First Baptist Church, Richmond, Virginia, 1949 (all nave)
- Presbyterian Church, Lapeer, Michigan, 1951 and 1970 (12 windows)
- Mariners Church, Detroit, Michigan, c. 1955 (all)
- St. James Episcopal Church, Richmond, Virginia, 1961 (3 nave)
- St. Paul Episcopal Cathedral, Buffalo, New York, 1961-1962 (clerestory)
- Calvary Methodist Church, Dumont, New Jersey, c. 1970 (20+ windows)
- Church of the Advent, Kenmore, New York, c. 1970s (all)
- Saint Andrew's Memorial Episcopal Church, Detroit, Michigan (11 windows)
- St. John's Episcopal Church, Hollywood, Florida (11 windows)
- First Presbyterian Church, Tenafly, New Jersey (chapel, all)
- All Saints Episcopal Church, Detroit, Michigan (all)
- Christ Church, Roanoke, Virginia (12+ windows)
- All Saints Episcopal Church, Birmingham, Alabama (24 windows)
