= Ella Condie Lamb =

American painter

- Ella Condie ca. 1878
- Born: Ella Condie; August 30, 1862; New York, New York
- Died: January 23, 1936 (aged 73); Cresskill, New Jersey
- Known for: Painting, Murals, Stained Glass
- Spouse: Charles Rollinson Lamb (m. 1888)

Ella Condie Lamb (1862 - 1936) was an American painter and stained glass artist. She was one of first women to be accepted into the National Society of Mural Painters.

== Biography ==
Lamb née Condie was born on August 30, 1862, in New York City. In 1878 she began studying at the National Academy of Design. In 1881 she began studying at the Art Students League of New York. Her teachers in New York included James Wells Champney, William Merritt Chase, Frederick Dielman, Walter Shirlaw, Charles Yardley Turner and Lemuel Wilmarth. In 1884 Lamb traveled to Europe to study, returning in 1885.

In 1888 she married Charles Rollinson Lamb with whom she had five children. An artist is his own right, Charles Rollinson Lamb was a second generation owner of the J&R Lamb Studios. Ella joined the studio creating stained glass designs and murals.

Lamb was a member of the National Arts Club and the National Society of Mural Painters. She was also a member of the National Association of Women Artists. She exhibited at the National Academy of Design, the Society of American Artists, the Pennsylvania Academy of the Fine Arts, the Art Institute of Chicago, the National Arts Club, and the Society of Independent Artists.

She exhibited her work at the Palace of Fine Arts at the 1893 World's Columbian Exposition in Chicago, Illinois.

She also participated in the Atlanta Exposition in 1895, and the Pan-American Exposition of 1901 in Buffalo, New York.

In the late 1890s she designed the mosaic mural in the apse of Sage Chapel at Cornell University.

Lamb died on January 25, 1936, in Cresskill, New Jersey.

== Legacy ==
Ella and Charles' daughter Katharine Lamb Tait (1895–1981) joined J&R Lamb Studios in 1921. She was the head designer from 1936 through 1979. Ella and Charles' son Karl Barre Lamb (1890–1969) joined J&R Lamb Studios in 1923. He was head of the Studio from 1932 through 1969, streamlining the studio to focus solely on glass.

== Gallery ==
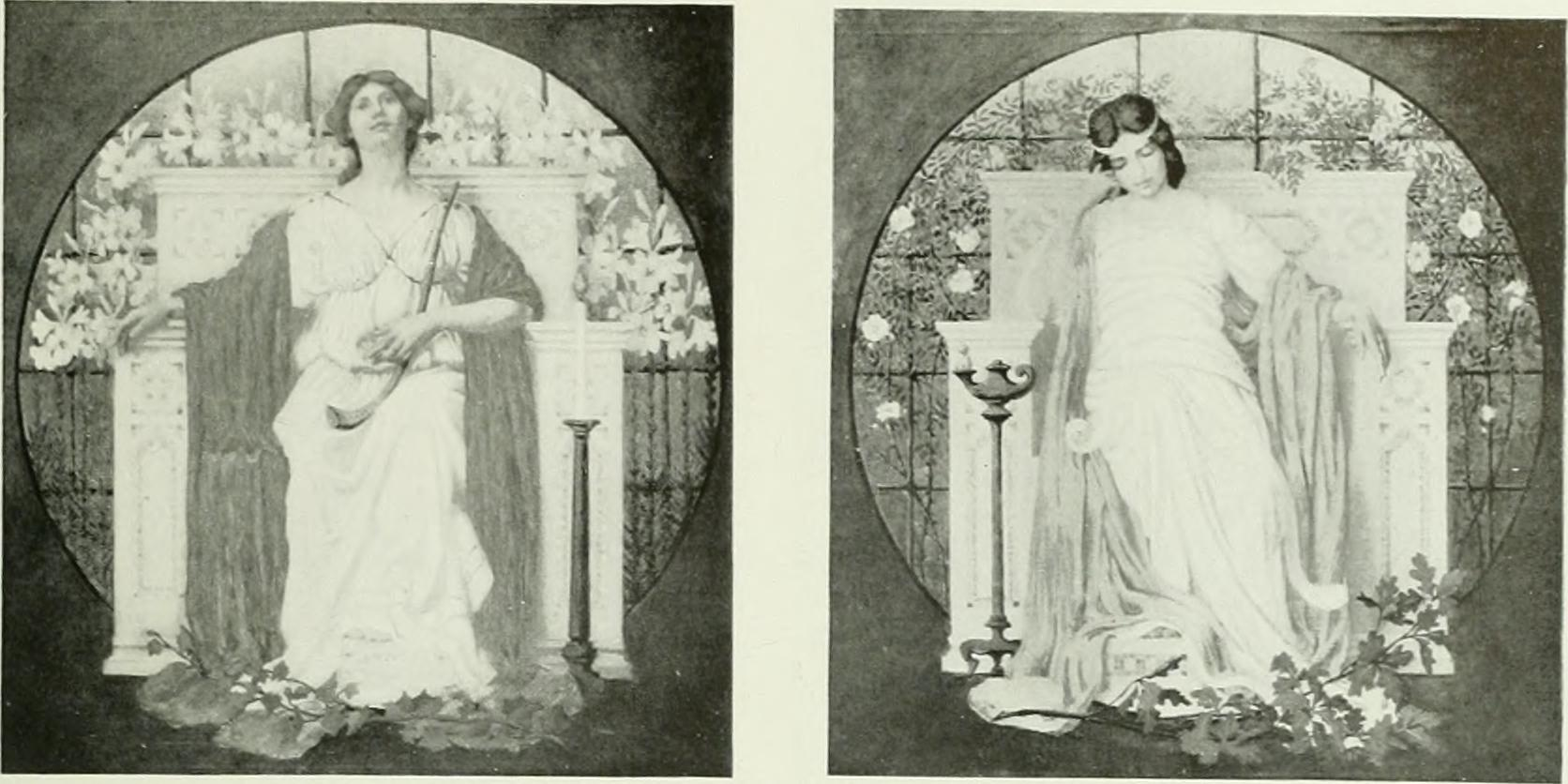
Hope and Memory, mosaics from the Lakewood Memorial Chapel in Minneapolis (1897)

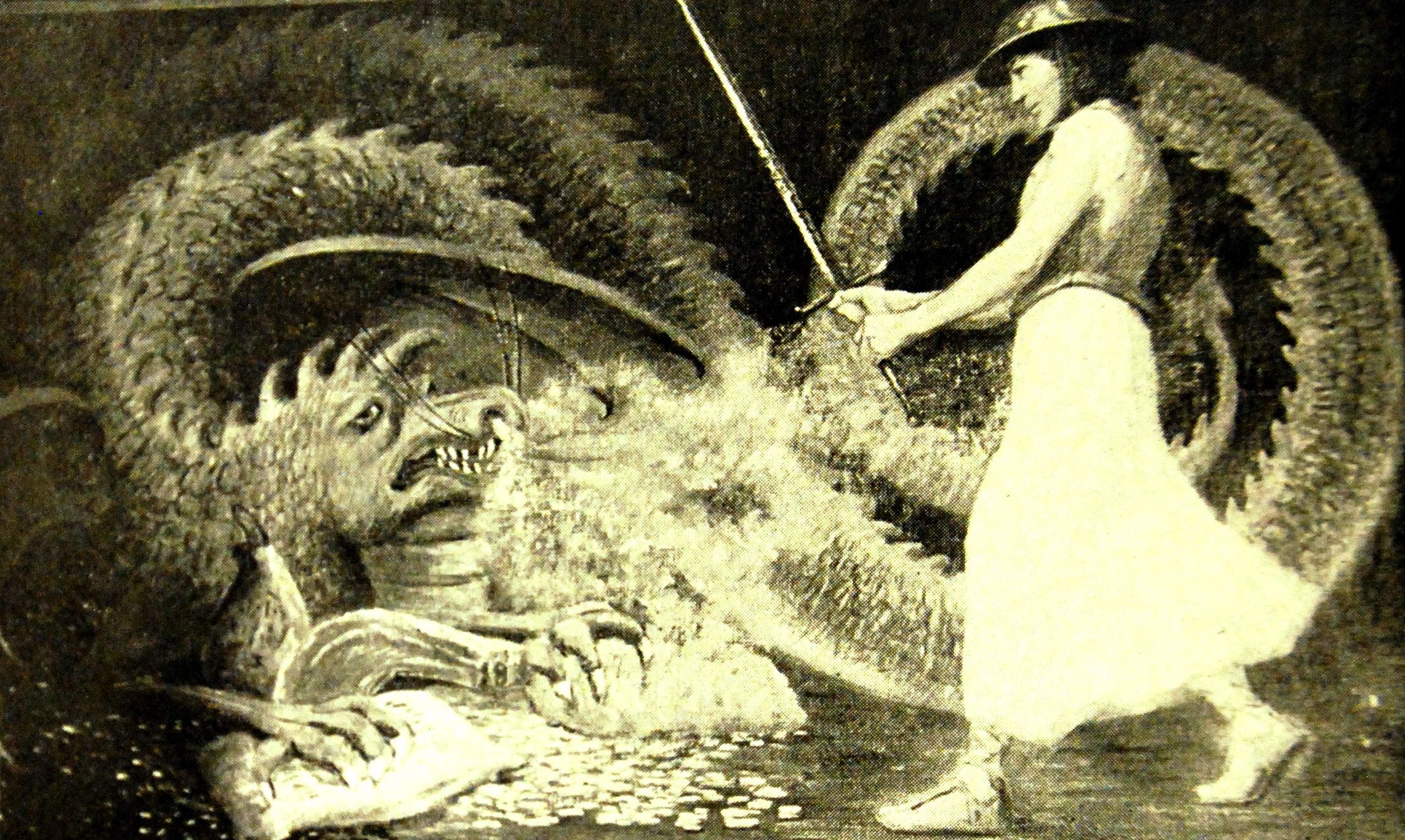
For Victory Not One Large Sword Suspended By A Thread, But A Sword In The Hand Of Every Citizen - World War I Morale Poster, (1917)
