= Charles Rollinson Lamb =

American architect

- Born: 1860; New York, New York
- Died: February 22, 1942 (aged 81–82)
- Known for: Architecture
- Spouse: Ella Condie Lamb (m. 1888)

Charles Rollinson Lamb (1860 – February 22, 1942) was an American architect and sculptor.

Born and raised in New York City, he studied under William Sartain at the Art Students' League. He was a member of his father's firm, the J&R Lamb Studios. He was a founding member of the National Sculpture Society. He was best known for ecclesiastical architecture and memorial and historical art. Lamb was the designer of the Dewey Arch in 1899.

In 1888 he married Ella Condie Lamb with whom he had five children. Ella joined the studio creating stained glass designs and murals.

Lamb designed the World War I memorial in Chelsea Park, Manhattan, with a bronze statue of a soldier by Philip Martiny.

== Legacy ==
Ella and Charles' daughter Katharine Lamb Tait (1895–1981) joined J&R Lamb Studios in 1921. She was the head designer from 1936 through 1979. Ella and Charles' son Karl Barre Lamb (1890–1969) joined J&R Lamb Studios in 1923. He was head of the Studio from 1932 through 1969, streamlining the studio to focus solely on glass.
