= Johannes Kirchmayer =

American woodcarver (1860–1930)

John Kirchmayer
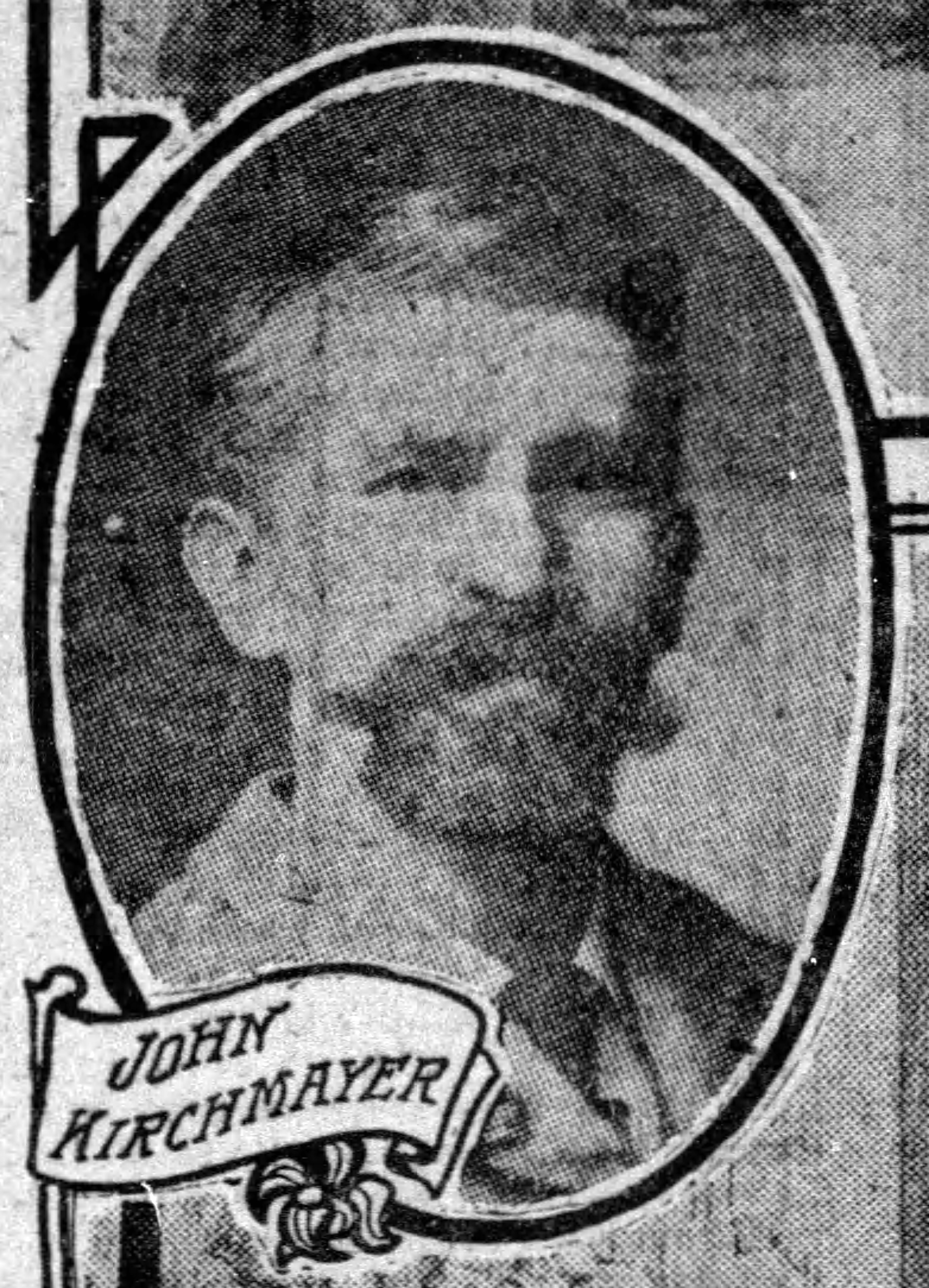
- Born: Johannes Kirchmayer; March 31, 1860; Oberammergau, Bavaria
- Died: November 29, 1930 (aged 70); Cambridge, Massachusetts, U.S.
- Occupation: Woodcarver

Johannes Kirchmayer also known as John Kirchmayer (March 31, 1860 – November 29, 1930) was one of the leading woodcarvers in the United States, active primarily in the Boston area.

Kirchmayer was born March 31, 1860, in Oberammergau, Bavaria. After learning sculpture in Germany, he emigrated in 1880 to Boston and took up work mainly in church sculpture. He was a founding member of the Boston Society of Arts and Crafts with his work featured in an 1887 exhibition. After 1898, in the employ of Boston furnituremaking and architectural woodworking firm Irving and Casson, he worked on the buildings of the noted American Gothic-revivalist Ralph Adams Cram.

Kirchmayer's notable work around Boston includes carvings in The Church of the Advent, Brimmer Street, Boston; All Saints' Church, Ashmont, Dorchester; the Second Church, Newton; and Unity Church in North Easton. He also designed the mantling of the Anderson Memorial Bridge over the Charles River.

His work outside the Boston area includes carvings in Christ Church Cathedral, Springfield, Massachusetts; the Church of Saint Mary the Virgin, West 46th Street, New York City; St. Mary's Anglican Church, Windsor, Ontario; the Church of the Saviour, Syracuse, New York; Unitarian Memorial Church in Fairhaven, MA; the Cathedral of the Madeleine in Salt Lake City, and the James J. Hill House, Saint Paul, Minnesota. At $1.00 an hour, he was the highest paid workman on the Hill House construction project. He is also responsible for the carvings at Christ Church Cranbrook and on one door carved images of the craftsmen who worked on the church, including himself.

Kirchmayer died November 29, 1930, at his home in Cambridge, Massachusetts. He was buried at Mount Pleasant Cemetery in Arlington, Massachusetts.

== Gallery ==
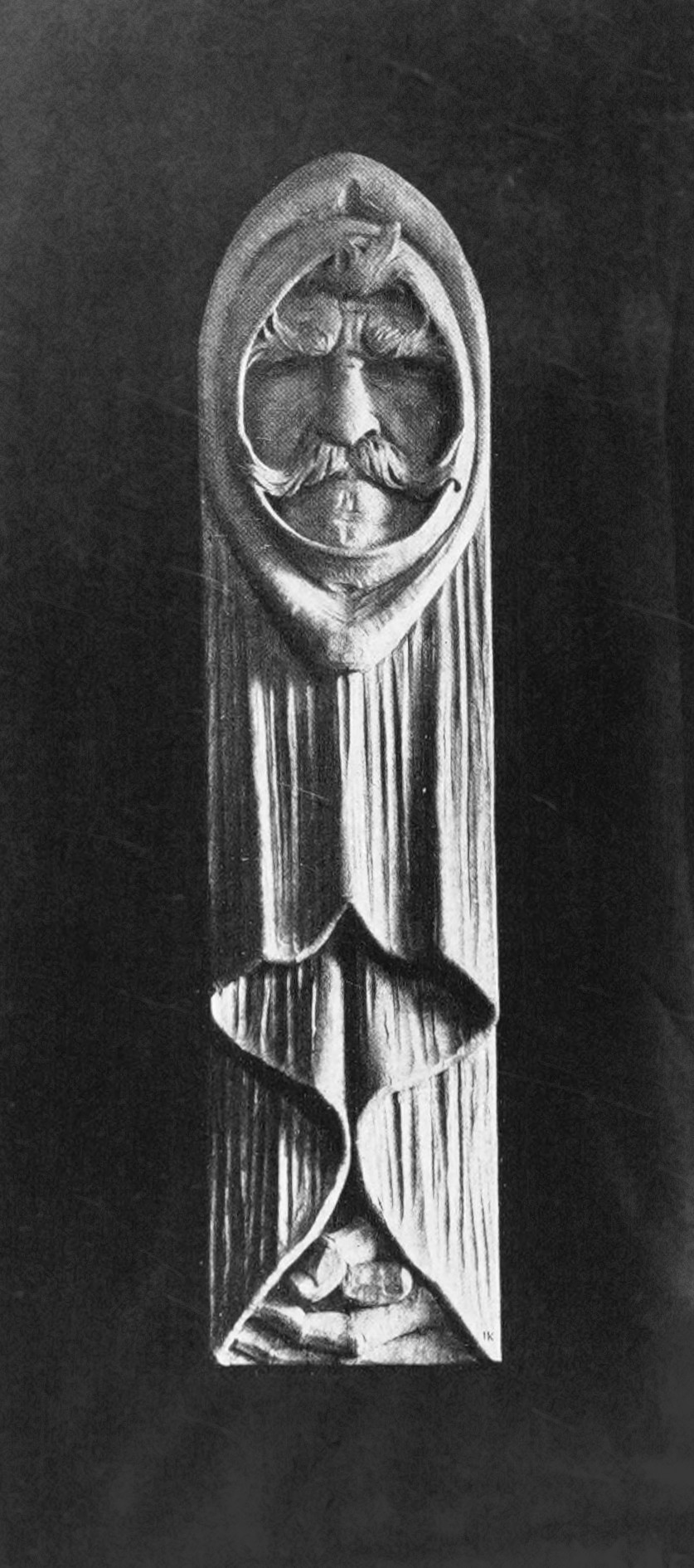
Self-portrait in wood

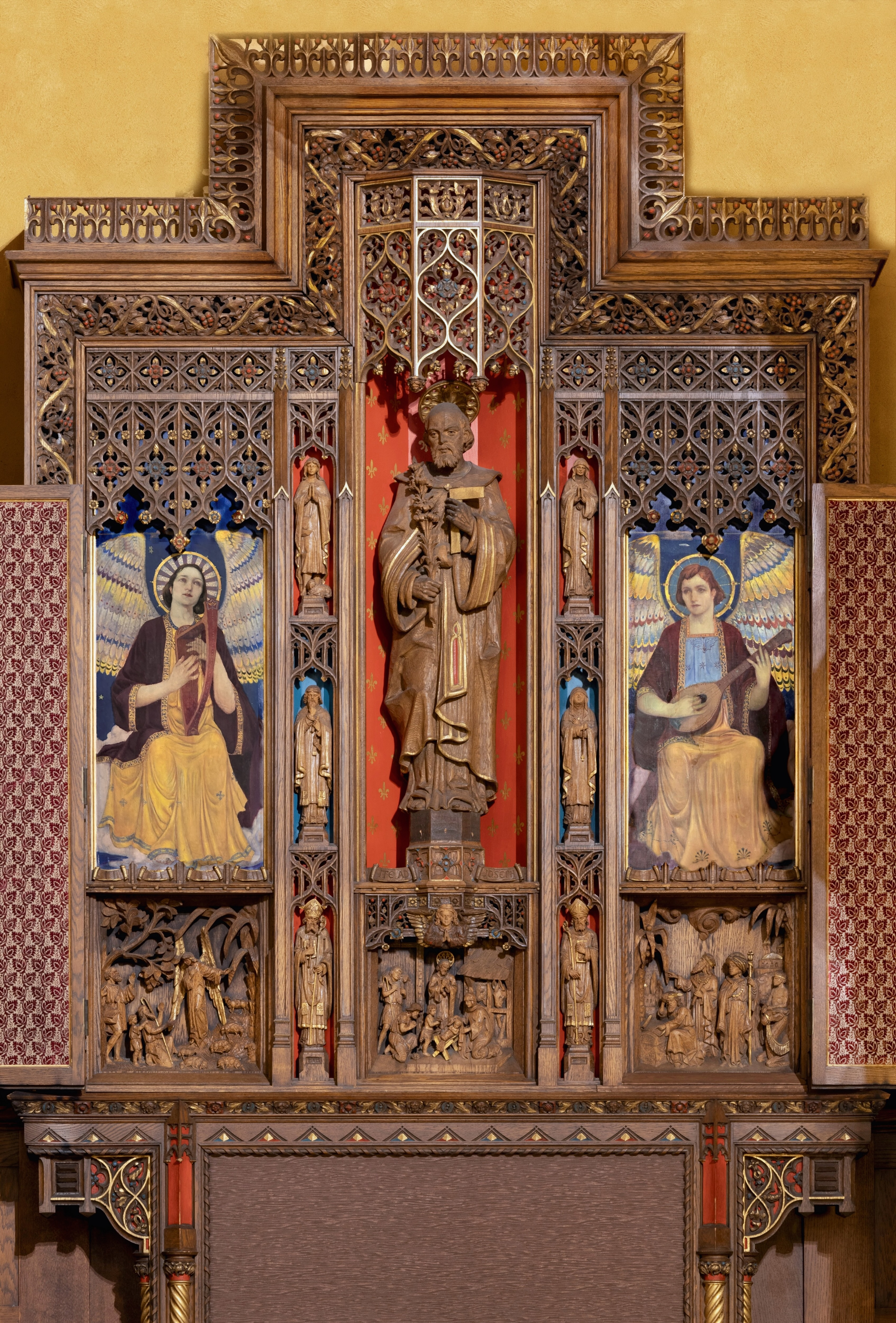
St. Joseph Altar at Cathedral of the Madeleine Salt Lake City

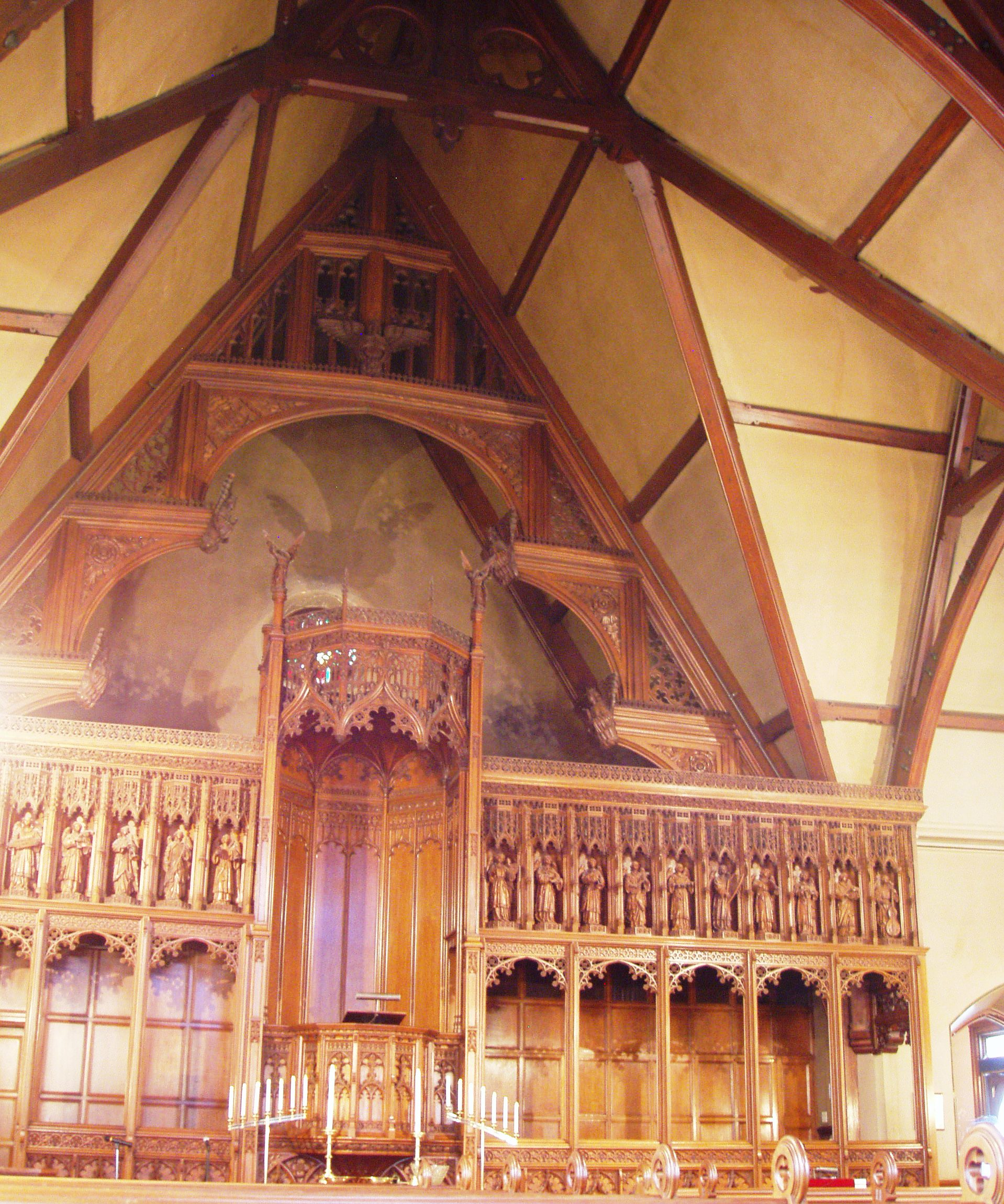
Unity Church

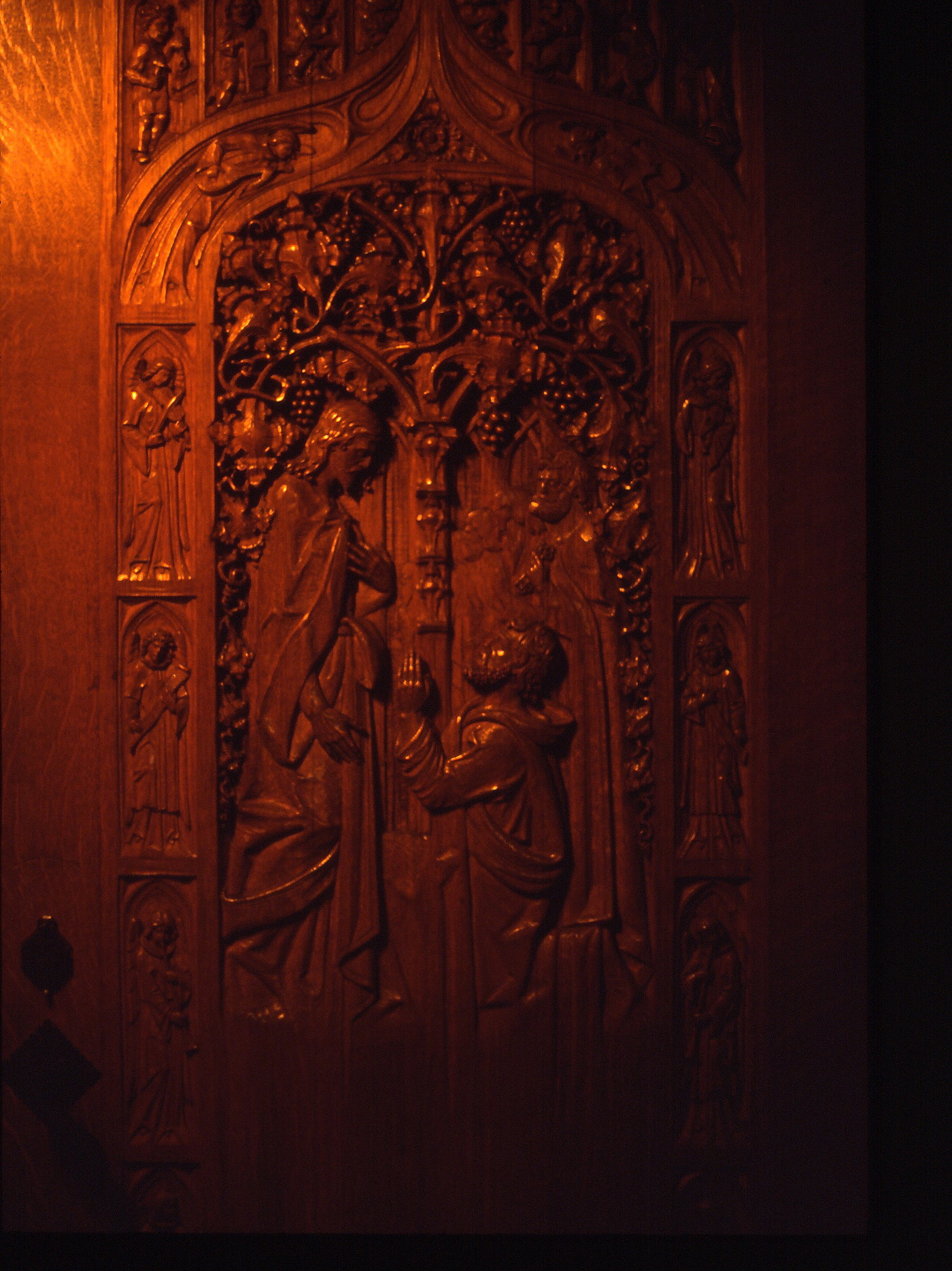
Doubting Thomas door, Christ Church Cranbrook

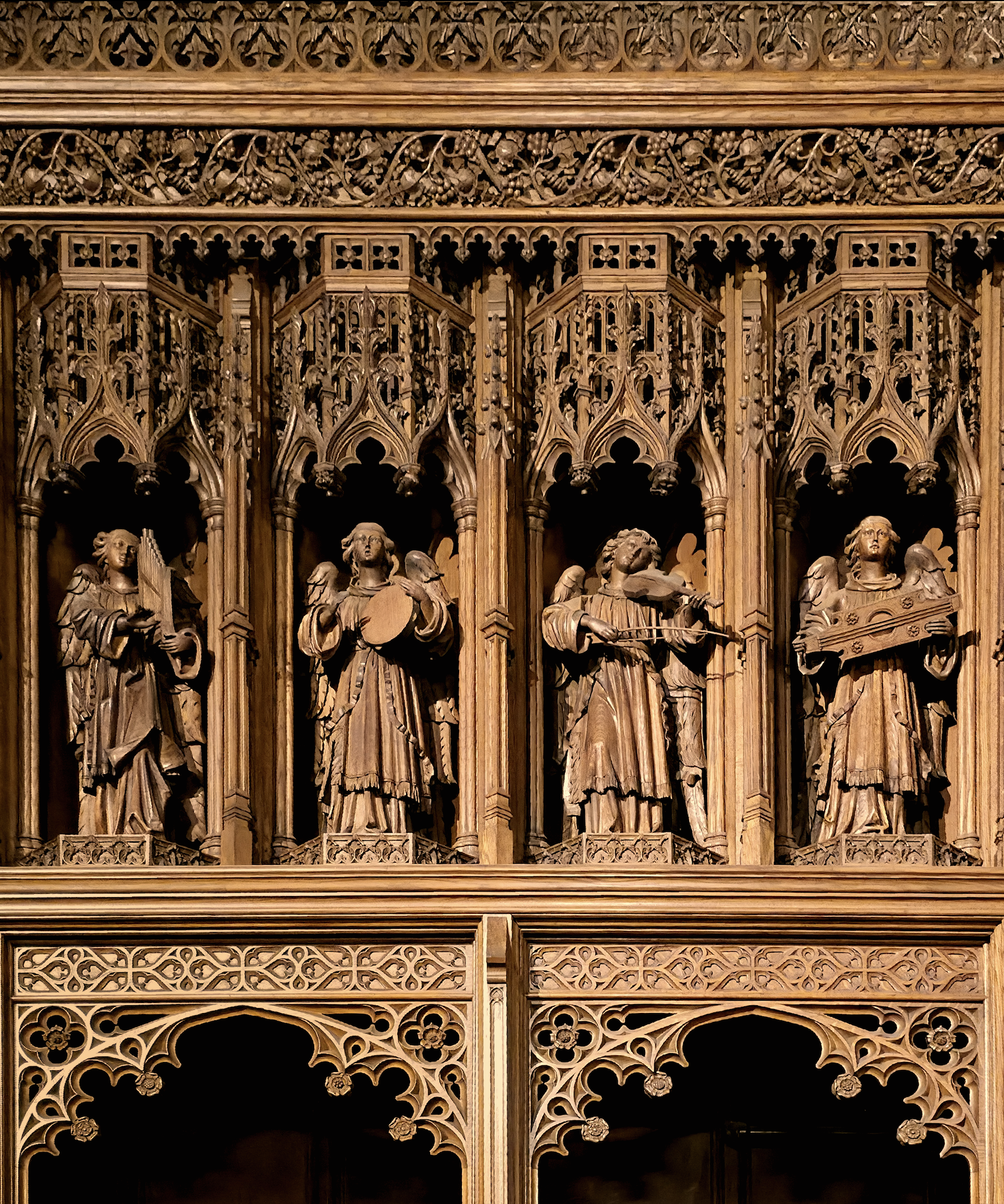
Angel carvings at Unity Church North Easton, MA

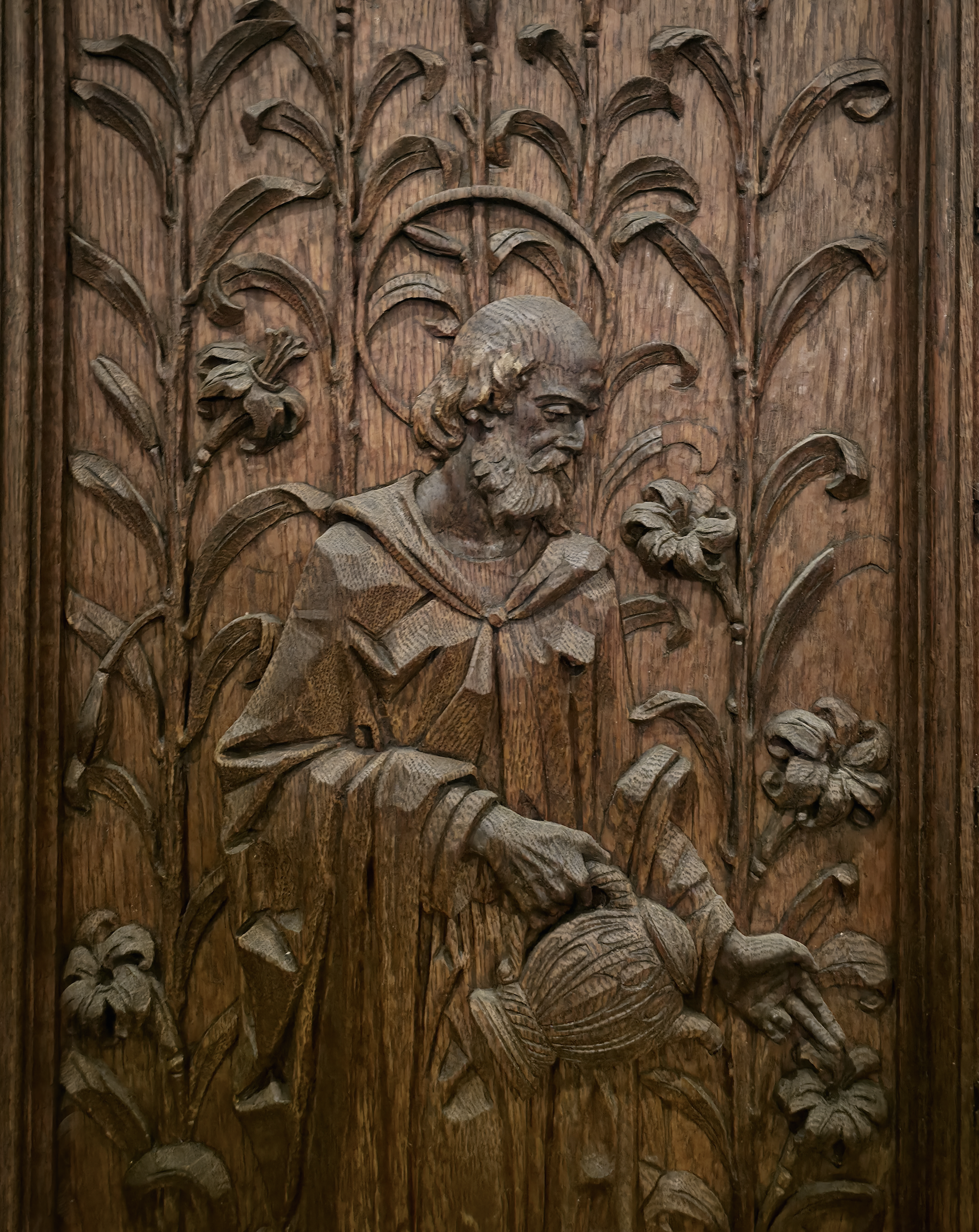
From All Saints Ashmont
