= Staff (building material) =

Artificial stone

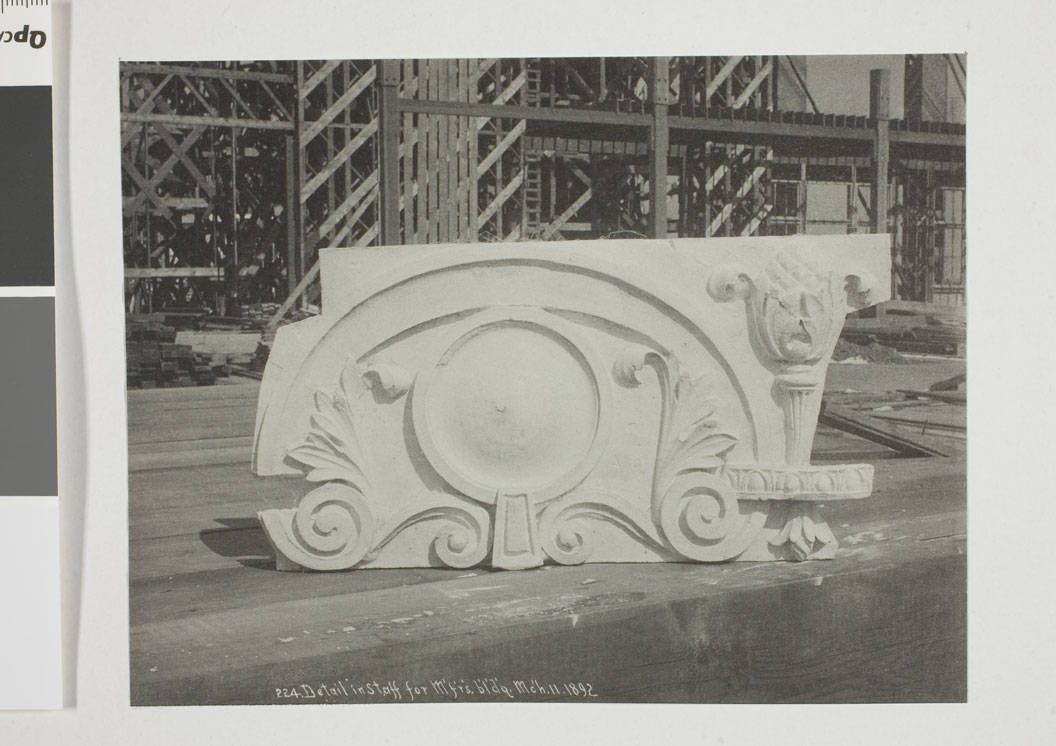
Detail of a cornice moulded in staff, Manufactures and Liberal Arts Building at the Chicago World's Columbian Exposition, 1893

Staff is a kind of artificial stone used for covering and ornamenting temporary buildings. It is defined as " composition of plaster and fibrous material used for a temporary finish and in ornamental work, as on exposition buildings.".

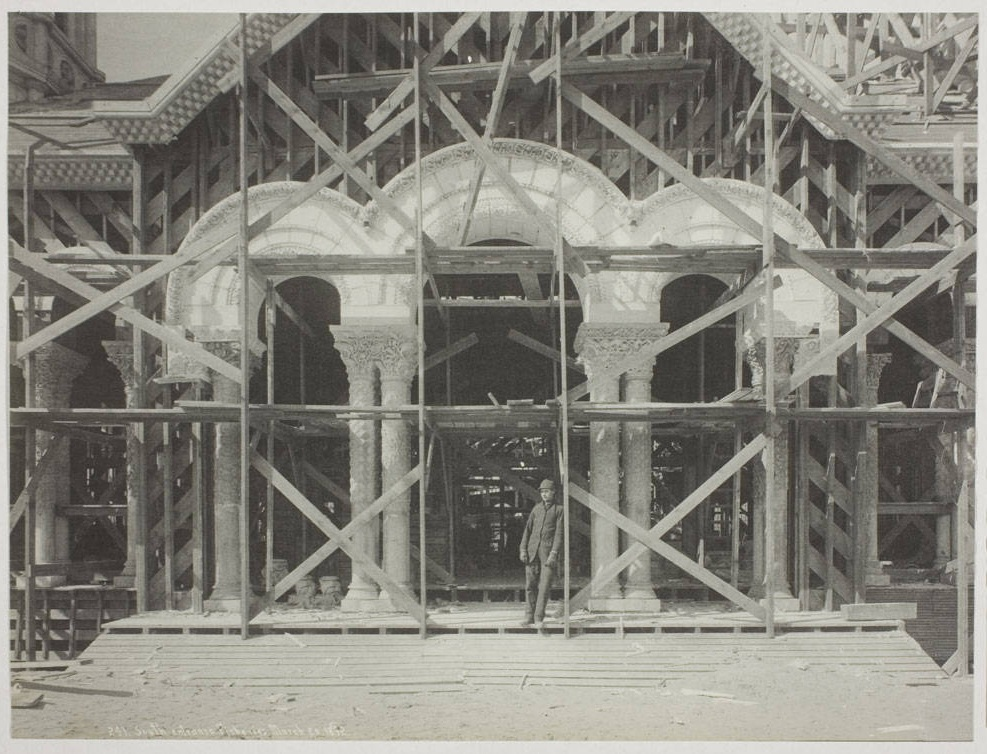
Facade of the Fisheries Building, World's Columbian Exposition. Three pillared archways are constructed and finished, in front of a bare wall of wooden studding that has not yet been rendered.

It is chiefly made of plaster of Paris (powdered gypsum), with a little cement, glycerin, and dextrin, mixed with water until it is about as thick as molasses. When staff is cast in molds, it can form any shape. To strengthen it, coarse cloth or bagging, or fibers of hemp or jute, are put into the molds before casting. It becomes hard enough in about a half-hour to be removed and fastened on the building in construction. Staff may easily be bent, sawed, bored, or nailed. Its natural color is murky white, but it may be made to resemble any kind of stone.

Staff was invented in France in about 1876 and was used in the construction and ornamentation of the buildings of the Paris Expositions of 1878 and of 1889. It was also largely used in the construction of the buildings of the World's Columbian Exposition at Chicago in 1893, at the Omaha and Buffalo Expositions in 1898 and 1901, at the Louisiana Purchase Exposition in 1904, and at later expositions, and on temporary buildings of other kinds.

== See also ==
- Dewey Arch
- Building material
- Glazed architectural terra-cotta a material also made into many decorative forms, more permanent than Staff
- List of building materials
