= Hollingshead =

Hollingshead (or Holinshed) is a surname that may refer to:

- Frances M. Hollingshead (1876–1963), American public health physician
- Gordon Hollingshead (1892–1952), American movie producer
- Greg Hollingshead (born 1947), Canadian novelist
- Harry Hollingshead (1915–1998), Australian rules footballer
- Holly Hollingshead (1853–1926), American baseball player
- Iain Hollingshead (born 1980), British freelance journalist and novelist
- John Hollingshead (1827–1904) English theatrical impresario
- Megan Hollingshead (born 1968), American theatre and voice actor
- Michael Hollingshead (died 1984), British scientist
- Mike Hollingshead, American stormchaser
- Raphael Holinshed (1529–1580), 16th century British author of Holinshed's Chronicles
- Richard Hollingshead (1900–1975), American inventor of the drive-in theater
- Tam Hollingshead (born c. 1955), American football coach
- Vanessa Hollingshead, American comedian

== See also ==
- Hollings (disambiguation)
