= Henry W. Sage =

American businessman, philanthropist (1814–1897)

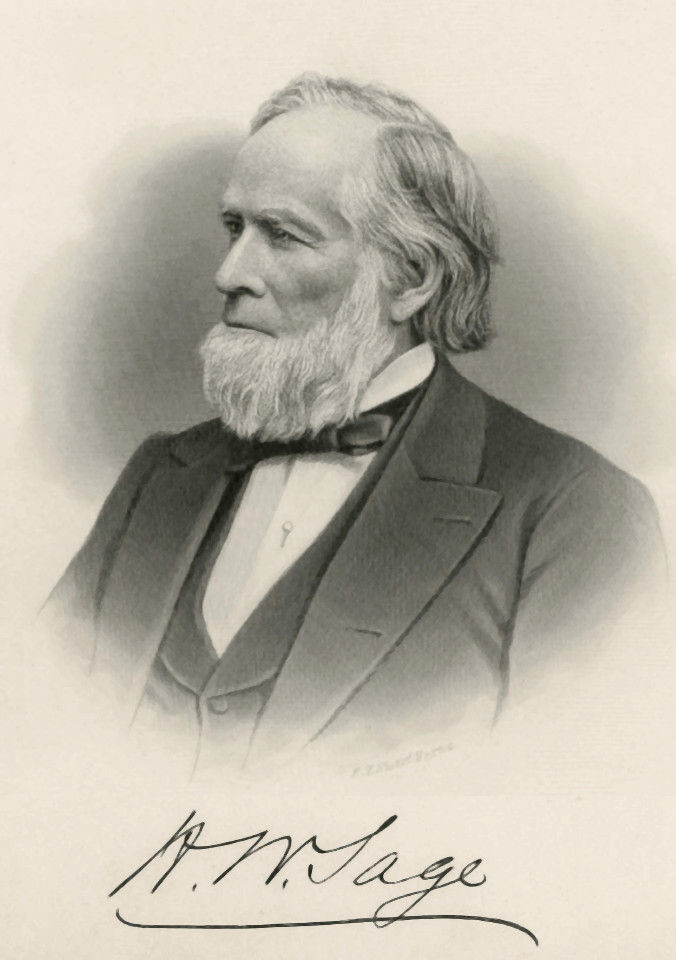
- Sage, c. 1880

Member of the New York State Assembly
- In office January 1, 1847 – December 31, 1847

Personal details
- Born: Henry Williams Sage; January 31, 1814 Middletown, Connecticut, U.S.
- Died: September 18, 1897 (aged 83) Ithaca, New York, U.S.
- Party: Whig
- Spouse: Susan Elizabeth Linn (m. 1840; died 1885)
- Children: 2
- Relatives: Henry M. Sage (grandson); Josiah Williams (uncle)
- Education: The Albany Academy; Yale College

Henry Williams Sage (January 31, 1814 – September 18, 1897) was a wealthy New York State businessman, philanthropist, and early benefactor and trustee of Cornell University.

== Early life ==
Sage was born in Middletown, Connecticut on January 31, 1814. He was the son of Charles and Sally (née Williams) Sage. He was distantly related to Congressman Russell Sage, family of Colonel Ira Yale Sage. He spent part of his early childhood in Bristol, Connecticut before moving to Ithaca, New York in 1827.

Two uncles, Timothy S. Williams and Josiah B. Williams, were New York State Senators from the Ithaca area.

== Career ==
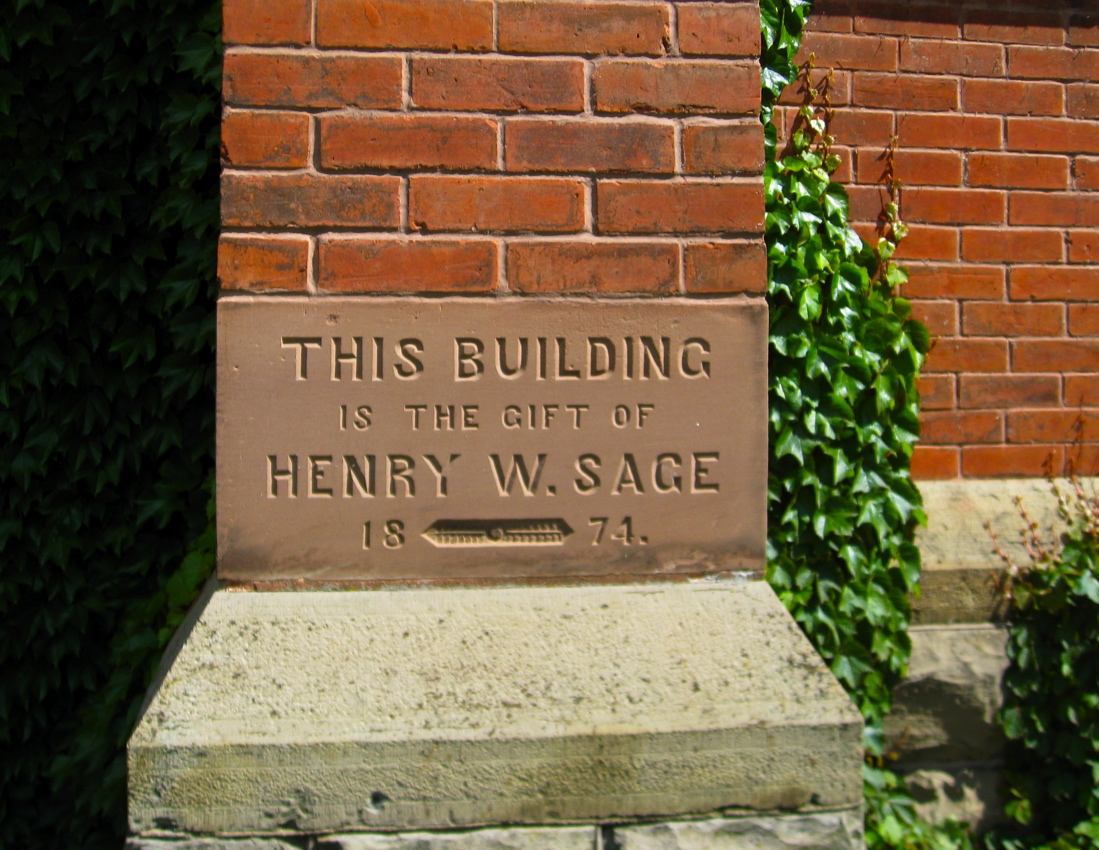
Dedication cornerstone on Sage Chapel at Cornell University

After briefly studying medicine at Ithaca under Austin Church, he began work for his uncles' forwarding firm, with a line of barges on the Erie Canal, which he took over by 1837. In 1847, he was elected to the New York State Assembly as a Whig.

In 1854, he purchased a tract of land at Bell Ewart on Lake Simcoe, 51 miles north of Toronto, Ontario, Canada and was soon processing timber on a large scale. From that point, the Ontario, Simcoe and Huron Union Railroad carried the lumber to its wharves in Toronto, offering Sage a reduced rate for a specified number of carloads per month. The lumber was shipped across Lake Ontario to Sage's wholesale lumber yards at Albany, New York. He did not own the timber lands on Lake Simcoe, but rather purchased logs from farmers eager to clear their lands.

Moving to Brooklyn in 1857, he became active in the Plymouth Congregational Church, where the Rev. Henry Ward Beecher, son of Lyman Beecher and brother of Harriet Beecher Stowe, was pastor. He later endowed the Lyman Beecher Lectureship on Preaching at Yale Divinity School.

About this time he was also purchasing lumber in Michigan, as the Ontario supply began to wane. In 1863, he became a business partner with John McGraw. The two founded the town of Wenona, Michigan, named for the mother of Hiawatha and now part of Bay City, in 1864. The two earned a fortune in lumber and land in Wisconsin, Michigan, and New York.

In 1865, Sage purchased timber berths in Oakley township, Muskoka, necessary to keep the Bell Ewart mill running. The construction of a canal was required to run the logs from the Black River to Lake Couchiching. With previous experience on the New York State Assembly and legislation involving improvements to the Erie Canal, he attracted the interest of other Lake Simcoe lumbermen to form the Rama Timber Transport Company in 1868. The canal to divert the logs into Lake Couchiching opened in 1869, later that year Sage sold the Bell Ewart mill and associated timber berths to Messrs. Silliman and Beecher. Young Harry Beecher was a nephew of Sage's pastor, Rev. Henry Ward Beecher.

He funded construction of what is now the Sage Library of the Bay County Library System in Michigan in 1884. It was designed by Cornell architecture professor Charles Babcock in the French Château-style, and is today a historical landmark.

== Involvement with Cornell ==
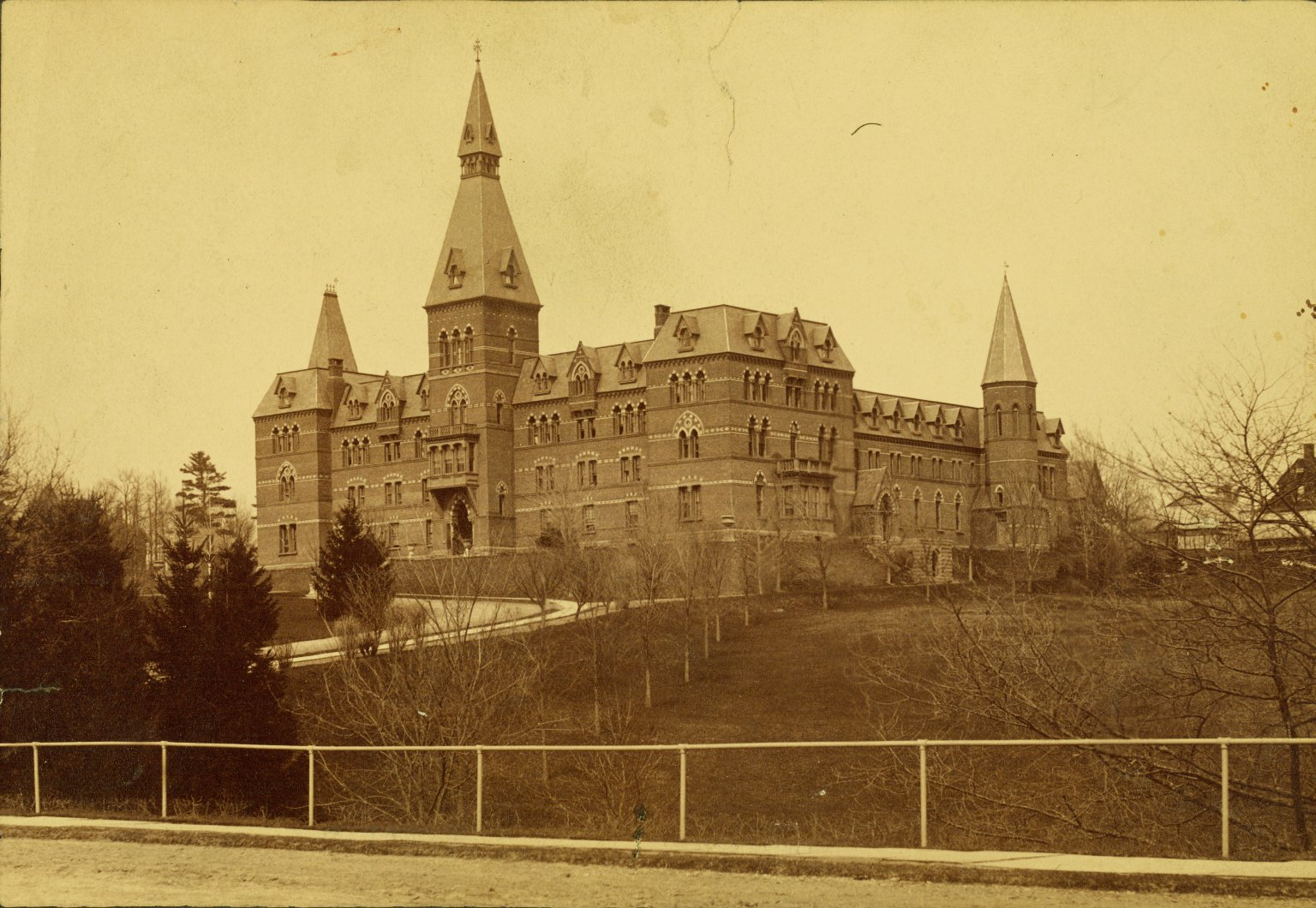
Sage College for Women, now Sage Hall

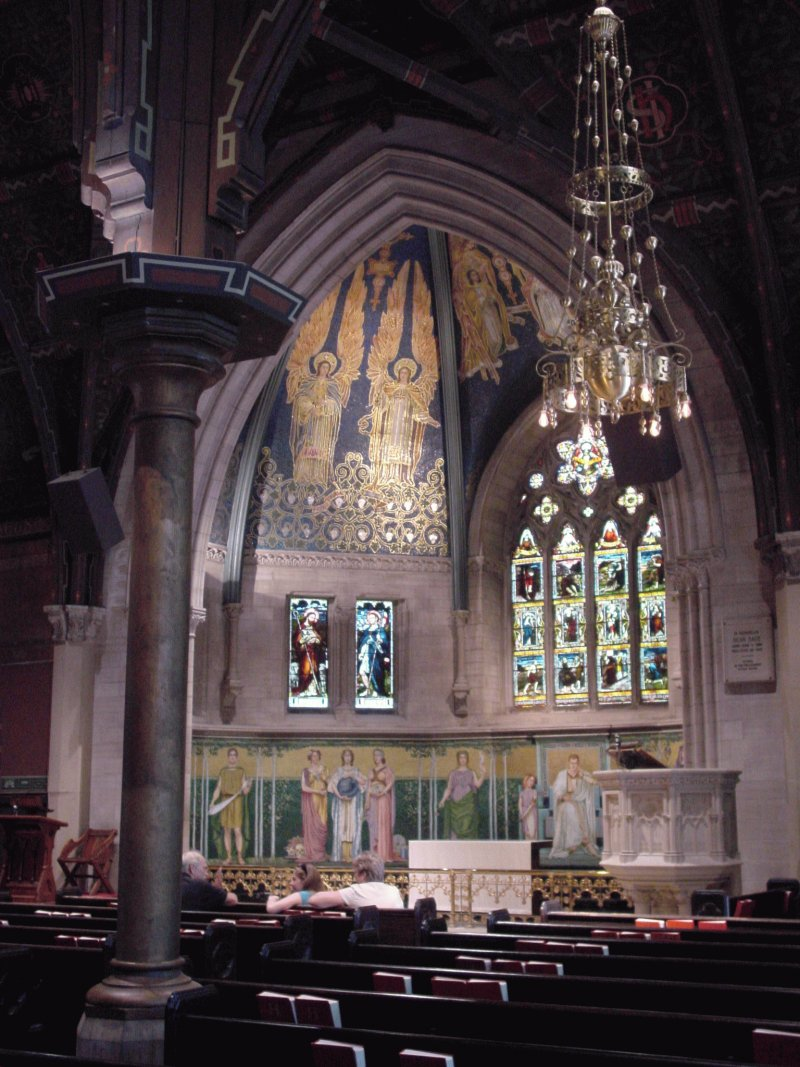
Sage Chapel.

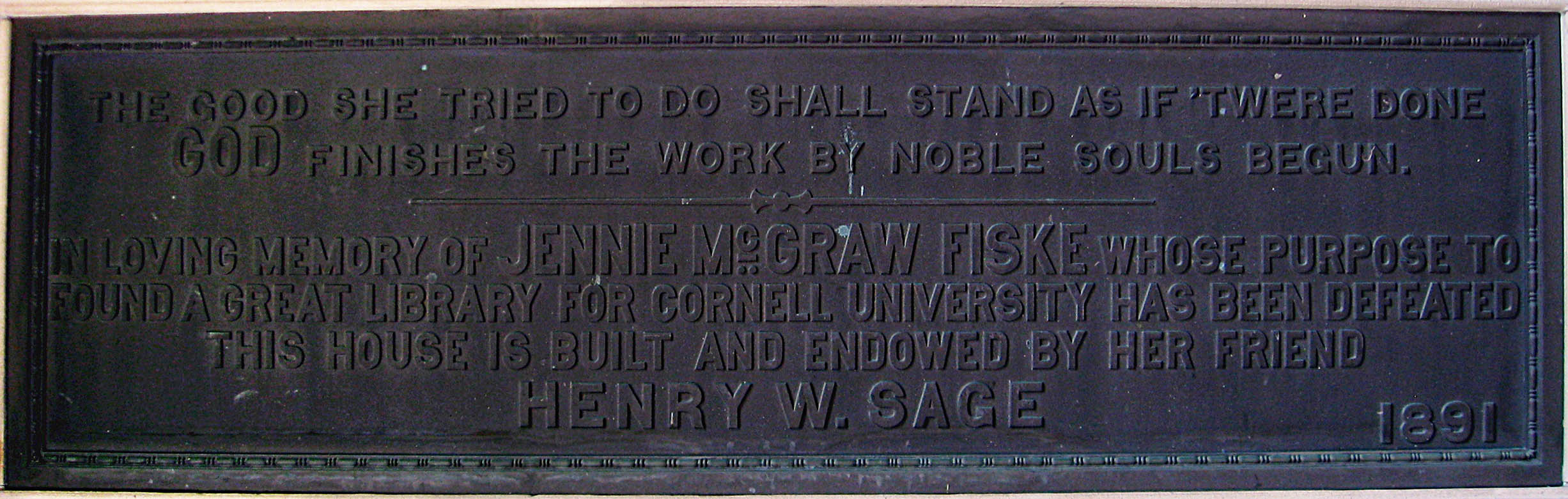
Dedication plaque on Uris Library

Henry Sage attended the inauguration of Cornell University on October 7, 1868. On this occasion Sage was introduced to Andrew Dickson White by their mutual friend John McGraw. As recounted by White in his Autobiography, Sage told White, "I believe you are right in regard to admitting women ... when you are ready to move in the matter, let me know." Within a year, White had admitted Cornell's first female student, but since the university had only all-male dormitories, she was forced to rent a room in downtown Ithaca. This required a steep climb several times per day, which became treacherous in winter. White went to ask Sage for assistance, and Sage responded with an offer of $250,000 to build a women's college.

In 1870, Sage was elected to the board of trustees of Cornell University, and elected president of the board in 1875. At his direction, the university resisted selling its Wisconsin land grants in the aftermath of the Panic of 1873, earning millions of dollars for the university's endowment.

An avowed supporter of equal access to higher education, he established Sage College for Women, Cornell's first residence for female students (today known as Sage Hall and home to the Samuel Curtis Johnson Graduate School of Management). He also built Sage Chapel, the first non-denominational house of worship at a US university (and later endowed by his son Dean Sage); Sage House, now home to the Cornell University Press; the Sage Infirmary, now known as Schuyler House; and Stimson Hall, original home of the Cornell Medical College in Ithaca. He endowed the Susan Linn Sage School of Philosophy in the College of Arts and Sciences, named after his wife.

Sage's most notable contribution was the construction of the University Library (since 1962, Uris Library). Jennie McGraw, who had inherited his partner John's fortune in 1877, died of tuberculosis shortly after marrying University Librarian Daniel Willard Fiske. She bequeathed $1 million to build a library, but Fiske sued to break the will, sparking what became known as The Great Will Case. The United States Supreme Court ruled in Fiske's favor in 1890.

Infuriated by the decision, Sage donated funds for the construction of the Library himself, including a large plaque memorializing his indignation:

The good she tried to do shall stand as if 'twere done
GOD finishes the work by noble souls begun.
In loving memory of JENNIE MCGRAW FISKE whose purpose to
found a great library for Cornell University has been defeated
this house is built and endowed by her friend
HENRY W. SAGE.

Cornell's graduate student fellowship, known as the SAGE fellowship, is being named in honor of Sage. The Sage Fellowship covers tuition and provide a stipend for living expenses.

== Personal life ==
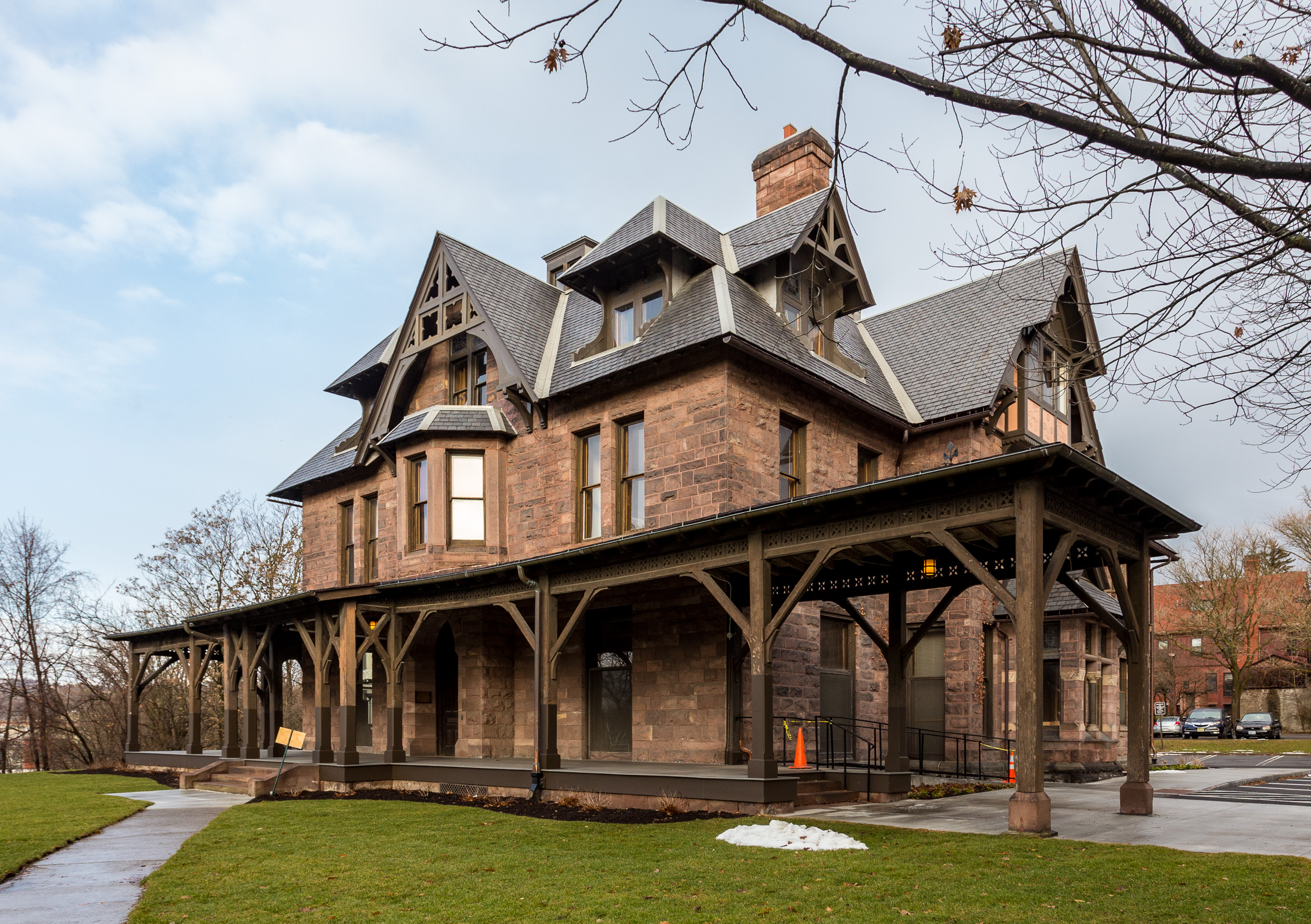
Henry Sage's mansion at 512 East State Street in Ithaca, later home to Cornell University Press

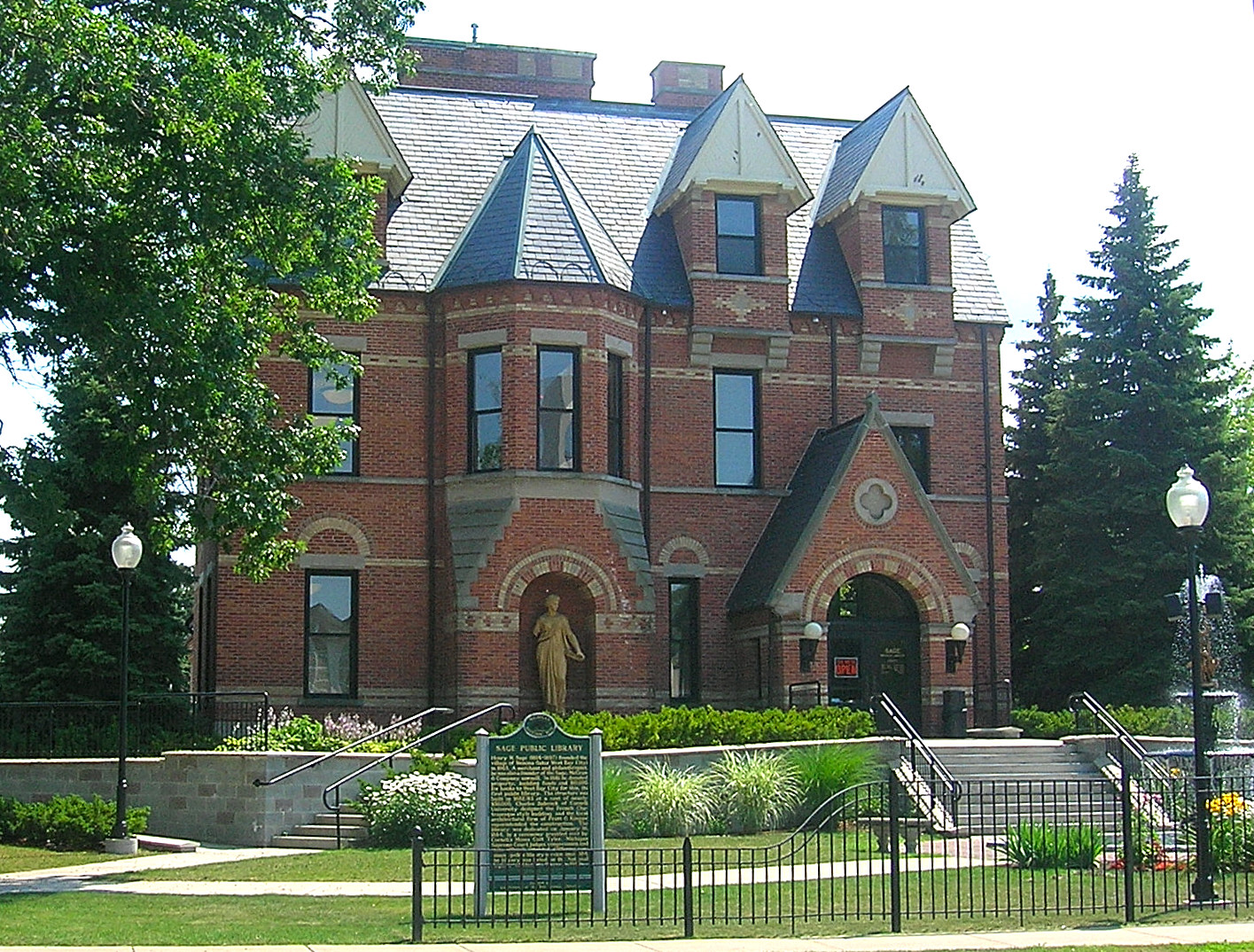
The Sage Library in Bay City, Michigan

On September 1, 1840, Sage was married to Susan Elizabeth Linn, the daughter of William Linn and granddaughter of Rev. William Linn who served as the first Chaplain of the United States House of Representatives in 1789. Together, they were the parents of:

- Dean Sage (1841–1902), who endowed the Sage Lecture, a sermon series at Sage Chapel.
- William Henry Sage (1844–1924), who graduated from Yale University in 1865 and would later fund the construction of Yale's Sage Hall, named for William's son DeWitt Linn Sage, in 1923. Himself later a Cornell trustee, William Sage also funded the construction of Percy Field, Cornell's original football field, as well as the stone arch bridge over Cascadilla Gorge.

His wife was killed in 1885 when she was thrown from her carriage in Ithaca. Sage died in Ithaca, New York on September 18, 1897. Sage is one of only fifteen people whose remains are interred in the chapel named for him, a list which includes founders Ezra Cornell and Andrew Dickson White.

== Descendants ==
His grandson Dean, named after the son, became president of Presbyterian Hospital in 1922, which affiliated with Columbia University College of Physicians and Surgeons in 1924. Presbyterian merged with New York Hospital, affiliated with what is now the Weill Cornell Medical College, in 1996.

Another grandson, Henry M. Sage (1868–1933), was a New York State senator and owned an estate in Menands, New York.

Academic offices
Preceded by Ezra Cornell	Chairman of Cornell Board of Trustees; 1875–1897	Succeeded by Roswell P. Flower
