= Hollings =

Hollings is a surname. Notable people with the surname include:

- Chloé Hollings, French-Australian actress
- Edmund Hollings (1556?–1612), English physician
- Ernest Hollings (1922–2019), American politician
- John Hollings (1683?–1739), English physician
- Kenneth Hollings (1918–2008), British judge
- Tony Hollings (born 1981), American football player

== See also ==
- Holling (disambiguation)
- Hollings Center, international relations organization
