= Frances Bradley =

Frances Bradley may refer to:

- Frances Sage Bradley (1862–1949), American physician
- Caroline Bradley (1946–1983), British show-jumper
- Ruth Bradley Holmes (1924–2021), American educator
