= BCLS =

BCLS may refer to:

== Libraries ==
- Bartow County Library System in Bartow County, Georgia
- Bay County Library System in Bay County, Michigan
- Burlington County Library in Burlington County, New Jersey

== Misc. ==
- BC Liquor Stores, a chain of liquor stores servicing British Columbia
