= Ira Yale Sage =

Railroad entrepreneur (1848–1908)

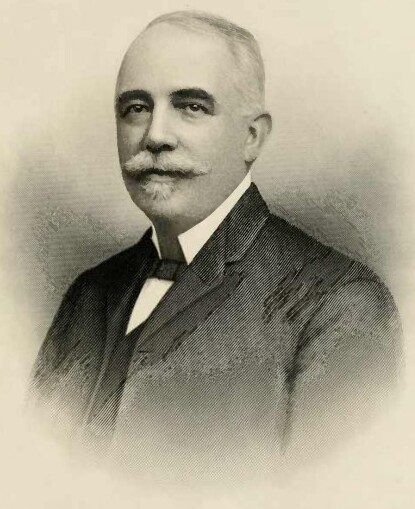
Portrait of Colonel Ira Yale Sage, men of mark, Georgia

Colonel Ira Yale Sage (1848 – 1908) was an American civil engineer, railroad magnate, promoter, and former United States Army officer in Georgia, who became President of the Atlanta and Florida Railway. He was an early investor in the Southern Pacific Railroad and built its first line from Charlotte to Birmingham. Following the end of the American Civil War, he was the railroad engineer responsible for the construction of the tracks running from Atlanta to Washington D.C. He also built the Sage Hill estate and became a member of the Social Register.

Notably, he was a member of the Yale family, benefactors of Yale University, and a cousin of Congressman Russell Sage, who helped organizing America's railroad and telegraph systems, leaving a fortune of about 70 million dollars at his death in 1906.

== Early life ==
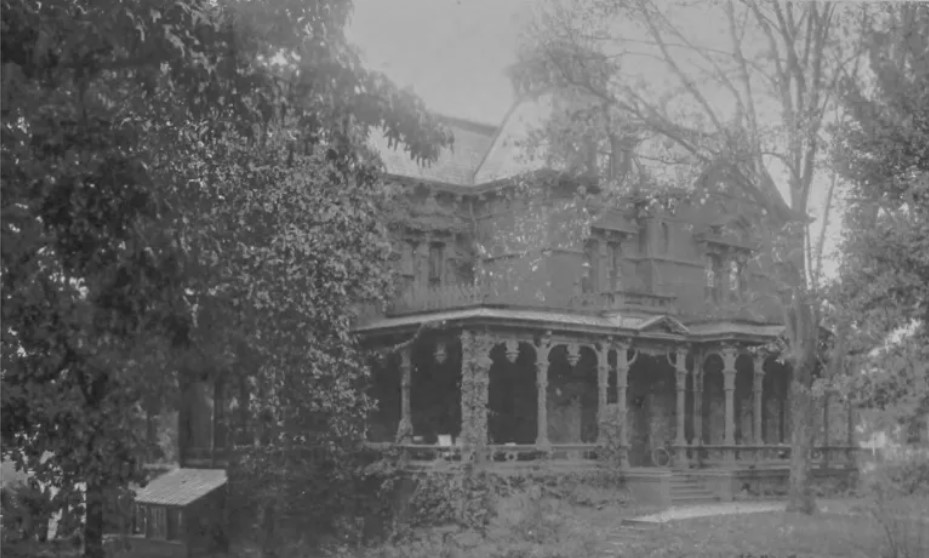
Col. Sage's second home on Peachtree Street, Atlanta

Col. Yale Sage was born at Middletown, Connecticut, on April 4, 1848, to Barzillai Doud Sage, son of Barzillai Sage, and Elizabeth Betsey Yale, members of the Sage and Yale family. He was the brother of Colonel Barzillai Yale Sage, also a railroad builder, and the uncle of Dr. Frances Sage Bradley of the American Red Cross.

His family was of English, Welsh and Norman ancestry, and his ancestor, David Sage, was among the first settlers of Middletown in Connecticut. From his mother's side, he was a descendant of Capt. Thomas Yale, one of the founders of New Haven, Connecticut, and uncle of Elihu Yale, benefactor of Yale College. He was a cousin Dr. Leroy Milton Yale Jr., and tin ware manufacturer Burrage Yale of Lamson, Goodnow & Yale, family of Linus Yale Sr., and was distantly related to abolotionist Barnabas Yale.

Col. Yale Sage was also a cousin of Congressman Russell Sage, husband of philanthropist Margaret Olivia Slocum Sage of the Russell Sage Foundation. Congressman Sage was a railroad magnate, business partner of robber barron Jay Gould during the Gilded Age, and among the richest men in the United States at the time, leaving a fortune of 70 million dollars in 1906, about the same as J.P. Morgan who died 7 years later.

Through the family of his grandfather Barzillai Sage, Col. Yale Sage's distant cousins included Princess Kay Sage, Admiral Francis M. Bunce, Cornell benefactor Henry W. Sage, and Senators Henry M. Sage and Josiah B. Williams.

Princess Kay Sage, a member of American royalty, was related by marriage to the Agnelli family, founders of Fiat S.p.A. and owners of Ferrari, with family members including Donna Virginia Bourbon del Monte, Princess Clara von Fürstenberg, Senator Giovanni Agnelli, minister Susanna Agnelli, and Italy's richest man, Gianni Agnelli of Villa La Leopolda. The Sages, early benefactors of Cornell University, also built Sage Hall at Yale University, and Sage Library, Sage Hall and Sage Chapel at Cornell, where Henry W. Sage was buried along with Ezra Cornell and Andrew Dickson White.

== Biography ==
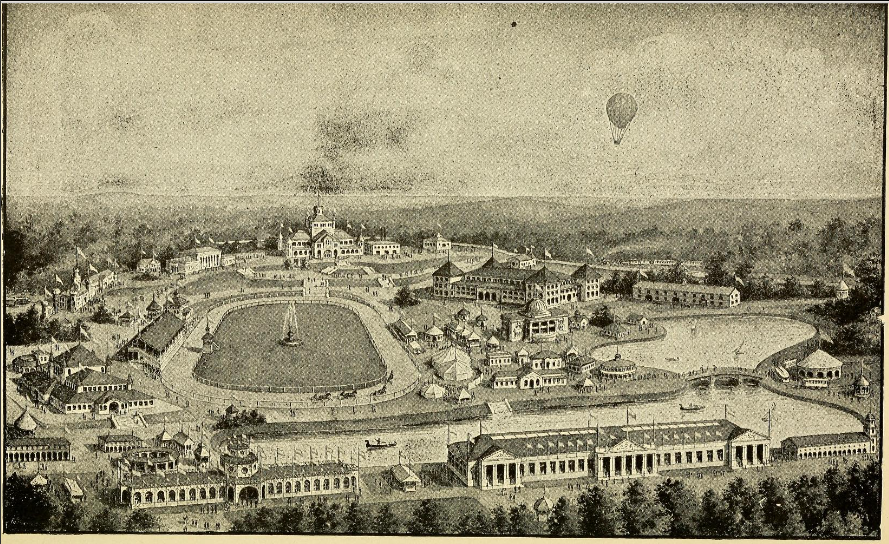
Cotton States and International Exposition of 1895 in Atlanta, Georgia, Col. Sage built the exposition's electric railway

Col. Sage possessed an early aptitude for mathematics, which allowed him to complete algebra and geometry at age 13, and calculus at 14, and after graduating from college, went on working as a civil engineer. At a young age, he came under the personal tutelage and supervision of bridge builder John A. Roebling, who designed the Niagara Falls Suspension Bridge and the Brooklyn Bridge in New York.

At 17, Sage became the chief engineer of the New York, New Haven and Hartford Railroad, and was made assistant engineer of the Georgia Air Line Railroad from 1866 to 1867, acting city engineer of Middletown, Connecticut, and assistant engineer in 1868 of the New Haven, Middletown & Willimantic and Harford Railroad and of the Connecticut Valley Railroad.

Following the industrial boom in the South after the end of the American Civil War, he went to Atlanta, Georgia, in 1868, and became at age 22, the chief engineer of the Richmond and Danville Air Line. He was the railroad engineer responsible for the construction of the tracks running from Atlanta to Washington D.C.

From 1869 to 1872, he was the locating engineer of the Atlanta & Richmond Air Line, and in 1873, of the Elberton Air Line, Atlanta & Roswell, Rome & Raleigh Gainesville & Southern railroads. In 1873, Col. Yale Sage met with Colonel Alexander, T. S. Garner, and a few other directors of the Gainesville, Jefferson and Southern Railroad. They decided to build a railroad together, issuing $125,000 worth of stock on a total of $350,000 and Yale Sage was elected its president and chief engineer.

From 1874 to 1880, he was the chief engineer of construction and repairs of the Atlanta & Charlotte Air Line railroad, of Rabun Gap Short Line from Knoxville to Charleston, and was made division superintendent. He later became the general superintendent of this line, and before reaching 30 years of age, became the general manager of the Georgia Pacific Railway, which became part of the Southern Railway network.

== Later life ==
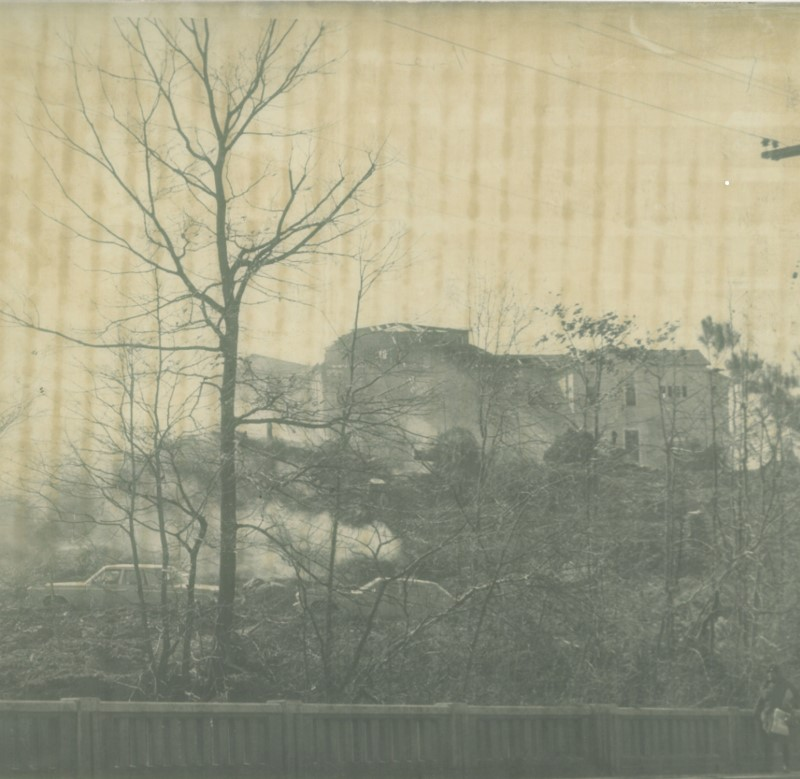
The remains of "Sage Hill House" after a fire, summer residence of Col. Sage in Atlanta

In 1890, he started his own railroad construction enterprise, building the Belt Line around Atlanta for the Seaboard Air Line Railroad, and the Florida Central and Peninsular Railway from Jacksonville to Savannah. He worked as a special consultant with various railroads throughout the southeast. Some of his work involved designing tunnels through mountains, making sure railroad grades were flat enough for locomotives to pull cars up or down them.

He became President of the Atlanta and Florida Railway from 1891 to 1893, which was later sold the Southern Railway in 1895. In 1894, he built the 27 room "Sage Hill House" in Atlanta; the largest residence in DeKalb County, Georgia at the time. They later sold Sage Hill to the Hochs and moved into the Kimball House Hotel. The home later burned, was demolished, and became Sage Hill shopping center.

In 1895, Sage obtained the contract for the construction and operation of the electric railway of the Cotton States and International Exposition in Atlanta, becoming as a result president of the Dixie Intramural Railway Company and built a power plant.

Toward the end of his life, he became president of the Georgia Manufacturing and Realty Company, vice-president of the Southern States Life Insurance Company, and board director and member of the finance committee of the Central Bank and Trust, a bank founded by Asa Griggs Candler, cofounder of Coca Cola Company.

Sage was also an early investor in the Southern Pacific Railroad, which became a major railroad system, incorporating railroads such as the Texas and New Orleans Railroad of shipping magnate Charles Morgan. His son Ira Yale Jr. would inherit his fortune, but later lost it during the Wall Street crash of 1929, making his daughters chasing an acting career in Hollywood, in the hope of winning back the family fortune.

Col. Yale Sage died on November 14, 1908, and was buried in the Sage family mausoleum at Oakland Cemetery in Atlanta, Georgia. With his wife Margaret, he was a member of the Social Register of Atlanta, and noted as a well-known railroad builder.

== Children ==
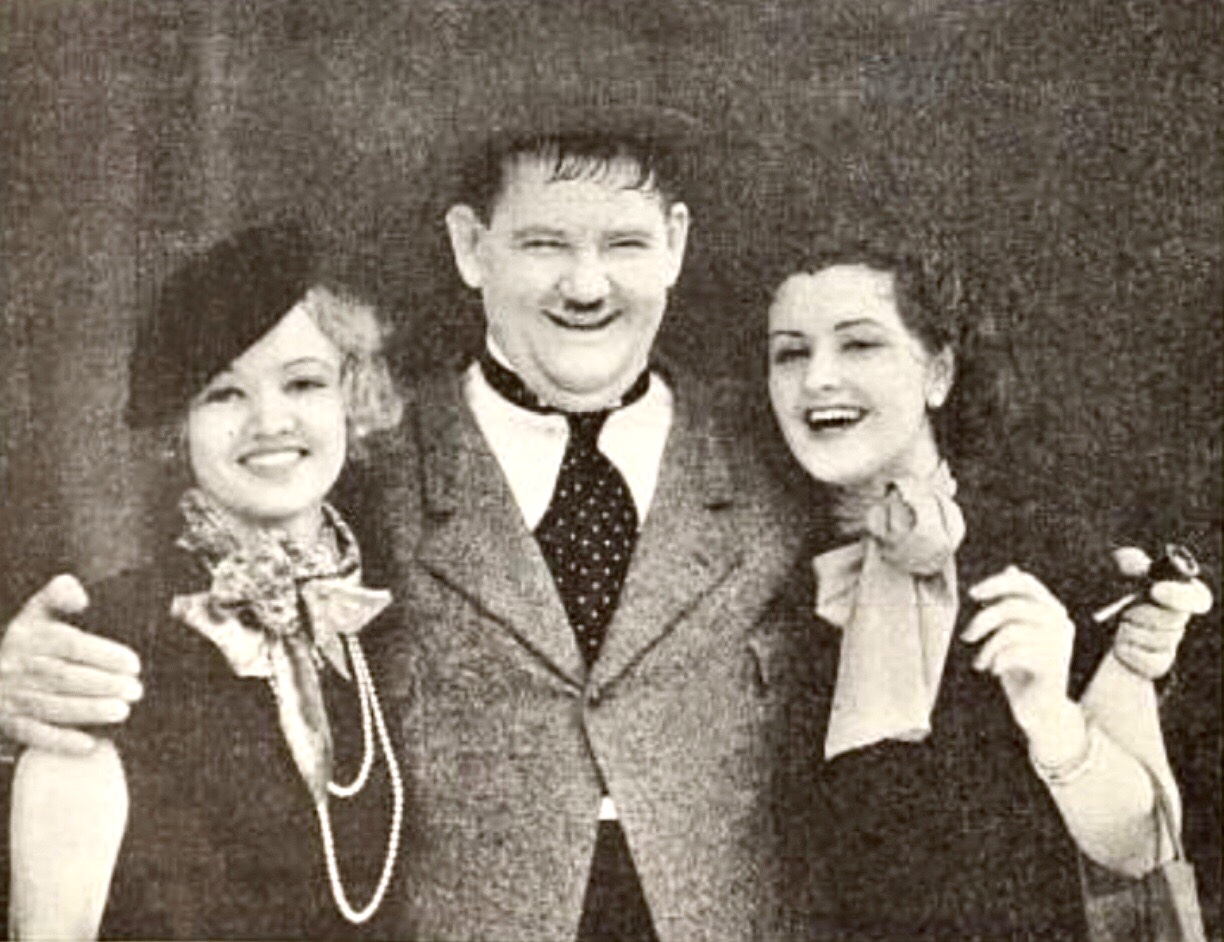
Actor Oliver Hardy with his nieces Mary and Margot Sage from The Live Ghost, granddaughters of Col. Yale Sage

Col. Yale Sage married January 3, 1871, to Margaret Alexander, of the Alexander and Byrd family of North Carolina and Virginia. His wife was a Colonial Dame and a Daughter of the American Revolution, being vice-president of the National Society of the Daughters of the American Revolution.

Her ancestors, the Byrds, were the founders of Richmond, Virginia, owning about 180,000 acres of land, and the Alexanders were among the leaders and signatories of the Mecklenburg Declaration of Independence during the American Revolution, including chairman Abraham Alexander.

They had three children together :

- Ira Yale Sage Jr. (1874–1950), attorney-at-law
- Charlotte Sage (1878–1880), died young
- Herbert Alexander Sage (1881–1955), attorney-at-law

Col. Sage's granddaughters Mary and Margot Sage were actresses in Hollywood, being featured in the film The Live Ghost. The Sage sisters were also featured in The Bohemian Girl and Our Relations, along with their uncle Oliver Hardy. Hardy was a member of the Laurel and Hardy duo, a coworker of Charlie Chaplin, and a member of the Classical Hollywood cinema era.
