= James Mackenzie (physician, died 1761) =

Scottish physician

- Born: 1680?
- Died: 7 August 1761
- Occupation: Physician

James Mackenzie (1680? – 7 August 1761) was a Scottish physician.

== Biography ==
James Mackenzie was born about 1680. He was educated at Edinburgh University, was entered at the university of Leyden 15 March 1700 (Leyden Students, p. 64), and was subsequently elected a fellow of the Royal College of Physicians at Edinburgh. He practised for many years in Worcester 'with nigh reputation and success,' and he gained many learned and influential friends, including L. M. da Costa [q. v.] and Lady Mary Wortley Montagu. In 1745, he was consulted, together with Philip Doddrige by Isaac Maddox, then bishop of Worcester, respecting the foundation of Worcester Infirmary, and he was attending physician at that institution from its establishment until his retirement from practice in 1751, when he settled in Kidderminster. The bishop wrote him an affectionate letter as a stimulus 'to usefulness, even in retirement,' and in 1758 he responded by producing 'The History of Health and the Art of Preserving it,' Edinburgh, 8vo, dedicated to the bishop, commencing with a succinct account of man's food before the fall, and containing summaries of the general rules of health laid down by eminent physicians from Moses onwards. There are some curious notes on British writers on health, including Sir Thomas Elyot, Thomas Morgan (CoganP), Edmund Hollyngs, William Vaughan, Thomas Venner, Edward Maynwaring, Thomas Phaer, William Bullein, and lastly, John Arbuthnot and Richard Mead. A third edition appeared also at Edinburgh in 1760, bearing fruits of Mackenzie's friendship with the Wortley Montagus in the shape of an appendix, containing 'A Short and Clear Account of the Commencement, Progress, Utility, and Proper Management of Inoculating the Small Pox as a valuable branch of Prophylaxis'. A French translation had appeared at the Hague in 1759. Mackenzie also wrote 'Essays and Meditations on Various Subjects,' a pious volume published posthumously at Edinburgh in 1762, and he contributed 'History of a Complete Luxation of the Thigh' to 'Essays and Observations, Physical and Literary' (1756, ii. 817). James Mackenzie died at Sutton Coldfield, Warwickshire, on 7 August 1761.
