= Holling =

Holling may refer to:

- Holling (surname)
- Holling Vincoeur, fictional character in the 1990s television show Northern Exposure
- Holling Hoodhood, fictional character in the 2007 children's historical novel The Wednesday Wars by Gary D. Schmidt
- Holling, Moselle, commune in France

== See also ==
- Hollings
- Holly, origin of "holling"
- Hollingshead (disambiguation)
- Hollingsworth
- Holl (disambiguation)
