= Central Bank and Trust (Atlanta) =

The Central Bank and Trust Corp. was a bank founded in 1906 by Coca-Cola co-founder Asa Griggs Candler. It had its headquarters in the Candler Building in Downtown Atlanta. In 1922 it was merged into Citizens & Southern National Bank, the present successor entity to which is the Bank of America. One of its past directors was Col. Ira Yale Sage.
