= Marion L. Bugbee =

American physician

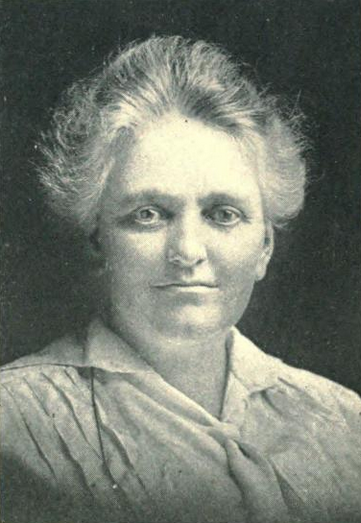
- Marion L. Bugbee, from a 1919 publication
- Born: September 2, 1871; Hartford, Vermont
- Died: February 3, 1950 (aged 78); Brattleboro Retreat, White River Junction, Vermont
- Occupation: Physician

Marion Louise (or Lewis) Bugbee (September 2, 1871 – February 3, 1950) was an American physician and suffragist.

== Early life and education ==
Bugbee was born in Hartford, Vermont, a daughter of Jonathan Bugbee and Ellen Adeline (Lewis) Bugbee. Her father was a wheelwright. She attended Tilden Seminary and earned her medical degree from the Woman's Medical College of the New York Infirmary in 1897.

== Career ==
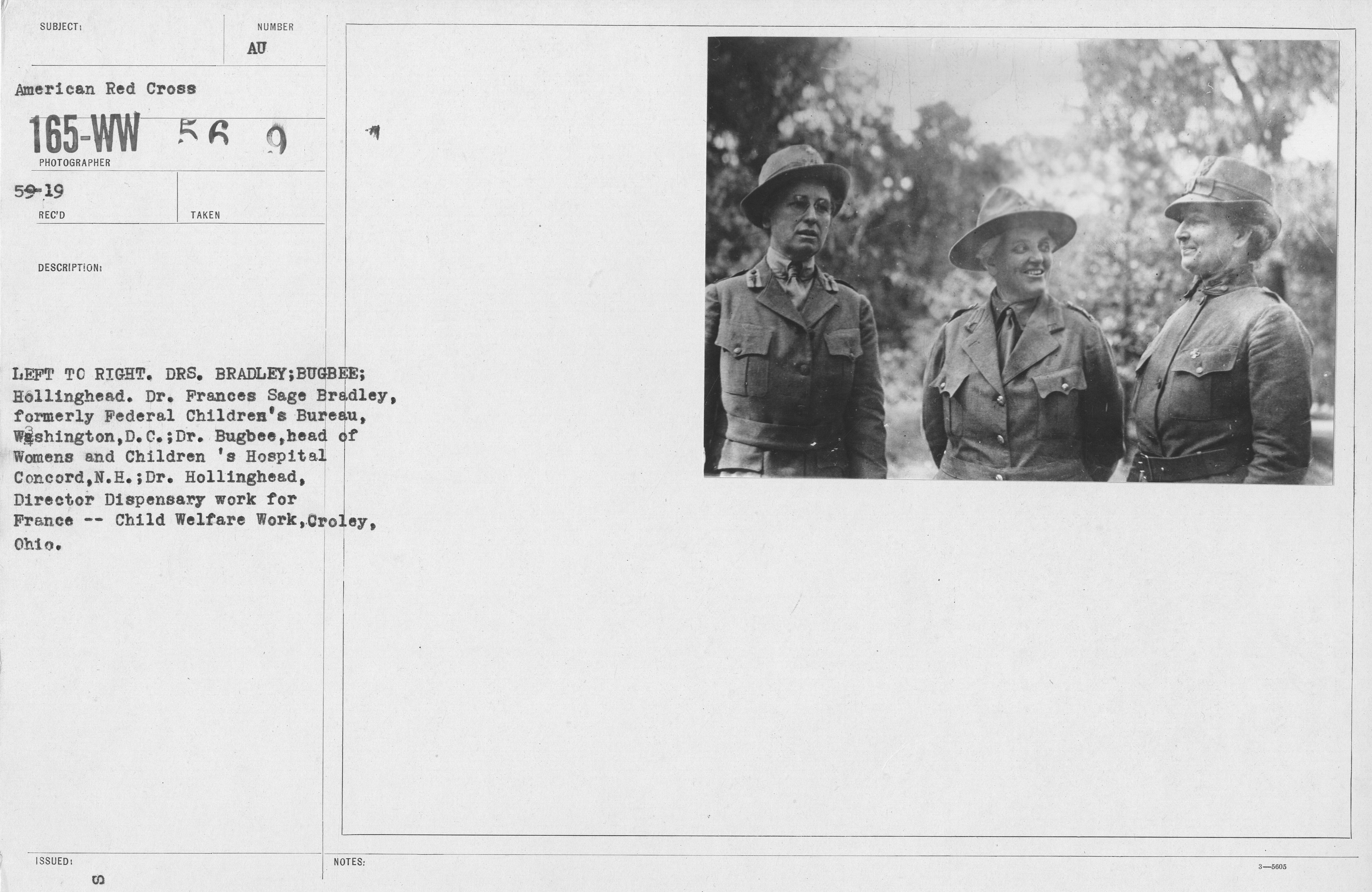
American Red Cross medical personnel in France during World War I, including (left to right) Frances Sage Bradley, Marion L. Bugbee, and Frances M. Hollingshead

Bugbee practiced in Hartford, Vermont from 1898 to 1909. She was an anesthetist and pediatrician by specialties, She succeeded Julia Wallace-Russell as physician in charge at the New Hampshire Memorial Hospital for Women and Children, a post she held from 1909 to 1931. She took a leave from her hospital duties to go to France with the American Red Cross during World War I. She practiced in White River Junction, Vermont from 1931 until health issues including a hip fracture led to her retirement in the mid-1940s.

Bugbee was an active clubwoman, and a member of the Daughters of the American Revolution. She chaired the public health committee of the New Hampshire Federation of Women's Clubs, and was a councillor of the American Medical Women's National Association. She was also involved in the Concord Equal Suffrage League.

== Publications ==
- "Sequence of Diphtheria Cases" (1904)
- "Acute Infectious Jaundice: A Report of Three Cases" (1908)

== Personal life ==
Bugbee lived for more than two decades with Mary Elizabeth Silver (1863–1960), who was a nurse. Silver was mentioned in Bugbee's obituary as a survivor, "her constant companion for many years, both in Concord and White River". Bugbee died at Brattleboro Retreat in Brattleboro, Vermont in 1950, at the age of 78.
