= Holling (surname) =

Holling is a surname. Notable people with the surname include:

- Carl Holling (1896–1962), American baseball player
- C. S. Holling (1930 - 2019), Canadian ecologist
- Holling C. Holling (1900–1973), American illustrator
- Thomas L. Holling (1889–1966), American politician

== See also ==
- Hollings
