= The Live Ghost =

- Directed by: Charles Rogers
- Produced by: Hal Roach
- Starring: Stan Laurel; Oliver Hardy; Walter Long; Arthur Housman; Mae Busch
- Cinematography: Art Lloyd
- Edited by: Louis McManus
- Music by: Marvin Hatley; Irving Berlin; Arthur Kay; LeRoy Shield
- Distributed by: Metro-Goldwyn-Mayer
- Release date: December 8, 1934
- Running time: 00:20:50
- Country: United States
- Language: English

The Live Ghost is a 1934 American comedy short film starring Laurel and Hardy, directed by Charles Rogers, and produced by Hal Roach at his studios in Culver City, California.

Copies of this short are preserved on 16mm and 35mm safety film, on videotape, or in digital formats at various libraries and motion picture repositories in the United States, including in the Film and Sound Collection at the Library of Congress, the UCLA Film & Television Archive, and at the George Eastman Museum.

== Plot ==
A gruff sea captain grapples with the impediment of recruiting sailors owing to his vessel's ill-reputed status as haunted, which dissuades potential enlistment. A fortuitous encounter unfolds as the captain intersects with Stan and Ollie during a tranquil fishing outing. Despite the captain's entreaties, Stan and Ollie demur from maritime service, attributing their reluctance to an aversion towards the ocean, predicated upon its purportedly shark-infested waters.

Undeterred by their initial refusal, the captain formulates an alternative plan, enlisting Stan and Ollie's assistance in the practice of shanghaiing. Leveraging their unwitting cooperation, the captain orchestrates the forcible abduction of an inebriated crew from a local tavern, subsequently incorporating Stan and Ollie into the ranks of the conscripted.

As the vessel embarks on its voyage, tensions burgeon among the coerced sailors, apprehensive of their coerced predicament, prompting a confrontation with Stan and Ollie. However, the captain, portrayed as a commanding figure, intercedes to assuage the unrest, exerting his authority to restore order and enforce discipline. And he vows that the next person who says the word "ghost" will have his head twisted around "so that when he's walking North he'll be looking South!"

Upon reaching a distant port, the captain authorizes shore leave for the crew, yet Stan and Ollie elect to remain aboard, harboring apprehensions concerning their safety. The narrative crescendos with the revelation of the purported "ghost" as the captain's inebriated first mate, whose misadventures culminate in his expulsion from the vessel at the behest of a scorned former lover. Stan and Ollie make the mistake of saying "We Just Saw A GHost!!"---and the Captain keeps his word on the neck-twisting.

== Cast ==
Credited:

- Stan Laurel as Stan
- Oliver Hardy as Ollie
- Walter Long as the captain
- Mae Busch as Maisie, the floozie
- Arthur Housman as the drunk "ghost" sailor

Uncredited:

- Harry Bernard as Joe, the bartender
- Leo Willis, first sailor knocked out by Ollie with frying pan
- John Power, second sailor knocked out by Ollie
- Hubert Diltz, third sailor knocked out by Ollie
- Charlie Hall, last sailor knocked out by Stan with frying pan
- Dick Gilbert shanghaied sailor aboard ship
- Art Rowlands, sailor with eye patch aboard ship
- Margot Sage, bar patron
- Mary Sage, bar patron

== Production ==
The principal writer of this short's screenplay is not credited on screen, although IMDb, the website for Turner Classic Movies, and various other online and printed references attribute the script to Harley M. Walker. Walker, though, who began work at Hal Roach Studios in 1916, resigned from the company in July 1932, more than two years before this two-reeler's production began. Also, while the former sports columnist had distinguished himself at Roach Studios as an excellent and prolific writer of intertitles during the silent era, Walker's contributions to scripts or "dialogue" were comparatively minor at the film company with the advent of sound. Opening screen credits for Laurel and Hardy short subjects after Walker's departure usually include no specific writer identification.

The scenes and dialogue that comprise The Live Ghost were likely the products of a collaborative effort by Hal Roach himself, Stan Laurel, and one or more of the studio's team of "gag writers". It also appears that elements of the production's storyline were an adaptation or "reworking" of the 1915 silent short Shanghaied, which was produced by Jess Robbins for Essanay Studios and stars Charlie Chaplin. Yet, despite any ambiguities regarding the principal author of The Live Ghost or any perceived similarities to earlier films, available sources generally agree that this short's script was drafted, revised, and finalized between late October 1934 and the first week in November.

=== Changes to the script ===
According to Laurel-and-Hardy biographer Randy Skretvedt, the short's final shooting script and filming setups were the end-products of substantial changes to the initial screenplay, most notably to the scenes in which the comedy duo first appear on screen and meet the captain of the "ghost ship". Skretvedt examined years of production records of Hal Roach Studios for his 1987 book Laurel and Hardy: The Magic Behind the Movies, and he also conducted extensive interviews with former Roach executives and with cast and crew who were directly involved in the development and filming of The Live Ghost. Those sources document far different original content for the noted scenes and in other portions of the short. Mae Busch's role as Maisie, for example, was not in the film's original storyline, and Skretvedt describes how Ollie and Stan in the original script were not simply enjoying some "recreation" when the captain initially encounters them:

The Live Ghost underwent quite a transformation in its trip from paper to film. The written outline was even more morbid than the film: as the movie opens, the boys are fishing on the dock on their day off; in the script, they were there to commit suicide.
They stand at the edge of the dock. Stan is tying a large rock to the center of a piece of rope; with one end, he ties a slip knot around Ollie’s neck. Ollie reacts and growls, "Not so tight! Do you want to kill me?" Stan picks up the rock and swings it back and forth, about to throw it in the water. As he counts, "One—two—," Ollie stops him.
...Ollie gives him a dirty look, then ties the other end of the rope around Stan's neck. He picks up the rock and starts swinging it back and forth again, but this time Stan stops him. Ollie sets the rock down; Stan reaches out to shake his hand....
The would-be suicides close their eyes, reach down, and pick up the rock—only it's another rock that's been placed conveniently nearby. The captain enters, and watches as the boys throw the rock into the water. All three are drenched with a mighty splash. The captain convinces Stan and Ollie that instead of taking a trip to the great beyond, they should take a trip on his ship—along with a crew he'll pay them to recruit. Stan loosens the rope from his neck, and takes off his coat—revealing a life preserver around his waist.

=== Filming ===
Filming at Hal Roach Studios in Culver City began immediately after the script's final revision and required only a week to shoot, "wrapping up" by November 14, 1934. That schedule provided the company a little over three weeks to edit the footage, adjust and supplement the short's soundtrack, produce the necessary supply of finished copies, and ship them to designated theaters across the country before the comedy's official release on December 8.

=== Oliver Hardy's nieces working as extras ===
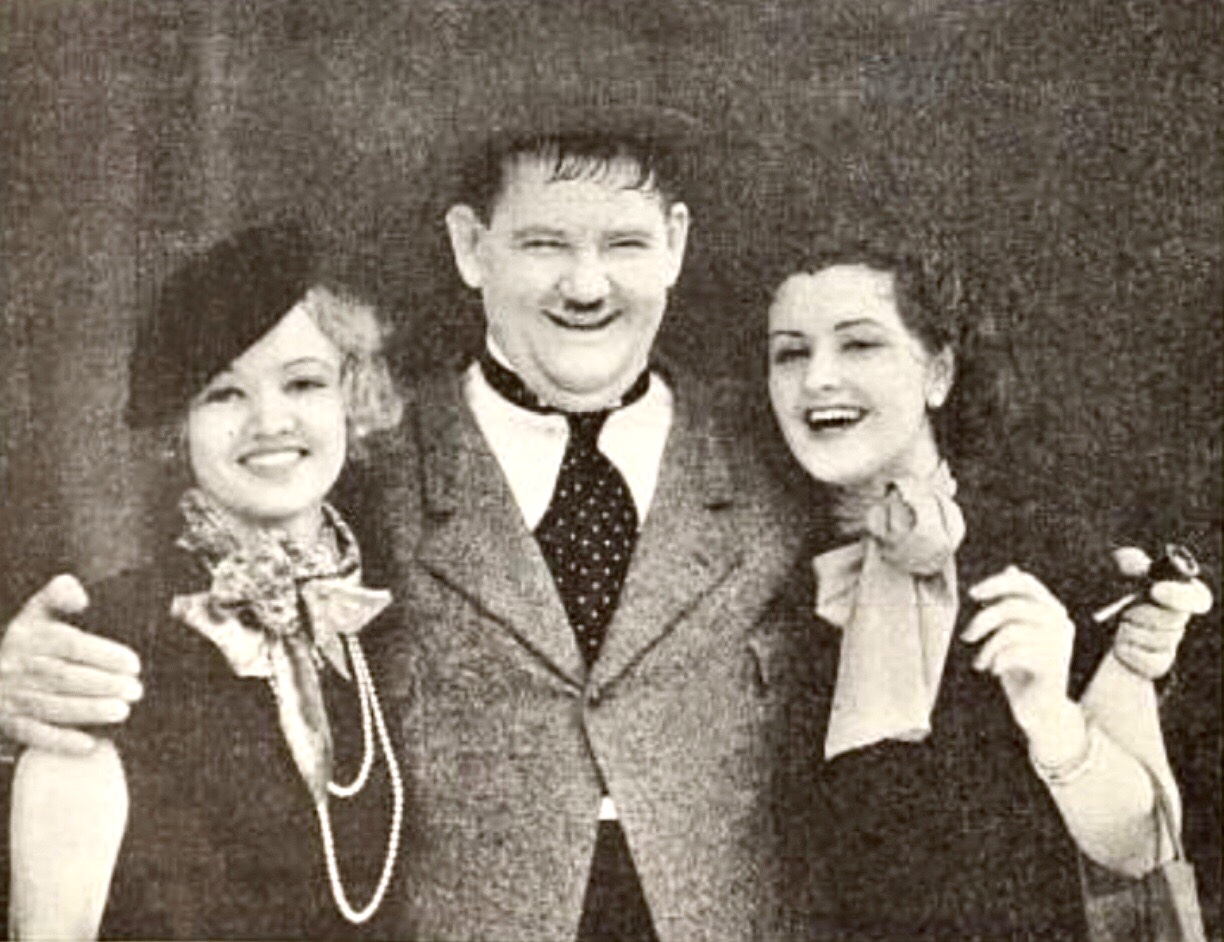
Oliver Hardy with his nieces Mary Sage (left) and Margot Sage in their attire as extras in The Live Ghost (1934)

Two of Oliver Hardy's nieces, Margaret ("Margot") Yale Sage and Mary Norvell Sage, appear as extras in The Live Ghost. Natives of Georgia and former Atlanta debutantes, the 22-year-old twin sisters were the daughters of Hardy's half-sister Elizabeth (née Tante) and her husband Ira Yale Sage, Jr., son of Colonel Ira Yale Sage. (Note: Some 1934 newspaper items, such as that year's October 26 issue of The Brownsville Herald, which is cited herein, describe the twin sisters being 19 years old at that time, although cemetery and government records, confirm the women's birthdate as June 30, 1912, making them actually 22 years old during this film's production. Refer to "United States Social Security Death Index" database for Margaret Y[ale] Sage, U.S. Social Security Administration, death date April 1, 1992; compiled and maintained by the National Technical Information Service, Alexandria, Virginia. Retrieved online via FamilySearch subscription service, Salt Lake City Utah, March 20, 2023.) (Note: Margaret (Margot) Sage and Mary (née Sage) Adcock's father was a descendant of Elihu Yale, the wealthy philanthropist who was the primary donor in funding the establishment of Yale College (now Yale University) in Connecticut in 1701. The bulk of Ira Sage's own fortune, which was built upon his father's financial success as a developer and investor in the Southern Pacific Railroad, was lost in the stock market crash of 1929. Five years later, his daughters' efforts to establish acting careers in Hollywood were motivated in part by their hopes to help regain the Sage family's lost fortune. See the newspaper articles "Bring Tall Family Tree to Films" in The Waterbury Democrat (Waterbury, Connecticut), November 7, 1934, p. 7, and the "Sage Twins Turn Breadwinners" in The Brownsville Herald (Brownsville, Texas), October 26, 1934, p. 10.) In 1934, weeks before filming began on the short, the young women left Georgia and traveled to Los Angeles, California to visit their famous uncle and, according to news reports at the time, were "determined to crash the pictures" and achieve "film stardom". During the sisters' extended stay in California, Oliver arranged to have them perform in "minor walk-on roles" in this film and in some others at Hal Roach Studios.

Margot can be seen in the short's opening scene. She is the brunette, attired in a black beret and dark dress, exiting alone from "The Crow's Nest" bar. In the next scene, set in that bar's interior crowded with customers, Margot is sitting at a table and drinking a mug of beer behind two men playing pool in the foreground. (Note: Margot Sage can also be seen as an extra in the 1934 Laurel and Hardy film Babes in Toyland, which was also produced by Hal Roach Studios and distributed by MGM on November 30 that year, only eight days before the release of The Live Ghost. See a news item about the nieces in the November 9, 1934 issue of The Film Daily, p. 6; available through Internet Archive.) Her sister Mary—a blonde also wearing a black beret and dark dress—is at the adjacent table. Later in the same bar scene, Mary can be seen again seated at a table in the background with several other bar patrons, including actor Charlie Hall's character.

== Reception ==
In the weeks after its release, the film received generally positive reviews from movie critics as well as from theater owners and their customers. Clifford M. Anderson, the owner of the Lamar Theatre in Lohrville, Iowa, reported on his audiences' response to the short in the trade journal Motion Picture Herald. "We thought this one better than the run of Laurel and Hardys", Anderson writes in the Herald's January 19, 1935 issue, "Patrons ate it up." The popular American trade magazine Boxoffice reviewed the short the day of its release in 1934, rating it an "'A-1 comedy'" with "'good old-fashioned slapstick'" and laughs "'that come fast and often during the scenes aboard a haunted ship.'" The Film Daily, another widely read trade paper at the time, rates the short "Very Good" in its January 15, 1935 issue, noting that "the hilarity rises high when a souse, played with good effect by Arthur Housman...falls into a trough of whitewash and is taken for a ghost by the comedians." "Direction is excellent", remarks Variety in its January 22, 1935 issue. That New York-based trade paper, another leading source of news and advertising in the American entertainment industry, then sums up the two-reeler in just nine words in that same issue: "Very comical short, meaty on both ideas and laughs."

=== Later assessments of the film ===
English-American archivist and film historian William K. Everson describes the short's plot as "more than a little contrived" in his 1967 reference The Complete Films of Laurel & Hardy; nevertheless, he contends that it provided Stan and Ollie opportunities to perform "some exceptionally good individual sequences". Everson also states that the production's cinematography was "carefully executed" in portraying the "sleazy waterfront saloon and mist-shrouded ghost ship" and, in his view, is superior to the camerawork used in the comedy team's later shorts.

In Randy Skretvedt's previously noted 1987 book Laurel and Hardy: The Magic Behind the Movies, the biographer deems The Live Ghost as "perhaps the best of the L&H horror comedies" Film historian Glenn Mitchell, the author of the 1995 reference The Laurel & Hardy Encyclopedia, also ranks the short among his "favourite" Stan and Ollie shorts, characterizing it as "complex in plot but concise in execution." In his overall assessment of the film, Mitchell, like Everson, draws special attention to the quality of the production's moody environments and to the effective performances of its supporting cast members:

Very atmospheric, aided by detailed sets and judiciously-placed mist, the film presents their stock company at its best while offering Laurel & Hardy a pleasant blend of visual humour and some memorable dialogue. Mae Busch..., the movies' perennial streetwalker, for once is presented in such a role without a shred of ambiguity, while Arthur Housman and Walter Long...are seen to best advantage. The contrived notion of falling into whitewash is rendered credible by Housman's skill, while the aggrieved Captain is Long at his roguish best.

Jonathan Sanders, however, another researcher and writer about Laurel and Hardy films, ranks The Live Ghost as "probably the weakest of all" of the duo's horror-comedies, one that he deems "childish" in its overall composition. In his 1995 book Another Fine Dress: Role-Play in the Films of Laurel and Hardy, Sanders contends that the two-reeler marks an "artistic decline" within this specific area of the comedy team's motion picture catalog. "Horror", he writes, "plays no part in the first half", while he continues, "The second half resorts to various plot contrivances to produce the 'live ghost'...which in turn gives rise to the frantic mugging and running around seen in the team's earlier efforts in this genre."
