= Michael Hollingshead =

British researcher

Michael Hollingshead (30 September 1931 – 1984) was a British researcher who studied psychedelic drugs, including psilocybin and LSD, at Harvard University in the mid-20th century. He was the father of comedian Vanessa Hollingshead. He evangelized the use of LSD to many notable figures.

== Biography ==
Born Michael Shinkfield in Darlington 30 September 1931, he was the son of William Ewart Gladstone Shinkfield, a colliery clerk and his wife Edith née Ridehaugh, from Harrogate.

Hollingshead was the Executive Secretary for the Institute of British-American Cultural Exchange in 1961. Dr. John Beresford, a research scientist, received a package of one gram of LSD from Sandoz Laboratories in Switzerland at a time when it was still legal to experiment with it. Beresford, in turn, gave part of the gram to Hollingshead. One of Hollingshead's experiments studied the effects on web-weaving by spiders under the influence of the drug.

Hollingshead claims to have first tried LSD by licking the spoon of a batch of LSD-laced cake icing he had packed in a mayonnaise jar for transport. (This jar was to become the object of psychedelic legend.) Following this first experience, Hollingshead contacted Aldous Huxley, who suggested he get in contact with Timothy Leary to discuss the potential of the drug. In September 1961, Hollingshead met Leary in Cambridge, Massachusetts, and was invited to live in the latter's house and teach a course at Harvard. Shortly thereafter, he introduced Leary to LSD.

Hollingshead participated in the Concord Prison Experiment with Leary, Ralph Metzner, and others in 1962. For the next few years he worked with psychedelic therapists, and lived at Millbrook, New York with Leary and Richard Alpert (a.k.a. Ram Dass). He then set up a New York-based project of his own together with Jean Houston, where guided trips were performed and data gathered which, according to Hollingshead's book, formed the core material for Masters' and Houston's work The Varieties of Psychedelic Experience. In 1965, he moved to London and opened the World Psychedelic Center.

He also worked in experimental film, collaborating on the Scott Bartlett short subject "A Trip to the Moon", in 1968.

Hollingshead was an associate of the Castalia Foundation, a contributor to the Psychedelic Review, and interviewed cult writer Robert Anton Wilson for High Times magazine in 1980.

According to Psychedelia Britannica, Hollingshead died in the early 1980s. In a 2018 interview, Hollingshead's daughter Vanessa said that her father died in Bolivia from a stomach ulcer in 1984.

== Influence ==
Apart from Leary, those Hollingshead is reputed to have introduced to LSD include writers William S. Burroughs and Paul Krassner, comparative religions scholar Huston Smith, philosopher Alan Watts, graphic designer Storm Thorgerson, film director Roman Polanski, poet Allen Ginsberg, businessman-financier Saul Steinberg, musicians Donovan, Keith Richards, Pete LaRoca, Charles Mingus, Maynard Ferguson and Paul McCartney, John Lennon, and George Harrison of the Beatles.

== Bibliography and articles ==
- Hollingshead, Michael & Timothy Leary, George Litwin, Günther Weil, Richard Alpert (1962) The Politics of the Nervous System. - The Bulletin of the Atomic Scientists (1962) by Atomic Scientists of Chicago, Educational Foundation for Nuclear Science (Chicago, Ill.) (response to Psycho Chemicals as Weapons by Dr. E. James Lieberman - January 1962)
- Hollingshead, Michael (1973) The Man Who Turned On the World. Abelard-Schuman Publ. New York (also Blond & Briggs, Ltd.)
- The Sayings of Michael Hollingshead. Blotter magazine Issue #3
- Hollingshead, Michael (1968) Introduction to "Lightshow" Harbinger Magazine (produced by the Oracle staff as their 13th issue and attempted revival of the publication) Harbinger University Press, July 1968. by Michael Hollingshead
- Harris, Lee & Chris Render (1994) Best of Homegrown Red Shift ISBN 0-9524350-0-4 (contributor to anthology of Homegrown magazine)
