= Sage Library =

- U.S. National Register of Historic Places
- Michigan State Historic Site
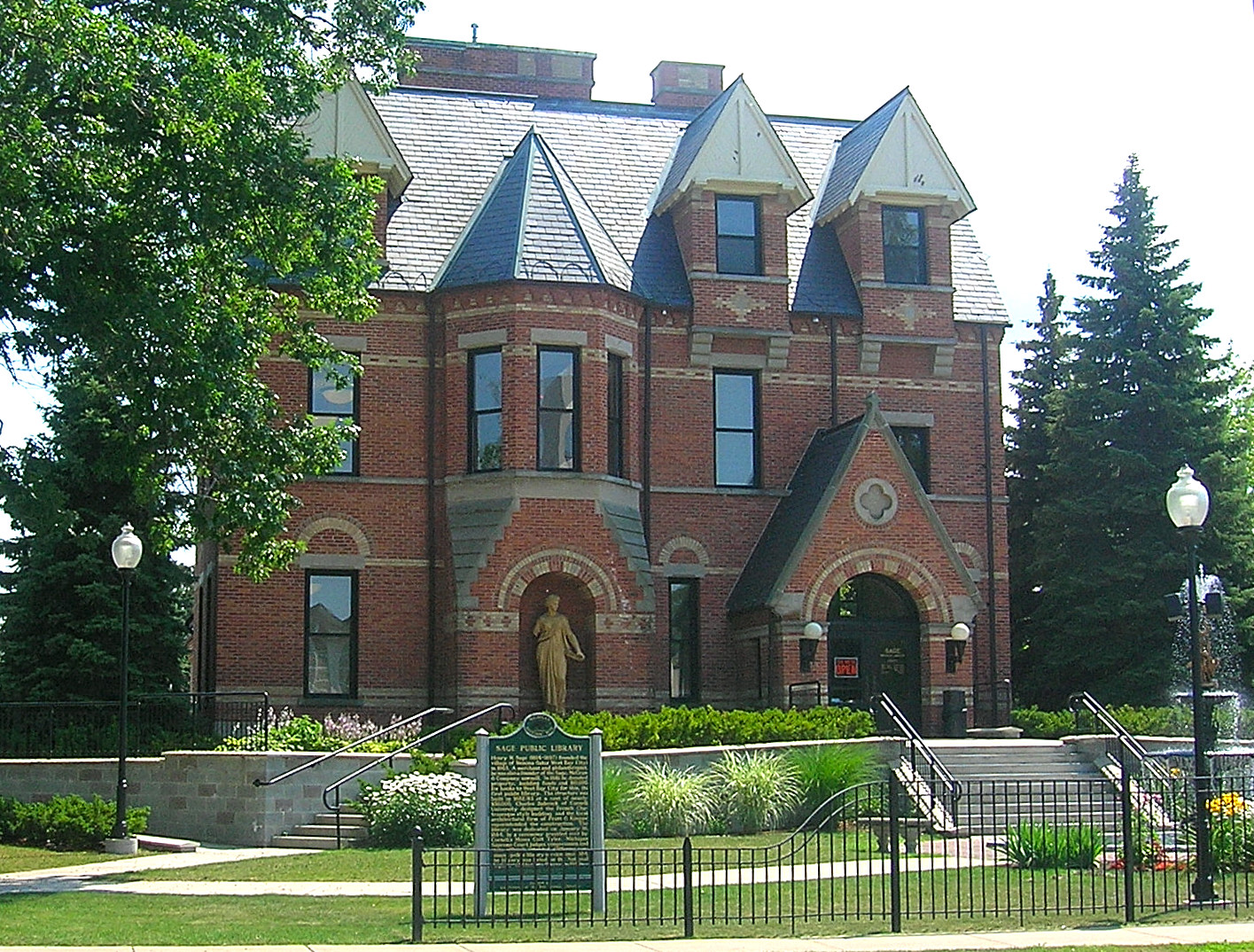

- Location within Michigan Location within the United States
- Interactive map
- Location: 100 E. Midland St., Bay City, Michigan
- Coordinates: 43°36′6″N 83°54′17″W
- Area: 1.3 acres (0.53 ha)
- Built: 1884
- Built by: Andrew Thomson
- Architect: Pratt and Koeppe
- Architectural style: Renaissance, French Châteauesque
- NRHP reference No.: 79001149
- Added to NRHP: December 31, 1979

The Sage Library is a historical structure located on 100 E. Midland St in Bay City, Michigan. The library had its grand opening on January 16, 1884 and was constructed by Henry W. Sage as a gift to Bay City. It is operated as a public library by the Bay County Library System. The building was listed on the National Register of Historic Places in 1979. It is the oldest continually operated library building in the state of Michigan.

== History ==
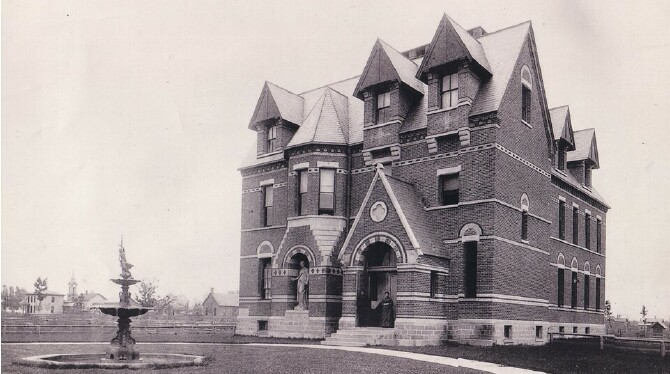
Sage Library, c. 1884

Henry W. Sage and his business partner, John McGraw, arrived in Bay City area in the early 1860s to open a sawmill and lumberyard. They platted a small settlement known then as Wenona, and later West Bay City. Henry Sage was also a generous philanthropist, donating significantly to Cornell University. In 1884, Sage contracted with the area's best known architectural firm, Pratt and Koeppe, to design this library, and hired Andrew Thomson as the contractor to construct it.

When originally built, the library itself occupied only the second floor of the building, and contained 10,000 books. The first floor was used for school classes, and the third floor was used as an office for the Superintendent of Schools. The building also provided meeting space for several societies. When West Bay City and Bay City merged in 1903, the library was incorporated into the Bay City System. The collection housed in the building continued to grow, reaching over 110,000 volumes by the 1970s.

The library underwent major renovations in 1982-84, and the slate roof was replaced in 1990. In 2002-04 an extensive renovation restored many historic features, converted the attic into a library area, and included an addition to the rear of building. The building is still operated as a public library.

== Description ==
The Sage Library is a rectangular, 2-1/2-story, four bay wide red brick building with a multi-colored ashlar fieldstone foundation, and highlighted with pink Amherst stone. The building is designed in a revival version of French Châteauesque architecture, with asymmetrical massing and a steeply pitched hipped roof. The front facade has a projecting entryway covered with a gable roof two bays wide, with a rounded archway and double doors. Next to the entryway is a projecting bay reaching to the roofline; the final bay houses a tall double-hung window unit. On the second floor, the projecting bay holds a tri-sided arrangement of tall double hung window units; the remaining bays hold a simple double-hung sash each. At the roof level, the projecting bay is capped with a tri-sided roof while the remaining bays have dormers.

Inside, the arrangement is the same as when the building first opened. The first floor has an entrance lobby and two large rooms originally serving as schoolrooms. The second floor, reached by a stair in the entry way, is also divided into two large rooms. One of these was the original reading room, and the other housed the collection. The third floor remains was originally unfinished, but has been converted into library space.
