= Frances Sage Bradley =

American physician

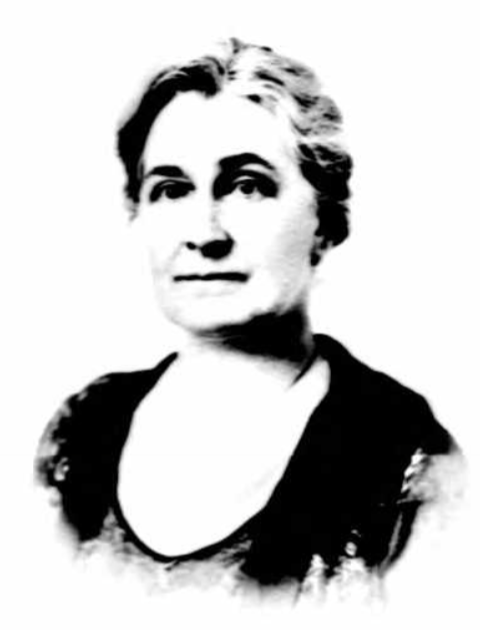
- Frances Sage Bradley, from her 1918 passport application
- Born: August 28, 1862; Fort Gaines, Georgia, Confederate States of America
- Died: February 12, 1949 (aged 86); Washington, D.C., United States of America
- Other name: Fannie Sage
- Occupations: Physician, writer
- Spouse: Horace James Bradley

Frances Sage Bradley (August 28, 1862 – February 12, 1949) was an American physician. She went to France with the American Red Cross during World War I, and held pediatric and maternal health clinics in rural Appalachia, Arkansas, and Montana in the 1910s and 1920s.

== Early life and education ==
Frances Sage was born in Fort Gaines, Georgia, the daughter of Barzillai Yale Sage and Miranda Royce Sage. Her father was a railroad engineer and her uncle was Colonel Ira Yale Sage. In widowhood, with four young children to support, she trained as a physician at the Woman's Medical College of New York and Cornell University School of Medicine, completing her medical degree in 1899.

== Career ==
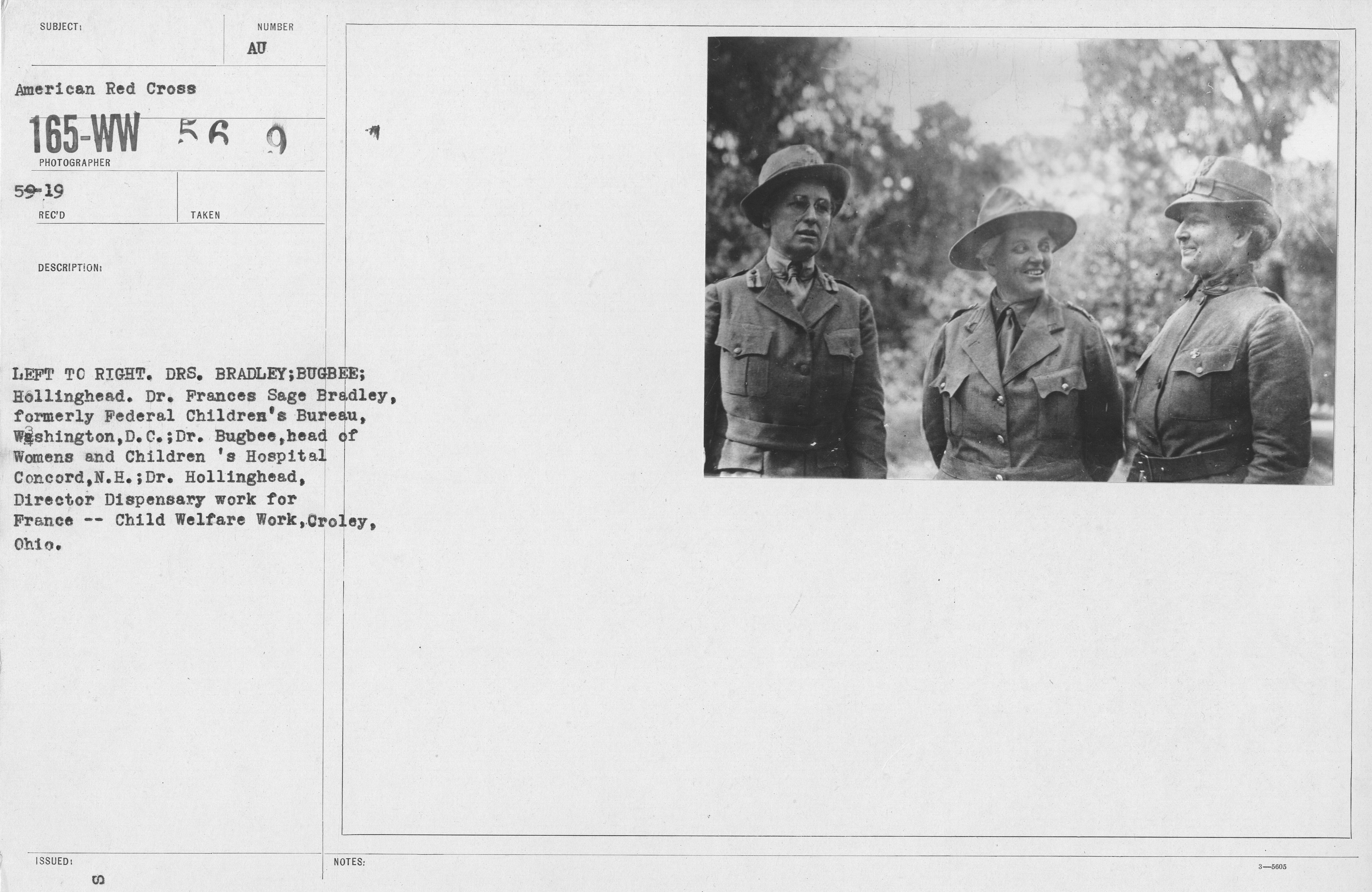
American Red Cross medical personnel in France during World War I, including (left to right) Frances Sage Bradley, Marion L. Bugbee, and Frances M. Hollingshead

Bradley practiced as a physician in Atlanta, Georgia from 1899 to 1914. She worked with the United States Children's Bureau, holding pediatric and maternal health clinics in remote Appalachian locations. She went to France with the American Red Cross during World War I.

Bradley was director of the Arkansas Bureau of Child Hygiene from 1922 to 1925, and director of the Montana Division of Child Welfare in 1926. In Arkansas, she was oversaw a county health survey in a rural community, which resulted in increased birth registrations, child nutrition goals, water quality, midwifery standards, and support for new public health nurse positions. "A simple study like this," she concluded, "made by the people most concerned, has a certain dramatic, impelling, practical value lacking in the more skilled survey of the experts, with all its scientific, polished remoteness."

Bradley was a member of the Daughters of the American Revolution, and a director of the Georgia Federation of Women's Clubs. She opposed "better baby" contests popular in some public health programs at the time. "The unsuccessful mother is not going to subject herself to the humiliation of a contest in which she is a foregone loser, yet she is agonized over her delicate baby and experiments often at the cost of its life," she said, adding that "ignorance, not indifference, is responsible for so many sick and dying babies."

== Publications ==
As part of her public health work, Bradley wrote reports and pamphlets for the United States Children's Bureau, the Russell Sage Foundation, and other agencies. She also wrote articles for professional journals including The Journal of Social Forces The Public Health Nurse, Child Health Magazine, and Hygeia, and for general interest magazines such as The Survey.

- The Care of the Baby (1913 pamphlet)
- "Suggestions for the Teaching of Child Hygiene" (1914)
- "How to conduct a children's health conference" (1917, with Florence Brown Sherbon)
- Infant Mortality: Results of a Field Study in Brockton, Mass: Based on Births in One Year. 1918-1919 (1918, with Dorothy Reed Mendenhall and Margaretta Williamson)
- Juvenile Delinquency in Certain Countries at War (1918, with Ernst Freund, Dorothy Reed Mendenhall, William Bacon Bailey, and Margaretta Williamson)
- The Child-Welfare Special: A Suggested Method of Reaching Rural Communities (1920)
- Report of the Committee on Treatment of Persons Awaiting Court Action and Misdemeanant Prisoners (1921, with C. Spencer Richardson, Hastings Hornell Hart, William Henry Slingerland, and others)
- "A Motorized Child Welfare Station" (1921)
- "A Survey of Conditions Affecting Children of Bradley County, Arkansas" (1922)
- "The Rural Mother and Child" (1922)
- "A County Looks at Itself" (1924)
- "Devious Devices of the Rural Worker" (1925)
- "Pennsylvania Protects Her Pre-School Children" (1927)
- "Redemption of Appalachia" (1931)

== Personal life ==
Sage married artist and editor Horace James Bradley in 1885. They had four children. Her husband died from tuberculosis in 1896, when all their children were still young. She retired from medicine in 1928, moved into her son's household, and died in Washington, D.C. in 1949, in her eighties. Emory University has a collection of Bradley's papers. In 2020, the University Press of Kentucky published a biography of Frances Sage Bradley, A Doctor for Rural America by Barbara Barksdale Clowse.
