= Kenneth Hollings =

Sir Alfred Kenneth Hollings, MC (12 June 1918 – 27 December 2008) was a British barrister and judge, who sat in the Probate, Divorce and Admiralty Division, then the Family Division of the High Court from 1971 to 1993.

== Biography ==
Born in Southport, Lancashire, Hollings was educated at The Leys School and Clare College, Cambridge, where he read law. During the Second World War, he served in the Royal Artillery with the Shropshire Yeomanry. He received a Military Cross in 1944 for destroying a German self-propelled gun and a tank under fire in Italy.

He was called to the bar by the Middle Temple and received a Harmsworth Scholarship. He joined chambers in Chapel Walks, Manchester. His pupil master was Joseph Cantley, later Mr Justice Cantley. At the bar, Hollings developed a large civil practice. He became a QC in 1966, Recorder of Bolton in 1968, and served as a County Court judge from 1968 until 1971.

Hollings was appointed to the High Court in 1971, assigned to the Probate, Divorce and Admiralty Division (shortly to become the Family Division), and received the customary knighthood.

He was elected a bencher of the Middle Temple in 1971 and was Lent Reader in 1979.
