= Vanessa Hollingshead =

American actress and stand-up comedian

- Born: New York City
- Spouse: Lucien Hold (died 2004)

Comedy career
- Years active: 1996–present
- Medium: Stand-up, television

Vanessa Hollingshead is an American actress and stand-up comedian who has performed on many comedy programs including Comedy Central Presents, Live At Jongleurs, Just For Laughs, The Jim Breuer Show, and Funny Women of a Certain Age. She has also acted in a number of films, including a small role in the 1999 film, Ghost Dog: The Way of the Samurai.

== Early life ==
Hollingshead was born in New York City. Her father was Michael Hollingshead, a British-born researcher who performed some of the first experiments with psychedelic drugs and hallucinogens, and who introduced Timothy Leary and Paul McCartney to LSD.

== Career ==
After years working as an office temp, in 1994 Hollingshead performed in an open mic night at the end of a four-hour-long night, claiming at the time "Even Richard Pryor wouldn't be funny at this point". Nine months later Hollingshead performed a twelve-minute slot at The Comic Strip Live on Second Avenue, New York City. As a result of this performance she was offered a number of development deals and an offer to appear on The Drew Carey Show, which she turned down. In 1996 she appeared on the Tompkins Square show hosted by Jeffrey Ross in her first television appearance. Further television appearances followed in 1997 and 1998, on Live At Jongleurs and The Jim Breuer Show. Whilst continuing with both live stand-up and television appearances (most notably when writing and appearing in Comedy Central Presents in 2004), Hollingshead also appeared in several films. As well as appearing in Ghost Dog: The Way of the Samurai, she appeared with ventriloquist act Otto & George and Jim Breuer again in the 2002 film American Dummy, and opposite Greg Fitzsimmons and Pete Correale in the 2003 film The Gynecologists. Hollingshead also runs comedy workshops for aspiring comedians.

== Personal life ==
Hollingshead was married to Lucien Hold, the founder and manager of The Comic Strip Live in New York, whom she had first met when she appeared there in 1995. Hold died in 2004 from complications arising from scleroderma. This led to Hollingshead becoming an active member of The Scleroderma Foundation, an organization which campaigns for support for patients and caretakers, education about scleroderma, and research to find a cure.
