= Frances M. Hollingshead =

American public health physician

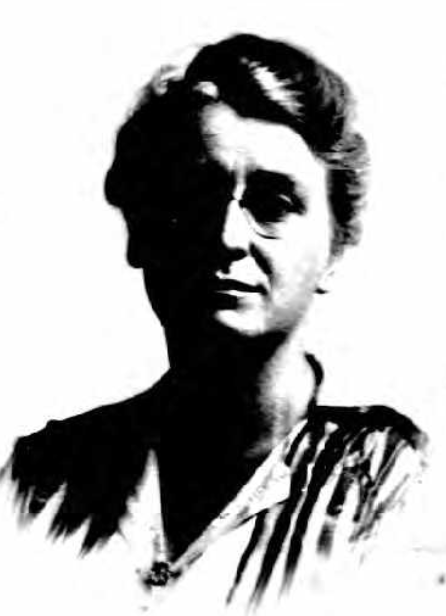
- Frances M. Hollingshead, from her 1918 passport application
- Born: June 30, 1876; Cincinnati, Ohio, U.S.
- Died: February 28, 1963 (aged 86); Loveland, Ohio, U.S.
- Occupations: Physician, public health official
- Relatives: James Edward Murdoch (grandfather)

Frances Murdoch Hollingshead (June 30, 1876 – February 28, 1963) was an American physician and public health official. She was director of the Buffalo Foundation. She went to France with the American Red Cross during World War I.

== Early life and education ==
Hollingshead was born in Cincinnati, the daughter of Marcus (Mark) Hollingshead and Rosalie Gilbert Murdoch Hollingshead. Her grandfather was actor James Edward Murdoch. She earned a medical degree from Miami Medical School in Ohio in 1904, and was the first woman to serve an internship at Christ Hospital in Cincinnati.

Her sister Lily Hollingshead James was an elocutionist.

== Career ==
Hollingshead was trained as an anesthetist. She was a public health physician, and director of the Division of Child Hygiene in the Ohio State Department of Health. "She is considered the chief promoter of Baby Week in Ohio," noted an Ohio newspaper in 1916. She served on the Board of Directors of the American Child Hygiene Association. During World War I she went to France to do child welfare work for the American Red Cross.

In 1920, Hollingshead was appointed the first executive director of the Buffalo Foundation, a community trust organization now known as the Community Foundation for Greater Buffalo. Under her leadership, the Foundation funded the construction of Kleinhans Music Hall, established a child guidance clinic, improved pre-natal programs, and published a directory of social services. She resigned from the Foundation in 1932. In her later career she helped to establish the Visiting Nurses program and the Babies' Milk Fund in Cincinnati.

Hollingshead was a member of the Zonta Club. She often spoke on child development and other subjects to women's clubs and other community organizations. "Nagging, untruthfulness and threats or the buying of obedience usually fail and we must impress on the young mind the fact that we are rational and truthful guardians," she said in one such lecture in 1929. "A mother solicitous of the welfare of her child never will allow emotion to reign."

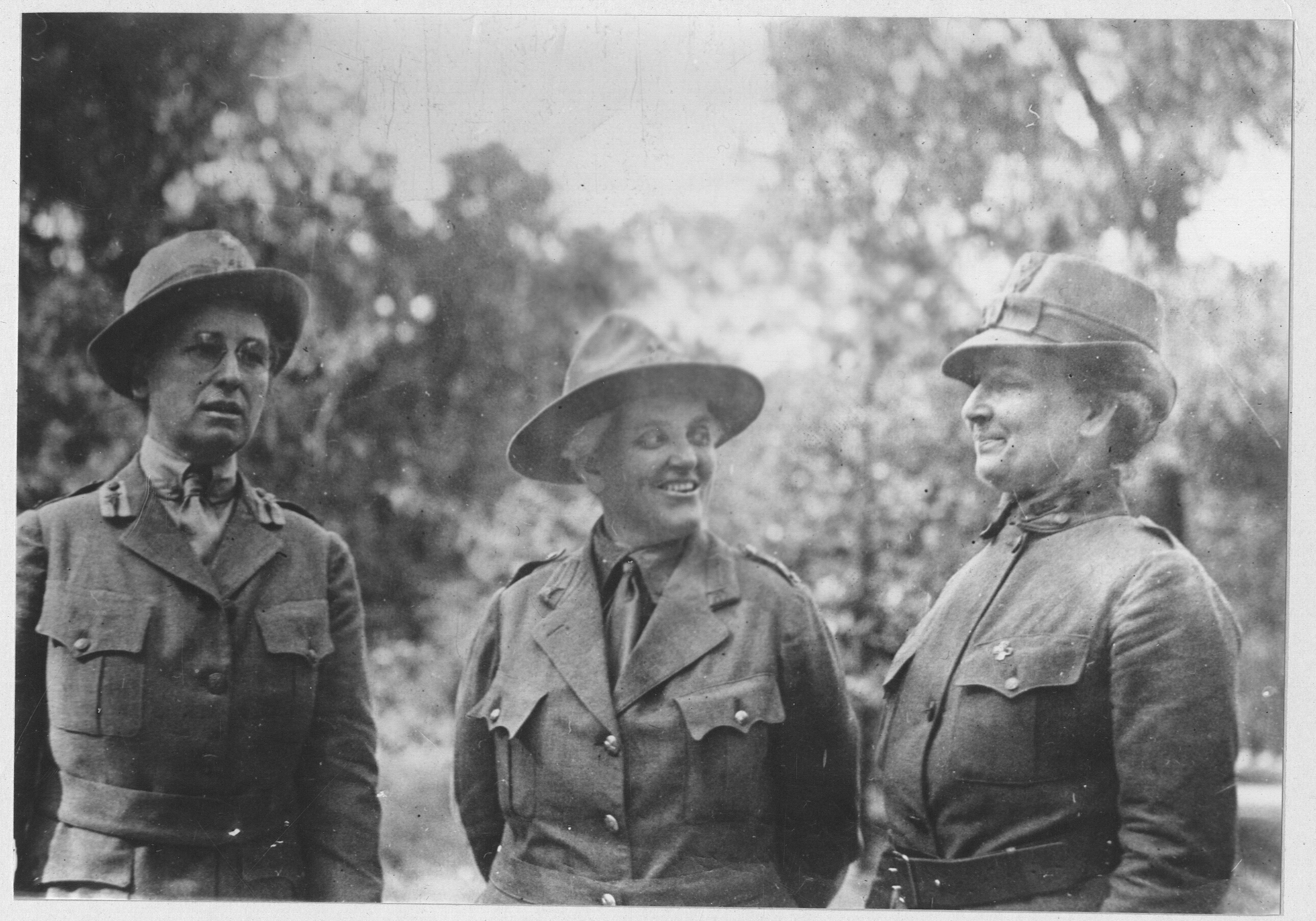
American Red Cross medical personnel in France during World War I, including (left to right) Frances Sage Bradley, Marion L. Bugbee, and Frances M. Hollingshead

== Publications ==
- "Personal Hygiene for Office Workers" (1913)
- "The Connection Between Tuberculosis and Women Office-Workers" (1913)
- "The Ohio School Child in 1917" (1917)
- "Junior Health Leagues" (1917)
- "Ohio's New Registration Bureau for Mothers" (1917)
- "Physical Education in Ohio Schools" (1918)
- "Proposed Children's Welfare Program" (1918)
- "Maternity Hospitals as a Rural Need" (1918)
- "To Buffalo Again" (1926)
- "The Present Status of Preschool Hygiene in the United States" (1927)

== Personal life ==
Hollingshead died in 1963 in Loveland, Ohio, at the age of 86.
