= Bay County Library System =

Public library system in Michigan

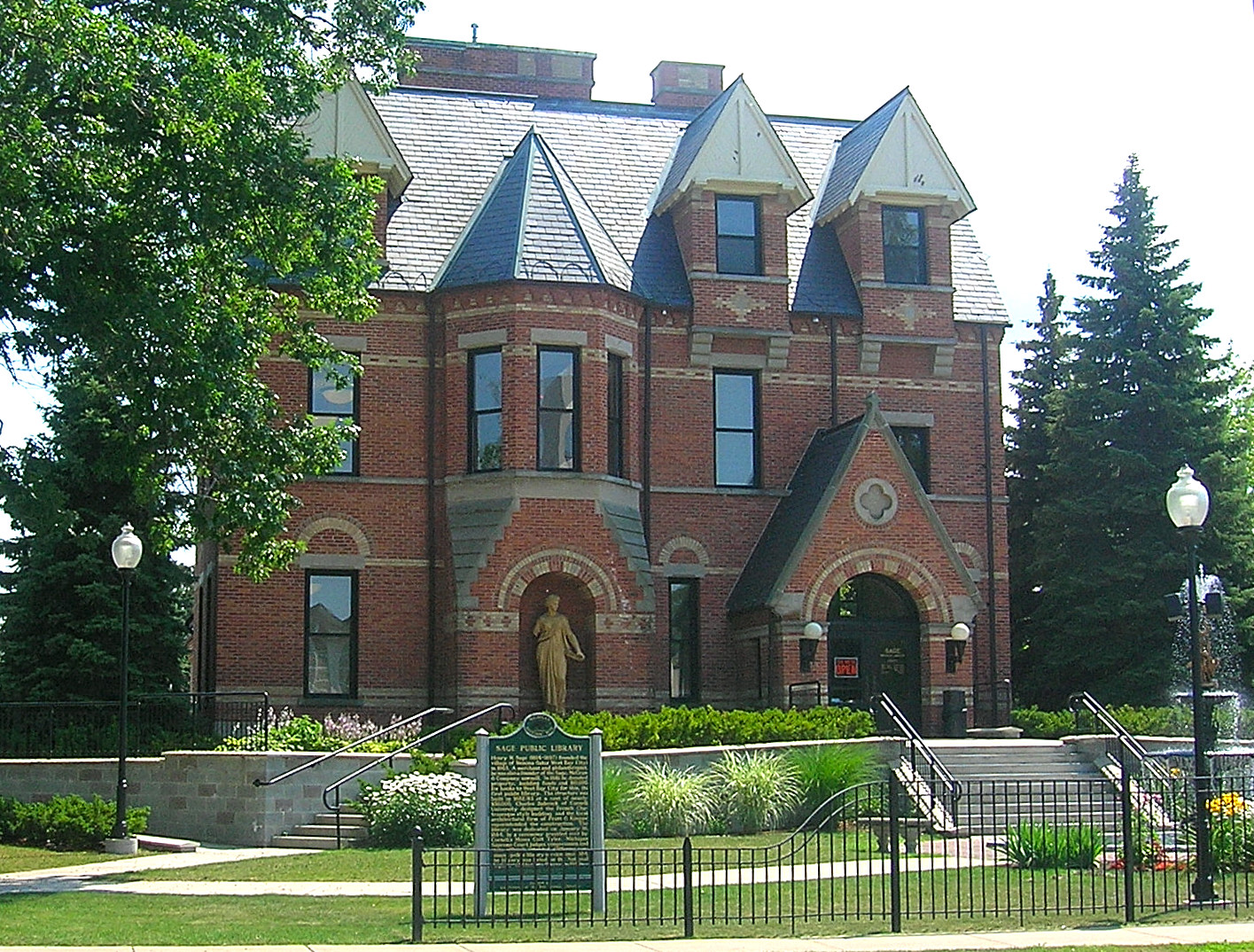
- The historic Sage Library
- 43.597215°N 83.885615°W
- Location: Bay County, Michigan
- Established: 1974
- Branches: 4

Access and use
- Circulation: 710,468 (2016)

Other information
- Budget: $4,943,021 (2016)
- Director: Trish Burns
- Website: www.baycountylibrary.org

The Bay County Library System (BCLS), is a public library system serving Bay County, Michigan. It contains four libraries and one bookmobile. The headquarters library, the Alice & Jack Wirt Public Library is located in Bay City, Michigan. The historic Sage Library is a part of this library system.

== History ==
The Bay County Library System was established on January 1, 1974 after the county electorate approved a $700,000 tax levy for five years. The Library System brought together three libraries, the Bay City Public Library and its Broadway Branch, The Sage Library, and The Pinconning Library) which previously were funded separately and independently by the cities of Bay City and Pinconning. These branches, together with the Auburn Area Branch Library, the South Side Branch Library, and the bookmobile would comprise the six "service outlets" of the Library System.

In 2000, Bay County voters approved a millage increase and bond issue to support capital improvements to the system, including new buildings for the Bay City and Pinconning branches and additions and renovations to the Auburn, Sage, and Southside branches Renovations to the Auburn and Sage branches were completed in the winter and spring of 2004, respectively. The new Pinconning Branch Library opened in October 2004. In December 2005 the Bay City Branch was replaced by the new Alice and Jack Wirt Public Library.

In 2006, voters twice failed to pass the operating millage required the provided 60 percent of the system's operating funds. As a result, the Bay County Library Board voted to close the South Side and Sage branch libraries, suspend Bookmobile service, and open the Auburn, Pinconning, and Wirt branches for restricted hours. Renovations to the South Side Branch are currently on hold pending resolution of the library's current operating funding situation.

In 2007, voters passed a reduced millage that allowed the Library System to once again open Sage and allow for more hours and services at all branches.
