= Edmund Hollings =

English physician

- Born: 1556? Yorkshire, England
- Died: 26 March 1612; Ingolstadt, Holy Roman Empire
- Occupation: Physician

Edmund Hollings (1556? – 26 March 1612) was an English physician.

== Biography ==
Hollings was born in Yorkshire in or about 1556, matriculated at Queen's College, Oxford, in 1573, when he was aged 17, and was admitted B.A. on 7 February 1574–5 (Oxf. Univ. Reg., Oxf. Hist. Soc., II. ii. 56, iii. 49). Renouncing Protestantism, he withdrew to France, and was, 14 May 1579, received into the English College of Douay, then temporarily removed to Rheims. On 21 August of the same year he left the college to proceed on foot to Rome, in company with five other students, who were admitted into the English College there in the following October. Hollings, however, does not appear to have become a member of the college, though he certainly resided there for several years, and became an intimate friend of John Pitts the biographer. An English spy, in his report to the government, stated that Hollings was one of the pope's scholars in the college in 1581 (Records of the English Catholics, i. 358). From Rome he proceeded to the University of Ingolstadt in Bavaria, when he was created M.D. and appointed professor of medicine. He was ‘highly venerated for his great knowledge, and the success he obtained in that faculty’ (Wood, Athenæ Oxon. ed. Bliss, ii. 114). He died at Ingolstadt on 26 March 1612.

His works, all of which were printed at Ingolstadt, are:

- De‘ Chylosi Disputatio,’ 1592, 8vo.
- ‘De Salubri Studiosorum Victu,’ 1602, 8vo.
- ‘Theses de Medicina.’
- ‘Poemata Varia,’ 8vo.
- ‘Orationes et Epistolæ,’ 8vo.
- ‘Medicamentorum Œconomia nova, seu Nova Medicamentorum in classes distribuendor. ratio,’ 1610 and 1615, 8vo.
- ‘Ad Epistolam quandam à Martino Rulando, Medico Cæsario, de Lapide Bezoar; et Fomite Luis Ungariæ,’ 1611, 8vo.
