= Cornell University Library =

Library system of Cornell University

Coordinates: 42°26′49″N 76°29′05″W

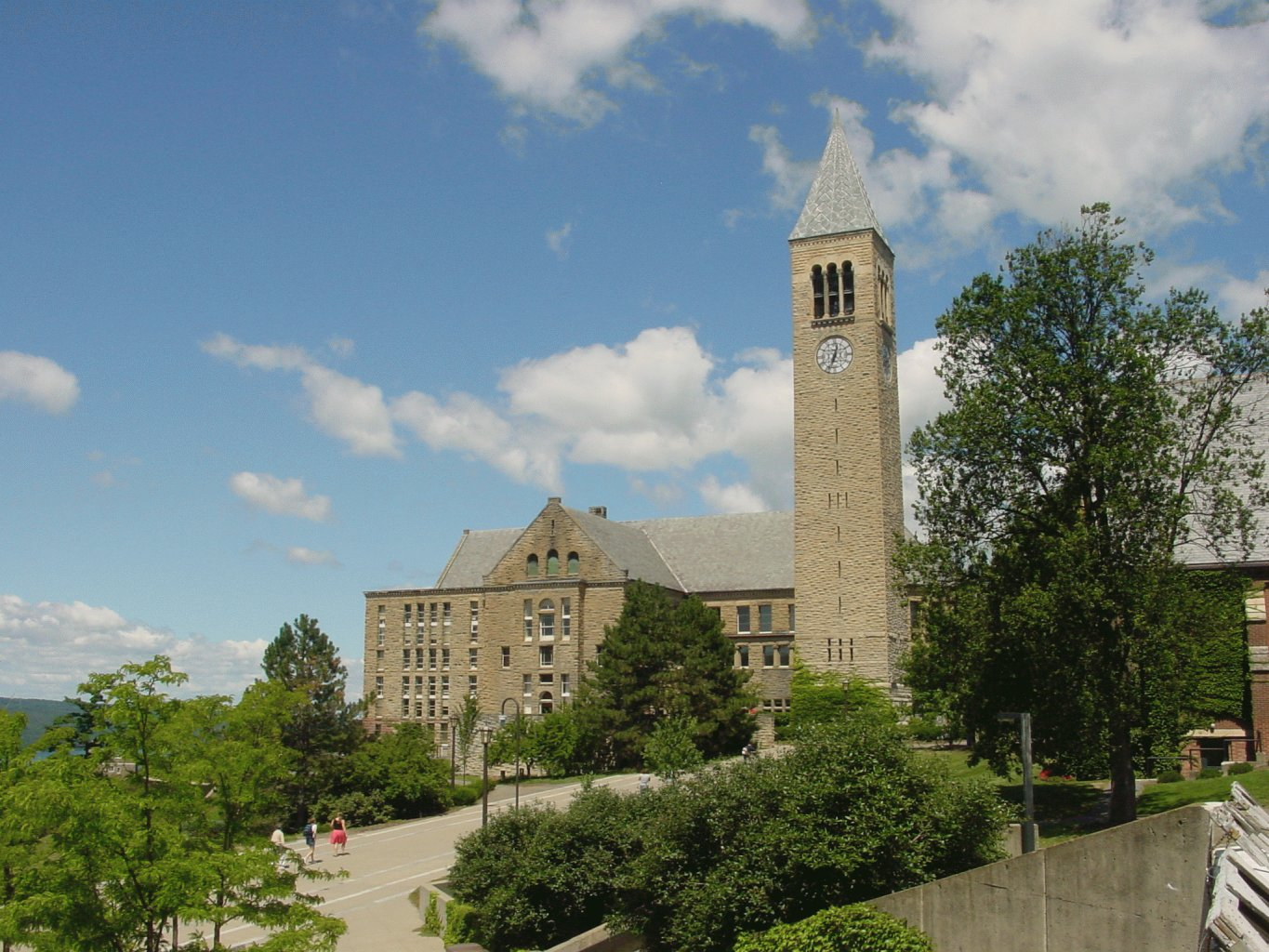
- Uris Library and McGraw Tower
- Location: Ithaca, New York, U.S.
- Type: Academic library system of Cornell University
- Established: 1866
- Branches: 16

Collection
- Items collected: more than 8 million printed volumes and over a million ebooks, 120,000 periodical titles, 8.5 million microfilms and microfiches, more than 71,000 cubic feet (2,000 m^{3}) of manuscripts, and close to 500,000 other materials, including motion pictures, DVDs, sound recordings, and computer files.
- Size: 8 million (2014)

Other information
- Budget: US$19 million (2023)
- Director: Elaine L. Westbrooks
- Employees: around 300 total (2020)
- Website: www.library.cornell.edu

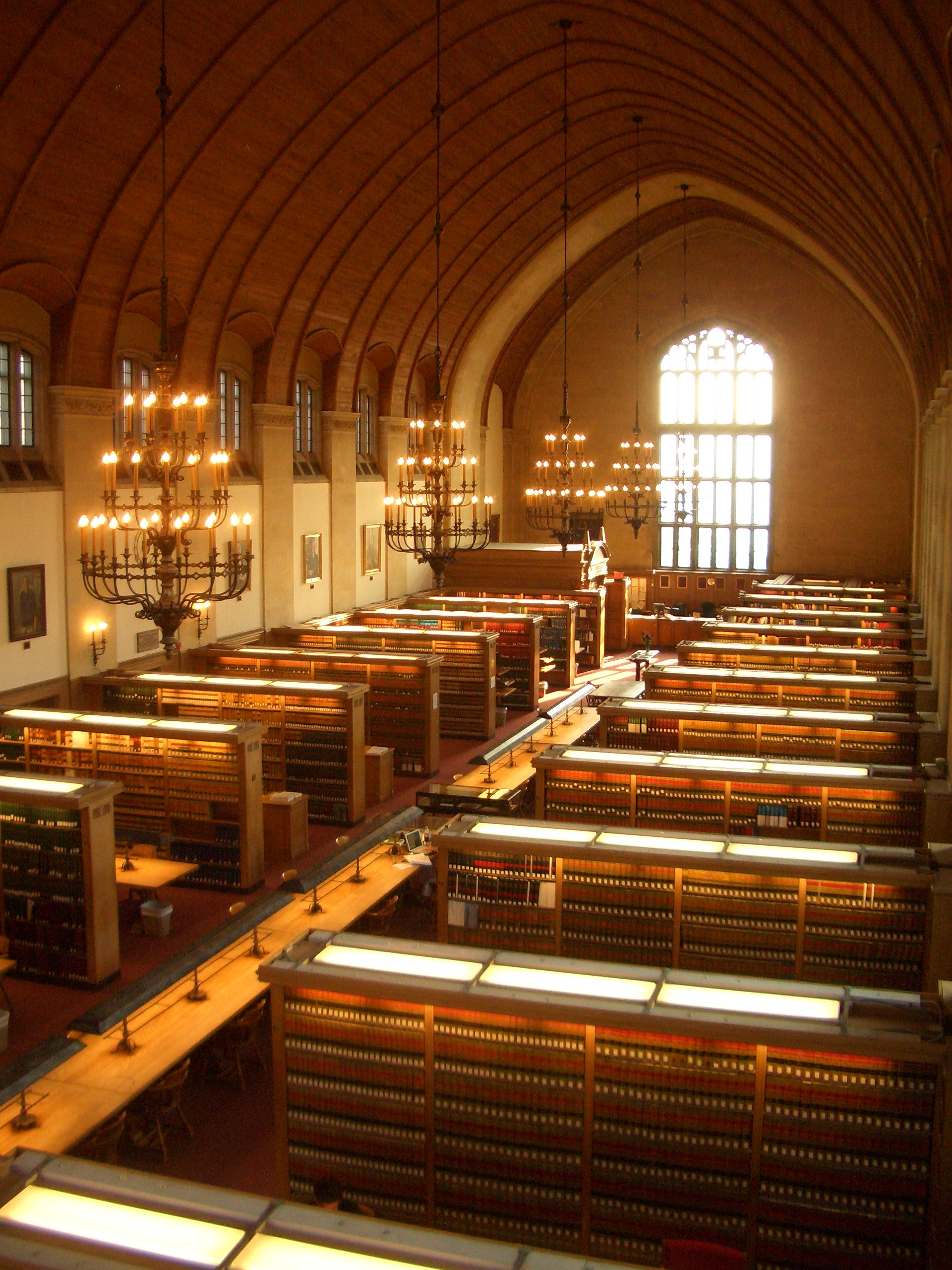
Cornell Law Library

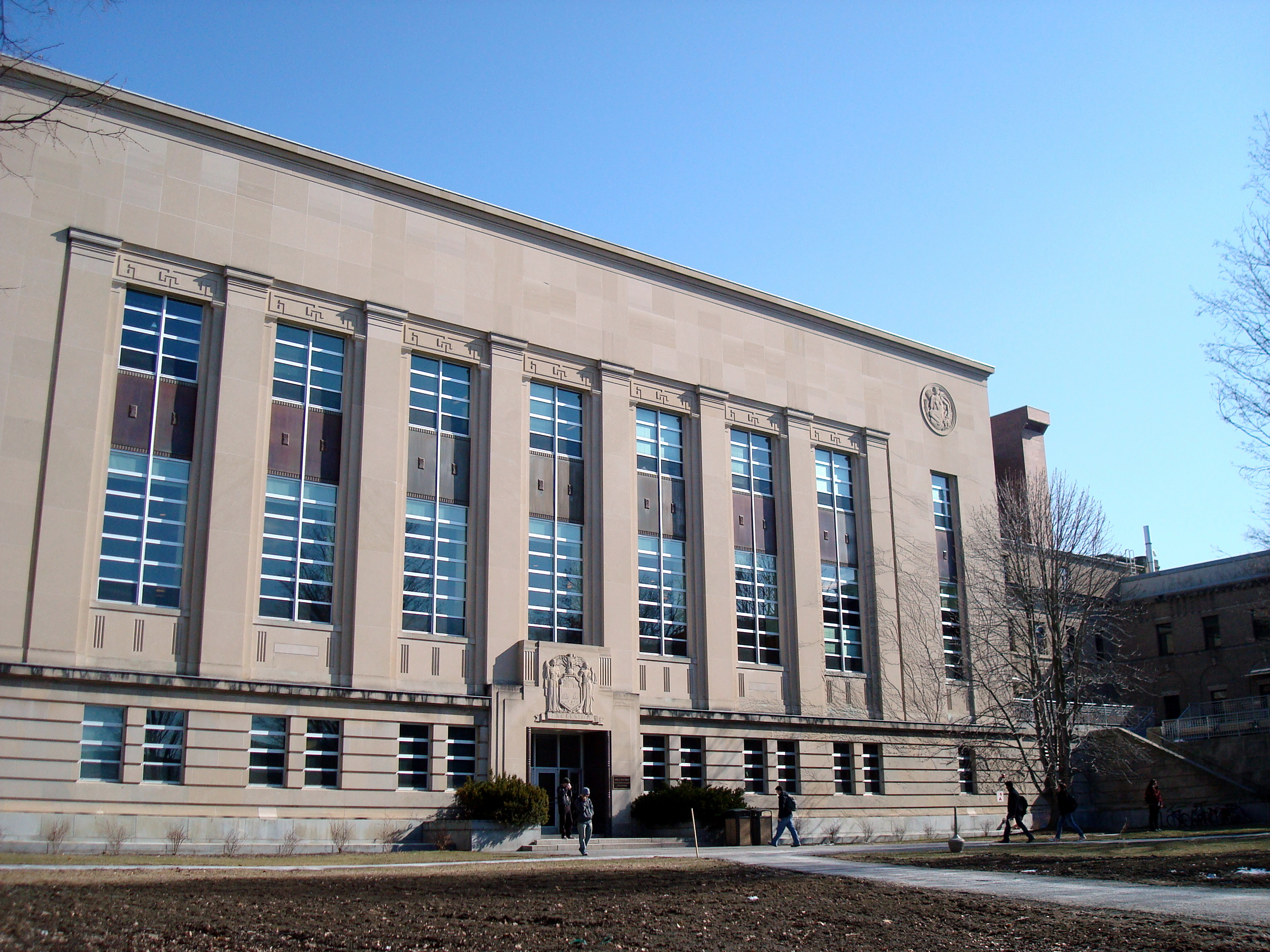
Mann Library

The Cornell University Library is the library system of Cornell University. As of 2014, it holds over eight million printed volumes and over a million ebooks. More than 90 percent of its current 120,000 periodical titles are available online. It has 8.5 million microfilms and microfiches, more than 71,000 cubic feet (2,000 m^{3}) of manuscripts, and close to 500,000 other materials, including motion pictures, DVDs, sound recordings, and computer files, extensive digital resources, and the University Archives. It is the 16th-largest library in North America, ranked by number of volumes held, and the 13th-largest research library in the U.S. by both titles and volumes held.

== Structure ==
The library is administered as an academic division; the University Librarian reports to the university provost. The holdings are managed by the Library's subdivisions, which include 16 physical and virtual libraries on the main campus in Ithaca, New York, a storage annex in Ithaca for overflow items, the library of Weill Cornell Medical College, and the archives of the medical college and of NewYork-Presbyterian Hospital in New York City, a branch of the medical library serving Weill Cornell in Qatar campus in Doha, and the library of the New York State Agricultural Experiment Station in Geneva, New York.

The John M. Olin Library is the primary research library for the social sciences and humanities, and the Harold D. Uris Library has extensive holdings in the humanities and social sciences. The Albert R. Mann Library specializes in agriculture, the life sciences, and human ecology. The Carl M. Kroch Library includes the university's Rare & Manuscript Collections and extensive Asia collections.

== History ==
The Cornell University Library system initially was a collection of 18,000 volumes stored in Morrill Hall. Daniel Willard Fiske, Cornell's first librarian, and Andrew Dickson White, Cornell University's first president, both willed their entire estates to Cornell University following their deaths. Under Fiske's direction, Cornell's library introduced a number of innovations, including allowing undergraduate students to browse through the books and check them out.

By 1885, the library had installed electric lights and stayed open 12 hours per day (instead of only a few hours per week—as most other libraries at American universities did at the time—just enough time for faculty to check out and return books), which allowed students to use it as a reference library.

== Initiatives ==
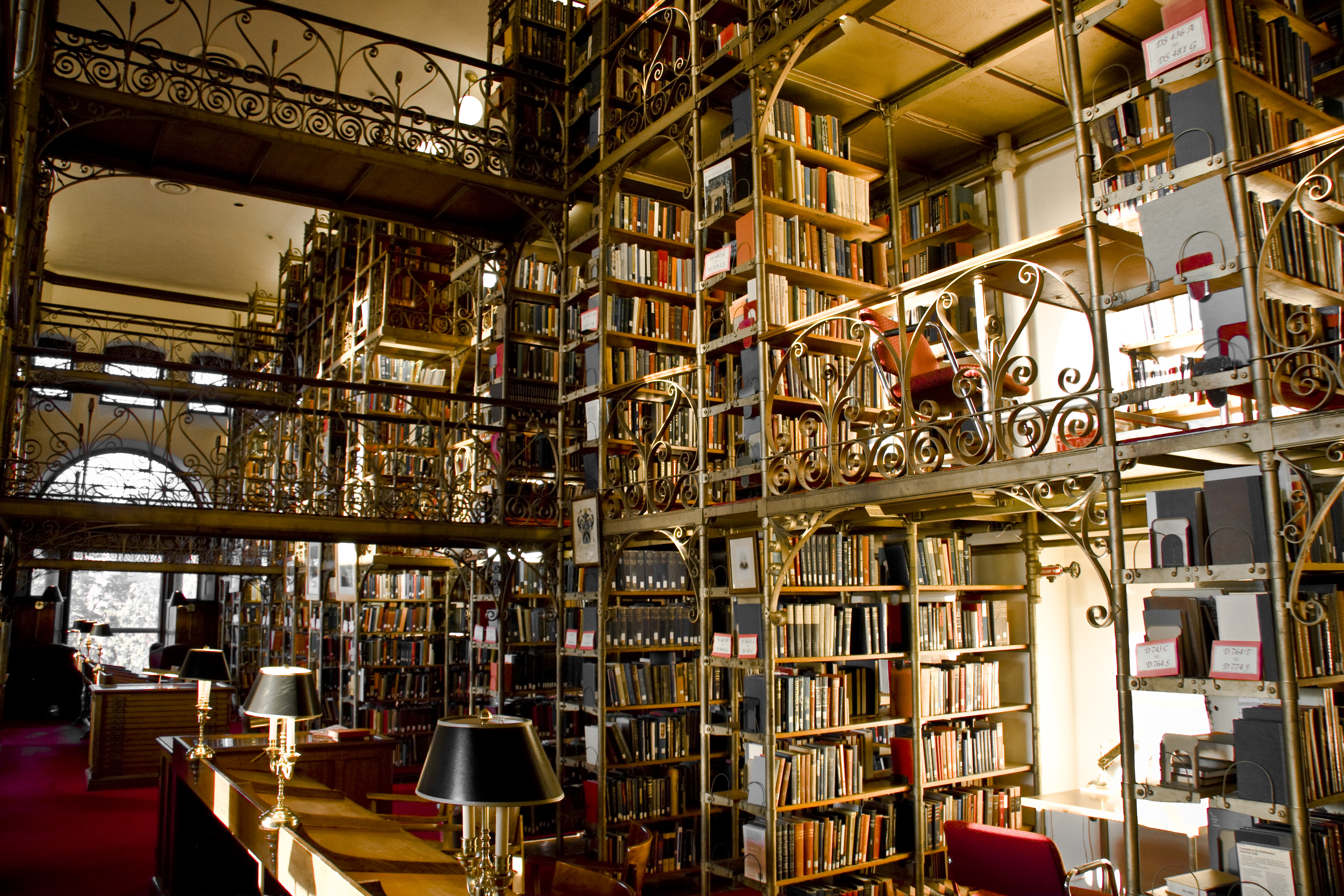
The A.D. White Reading Room at Uris Library

The library plays an active role in furthering online archiving of scientific and historical documents. It provides stewardship and partial funding for arXiv.org e-print archive, created at Los Alamos National Laboratory by Paul Ginsparg. arXiv has changed the way many physicists and mathematicians communicate, making the eprint a viable and popular form for announcing new research.

The Project Euclid initiative, named after Euclid of Alexandria, is a resource joining commercial journals with low-cost independent journals in mathematics and statistics. The project is aimed at enabling affordable scholarly communication through the Internet. Besides archival purposes, a primary goal of the project is to facilitate journal searches and interoperability between different publishers.

The Cornell Library Digital Collections are online collections of historical documents. Featured collections include the Database of African-American Poetry, the Historic Math Book Collection, the Samuel May Anti-Slavery Collection, the Witchcraft Collection, and the Donovan Nuremberg Trials Collection.

== Rare holdings ==
The library houses several rare manuscripts, including one of only five copies of Abraham Lincoln's Gettysburg Address (1863), the only copy that is privately owned and the only one accompanied both by a letter from Lincoln transmitting the manuscript and by the original envelope addressed and franked by Lincoln. The library houses cuneiform tablets; a major collection of medieval books and witchcraft trial records; thousands of pamphlets produced during the French Revolution; and the correspondence between Jefferson and Lafayette.

It also holds a copy of The Birds of America, of which only 120 complete sets are known to exist. The library also has first editions of Charles Darwin's Origin of Species (1859), the Book of Mormon (1830), and of Jane Austen's Pride and Prejudice (1813). The rare manuscript collection also includes a 1st edition copy of Thomas Hobbe's Leviathan from 1651.

The Rare and Manuscript Collection is housed in the Cornell Library System’s Carl A. Kroch Library. With more than 500,000 printed volumes and 20,000 cubic feet of manuscript materials, the collection is vast and useful to the faculty and staff of Cornell University, as well as the public who can access any of the collection that has been digitized. The collection dates back to the university’s founding in 1865, by the first president of the university Andrew Dickson White. In 1891, the collection received its founder’s 30,000-volume collection. Specifically, the Department of Rare Books was founded in 1951 and was absorbed into the Rare and Manuscript Collection in 1992, the year the current physical location opened its doors. The 14 main collections within the Rare and Manuscript Collection are the: American History & Culture, Architecture & City Planning, Asian History & Culture, Cornell University Archives, Digital Collections, European History & Culture, Food, Wine, and Culinary History, Icelandic History & Culture, Literature & Theater, Moving Images & Sound Recordings, Music, Photographs, Science & Technology, and Sexuality & Gender. The Rare and Manuscript collection houses the largest collection on the French Revolution outside of Paris, the largest collection in North America on European witchcraft, America’s founding collection on the abolitionist movement, and the second largest William Wordsworth Collection.

== Significant collections ==
=== Rose Goldsen Archive of New Media Art ===
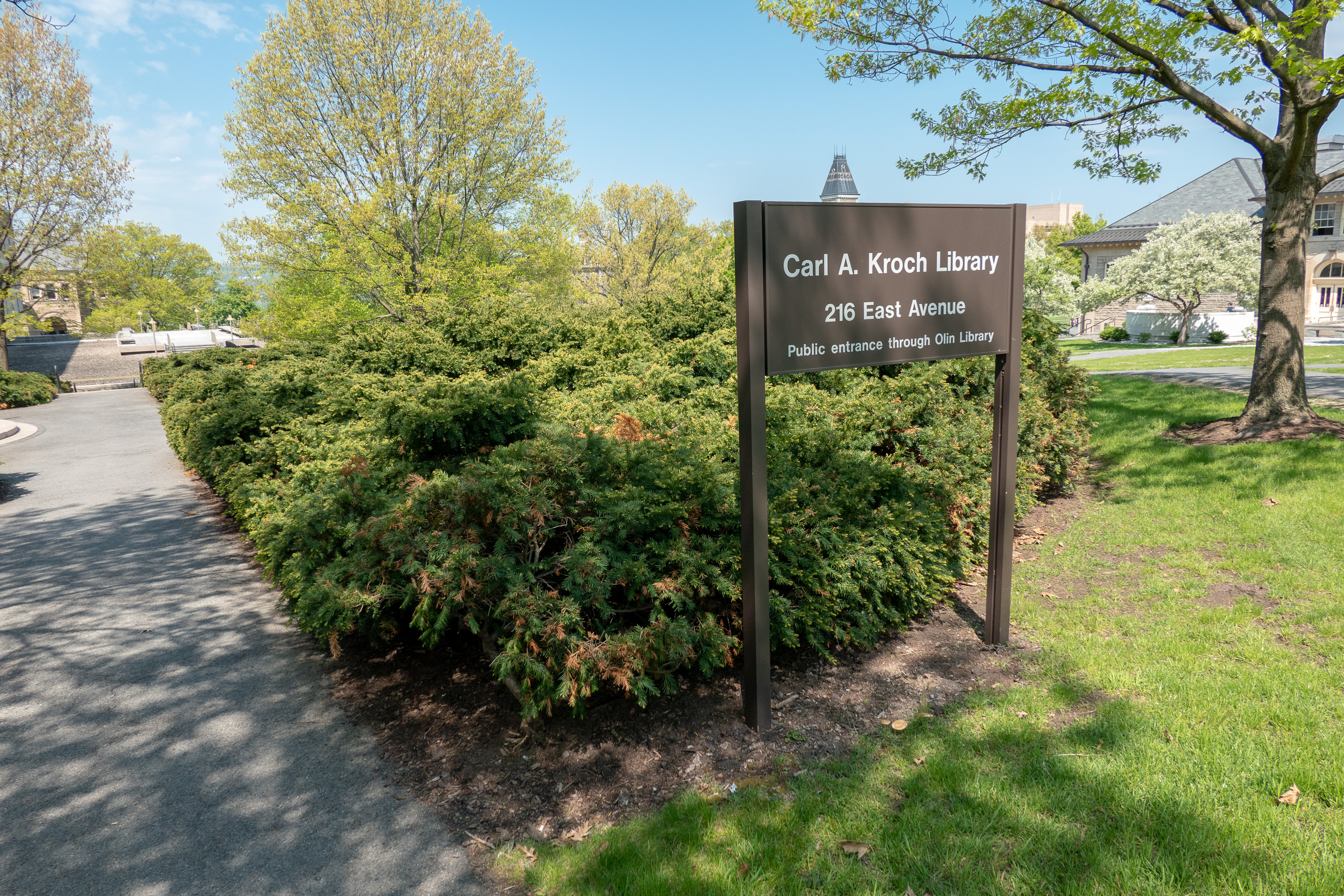
The Cornell University Library's Division of Rare and Manuscript Collections in Carl A. Kroch Library; access to it is through Olin Library.

Rose Goldsen Archive of New Media Art is a research repository for new media art. It was founded in 2002 by Timothy Murray, Professor of Comparative Literature and English and Director of the Society for the Humanities. It is located in the Division of Rare and Manuscript Collections at Cornell University Library and it is named in honor of the late Prof. Rose Goldsen, a Sociology Professor at Cornell University and an avant-garde critic of pop culture, mass media and communication. The Rose Goldsen Archive provides access to detailed archival material that mirrors the historical changes which have happened in new media art in terms of its technological development and experimentation, throughout the years.

==== General Collection ====
The archive's collections include multimedia artworks that reflect the transformation of new media art practices from analog to disc-based and from there to networked and web-based application during the past decades. The collections combine artworks produced on CD/ DVD-Rom, VHS/digital video and internet (online and offline holdings) as well as supporting materials, such as unpublished manuscripts and designs, digital and photographic documentation of installations and performances, digital ephemera, interviews, photographs, catalogs, monographs, and resource guides to new media art.

The general collection consists of various material about audio, sound art, eco and bio art, exhibitions, artist compilations, installations, interactive narrative, poetry, online listserv, internet art journals, performance, theory, video art, and cinema. Among the artists whose work can be found in the general collection are Gary Hill, Iimura Takahiko, Ardele Lister, Michael Snow, Janet Cardiff, Chantal Akerman, Jennifer and Kevin McCoy, Shu Lea Cheang, and others. The collection contains work ranging from the 1960s up to the present day.

==== Special Collections ====
Apart from the general collection, the Rose Goldsen Archive of New Media Art houses many special collections and fellowship competitions. Some of them are the following:
The Renew Media Fellowships in New Media, an annual competition for interactive dynamic media, was funded by the Rockefeller Foundation in New Media Art from 2002. The Goldsen Archive serves as the repository for the digitized copies of this competition material, such as the proposals, slides, artists' portfolios, other supportive material, etc. from 2003 to 2008.
The Wen Pulin Archive of Chinese Avant-Garde Art, a collaboration among the Goldsen Archive, the Charles W. Wason Collection on East Asia at Cornell University Library and the Dongtai Academy of Art in Beijing, China consists of 360 hours of videotape that documents Chinese contemporary art, installation, performance, video, and rock n' roll from 1985 to 2002. Some of the artists that are showcased in the collection are Cui Jian, Du Zhenjun, Feng Mengbo, Li Xianting, Lin Yilin, Lu Shengzhong, Mou Sen, Song Dong, Song Yongping, Xu Bing, Yu Xiaofu, Zhang Dali, Zhou Shaobo, Chen Lingyang.
The Yao Jui-Chung Archive of Contemporary Taiwanese Art contains the Taiwanese artist Yao Jui-Chung's portfolio, 8,000 images of Contemporary Art Exhibition Postcards and Taiwan performance art.
The "ETC: Experimental Television Center Archives" is a collection with more than 3,000 artistic video tapes and DVDs. It contains works by artists from both the contemporary and first generation of video art. The Rose Goldsen Archive of New Media Art has served as a repository for the Experimental Television Center's collection (1969-2011), since 2011. Some of the artists that are showcased in the collection are Barbara Hammer, Gary Hill, Jud Yalkut, Aldo Tambellini, Benton C Bainbridge, Irit Batsry, Alan Berliner, Kristin Lucas, Lynne Sachs, Michael Betancourt, Abigail Child, Laurence Gartel and Barbara Lattanzi, Emergency Broadcast Network, Nam June Paik, Kathy High, etc.
Net Art: The Goldsen Archive provides access to a number of internet art collections. It is the off-line repository for the Turbulence.org archive, a project of New Radio and Performing Arts, Inc. (NRPA), the Computerfinearts.com and the Infos 2000. In addition, the Archive serves as an on-line repository for the online journal of net.art, CTHEORY Multimedia and the Ecopoetics online exhibition.

==== Preservation ====
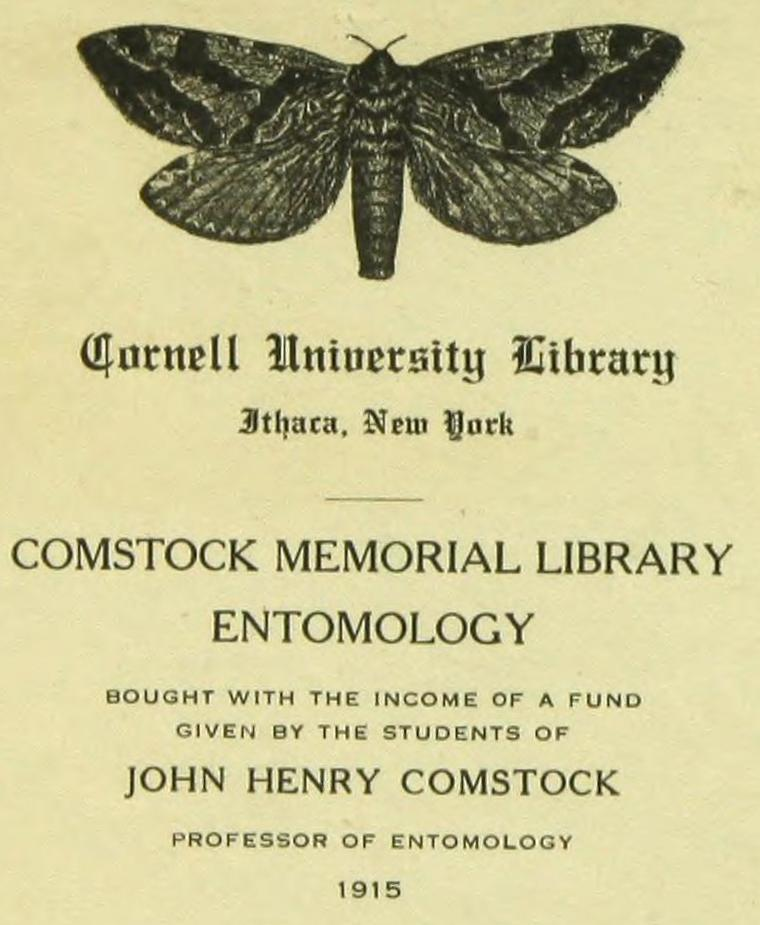
Book plate, Comstock Memorial Library, 1915

Because of the fragility and the complexity of the artworks, most of which are born-digital and many of which are interactive, the Archive focuses on building archival strategies that endure the continuous access to all this fragile material. The Goldsen Archive is one of the six international digital art archives dedicated to Preservation and Documentation Strategies; other similar archives are Ars Electronica, Tate Intermedia, FACT, computerfinearts.com (which has its repository in Goldsen Archive) and Rhizome Artbase. In addition, the Archive has signed the International Declaration "Media Art Needs Global Networked Organization and Support", sponsored by Media Art History. Org. The Goldsen Archive has completed a National Endowment for the Humanities- funded preservation initiative that aims to make access to complex interactive and digital-born media artworks simple and more reliable, which will allow these artworks to be used and viewed on modern computers.

== Other collections ==
- Agriculture collections
  - The Core Historical Literature of Agriculture
- Asia collections
  - Echols Collection on Southeast Asia
  - Wason Collection on East-Asia
  - South Asia Collection
- Cornell Hip Hop Collection
- Fiske Icelandic Collection
- Home Economics Archive: Research, Tradition and History (HEARTH)
- Human Sexuality Collection
- Kinematic Models for Design Digital Library (KMODDL)
  Movies and photos of hundreds of working mechanical-systems models at Cornell University. Also includes an e-book library of classic texts on mechanical design and engineering.
- Making of America Collection
- Ornithology collection
- Race and Religion Collection
- The Rose Goldsen Archive of New media Art serves as a repository for many special collections and fellowship competitions, such as:
  - The Repository of the Experimental Television Center
  - Foundation Fellowships in New Media Art
  - The Wen Pulin Archive of Chinese Avant-Garde Art
  - The Lynn Hershman Leeson archive
- Samuel May Anti-Slavery Collection
- Witchcraft Collection
- Other digital collections

== Units ==
- Adelson Library (Cornell Lab of Ornithology)
- Africana Library (Africana Studies and Research Center)
- Catherwood Library (Industrial and Labor Relations Library)
- Engineering Library (Carpenter Hall)
- Geneva Experiment Station Library
- Kroch Library: Asia Collections and Rare and Manuscript Collections
- Law Library
- Management Library (Samuel Curtis Johnson Graduate School of Management, Sage Hall)
- Mann Library
- Mathematics Library (Malott Hall)
- Medical Library (Weill Cornell Medical Library)
- Mui Ho Fine Arts Library (Rand Hall)
- Music Library (Lincoln Hall)
- Nestlé Library (School of Hotel Administration Library)
- Olin & Uris Libraries (Uris Library and Olin Library)
- Physical Sciences Library (virtual)
- Veterinary Library (Flower-Sprecher Veterinary Library)
