= Cornell University College of Arts and Sciences =

College

Coordinates: 42°26′57″N 76°29′1″W

College of Arts and Sciences
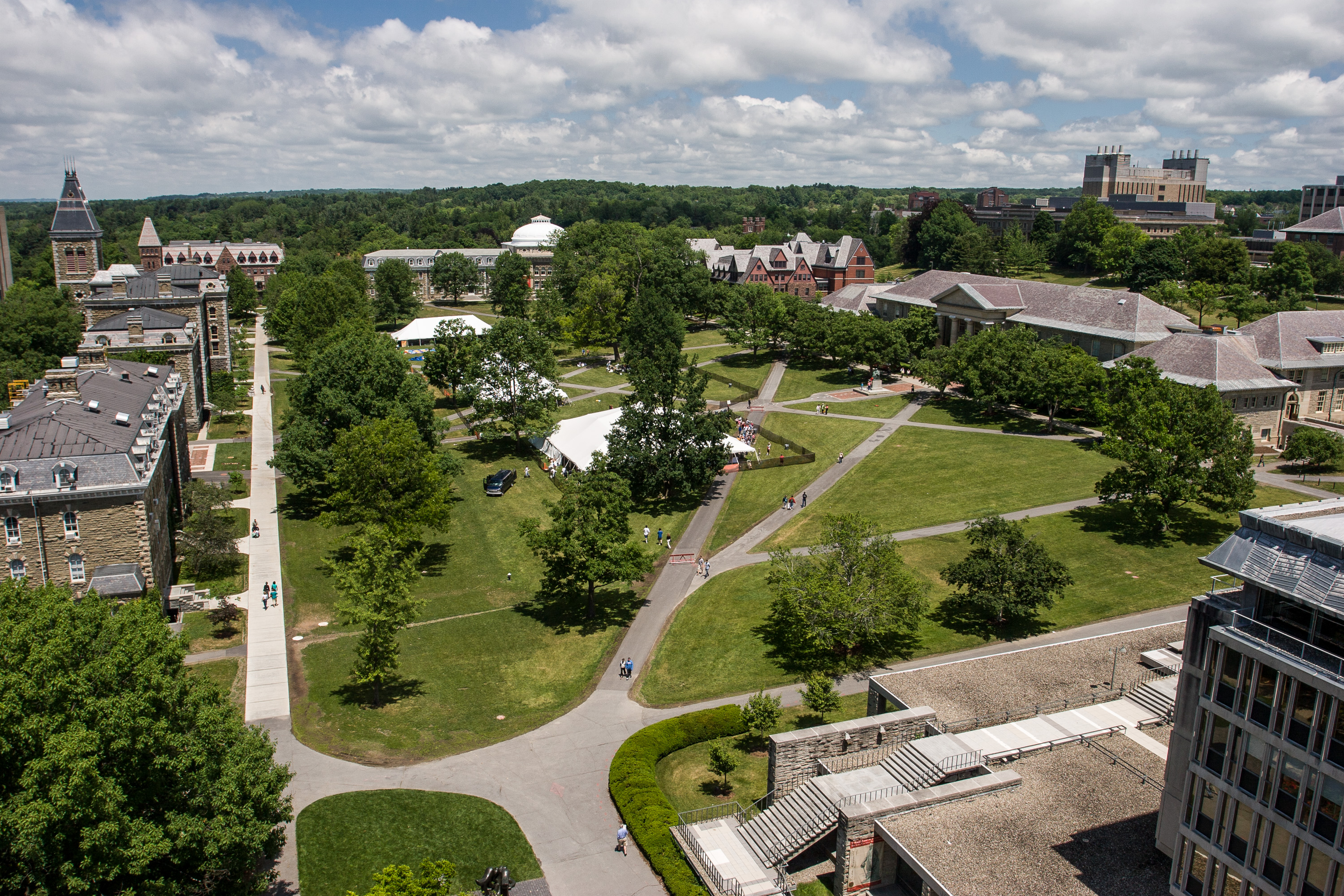
- An aerial view of the Arts Quad at Cornell University in June 2007
- Type: Private
- Established: 1865
- Dean: Peter Loewen
- Faculty: 526
- Undergraduates: 4,251
- Postgraduates: 1,301
- Location: Ithaca, New York, U.S.
- Website: as.cornell.edu

The Cornell University College of Arts and Sciences (CAS or A&S) is an academic college at Cornell University. It has been part of the university since its founding in 1865, although its name has changed over time. It is the largest of Cornell University's colleges and schools with 4,759 undergraduate students, 1,337 graduate students, and 515 full-time faculty plus many lecturers, and offers more than 2,000 courses.

The college grants bachelor's degrees, and masters and doctorates through affiliation with the Cornell University Graduate School. Its major academic buildings are located on the Arts Quad of Cornell University's main campus in Ithaca, New York, which includes some of the university's oldest and most historic buildings.

== History ==
=== 19th century ===
When it was founded in 1865, Cornell University's faculty was initially undifferentiated. With the founding of the Cornell Law School in 1886 and the concomitant self-segregation of the school's lawyers, however, departments and colleges began to be formed at the university.

=== 20th century ===
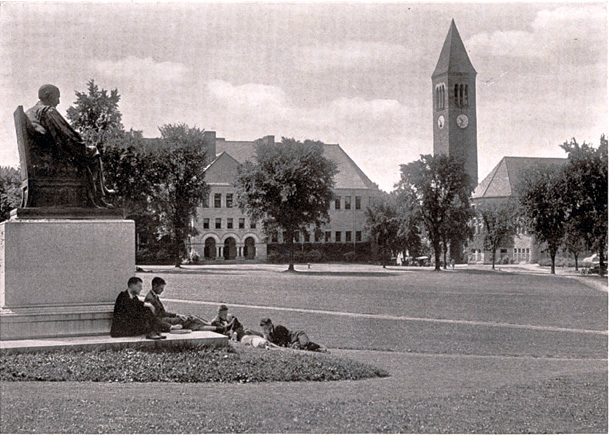
The Arts Quad in 1919

In 1903, the academic division that ultimately became the College of Arts and Sciences was renamed as the Academic Department. The College endowed the first professorships in American history, musicology, and American literature.

From 1923 to 1945, Cornell professor Robert Morris Ogden, a professor of psychology and expert on Gestalt psychology, served as the dean of the College of Arts and Sciences.

=== 21st century ===
In June 2018, Ray Jayawardhana was named the 22nd dean. On July 13, 2023, Rachel Bean succeeded Jayawardhana as interim dean. On August 1, 2024, Peter John Loewen became the 23rd dean.

== Arts Quadrangle ==
1. Sibley Hall; 2. Tjaden Hall; 3. White Hall; 4. McGraw Hall; 5. Morrill Hall; 6. Uris Library; 7. Olin Library; 8. Stimson Hall; 9. Goldwin Smith Hall; 10. Klarman Hall; 11. Lincoln Hall

The Arts Quad on the campus of Cornell University is the site of the university's original academic buildings, which are associated with most of the College of Arts and Sciences' classes and programs. On the western side of the quad, at the top of Libe Slope, are Morrill Hall (completed in 1866), McGraw Hall (1872) and White Hall (1868). All of these buildings are built with native Cayuga bluestone to reflect Ezra Cornell's utilitarianism and are known as Stone Row. The statue of Ezra Cornell, dating back to 1919, stands between Morrill and McGraw Halls. Across from this statue, in front of Goldwin Smith Hall, sits the statue of Andrew Dickson White, Cornell's other co-founder and its first president.

Lincoln Hall (1888) also stands on the eastern face of the quad next to Goldwin Smith Hall. On the northern face are the domed Sibley Hall and Tjaden Hall (1883). Just off of the quad on the Slope, next to Tjaden, stands the Herbert F. Johnson Museum of Art, designed by I. M. Pei (1973). Stimson Hall (1902), Olin Library (1959) and Uris Library (1892), with Cornell's landmark clocktower, McGraw Tower, stand on the southern end of the quad.

Olin Library replaced Boardman Hall (1892), the original location of the Cornell Law School. In 1992, an underground addition was made to the quad with Kroch Library, an extension of Olin Library that houses several special collections of the Cornell University Library, including the Division of Rare and Manuscript Collections. Klarman Hall, the first new humanities building at Cornell in over 100 years, opened in 2016. Klarman houses the offices of Comparative Literature and Romance Studies. The building is connected to, and surrounded on three sides by, Goldwin Smith Hall and fronts East Avenue.

Legends and lore about the Arts Quad and its statues can be found at Cornelliana.

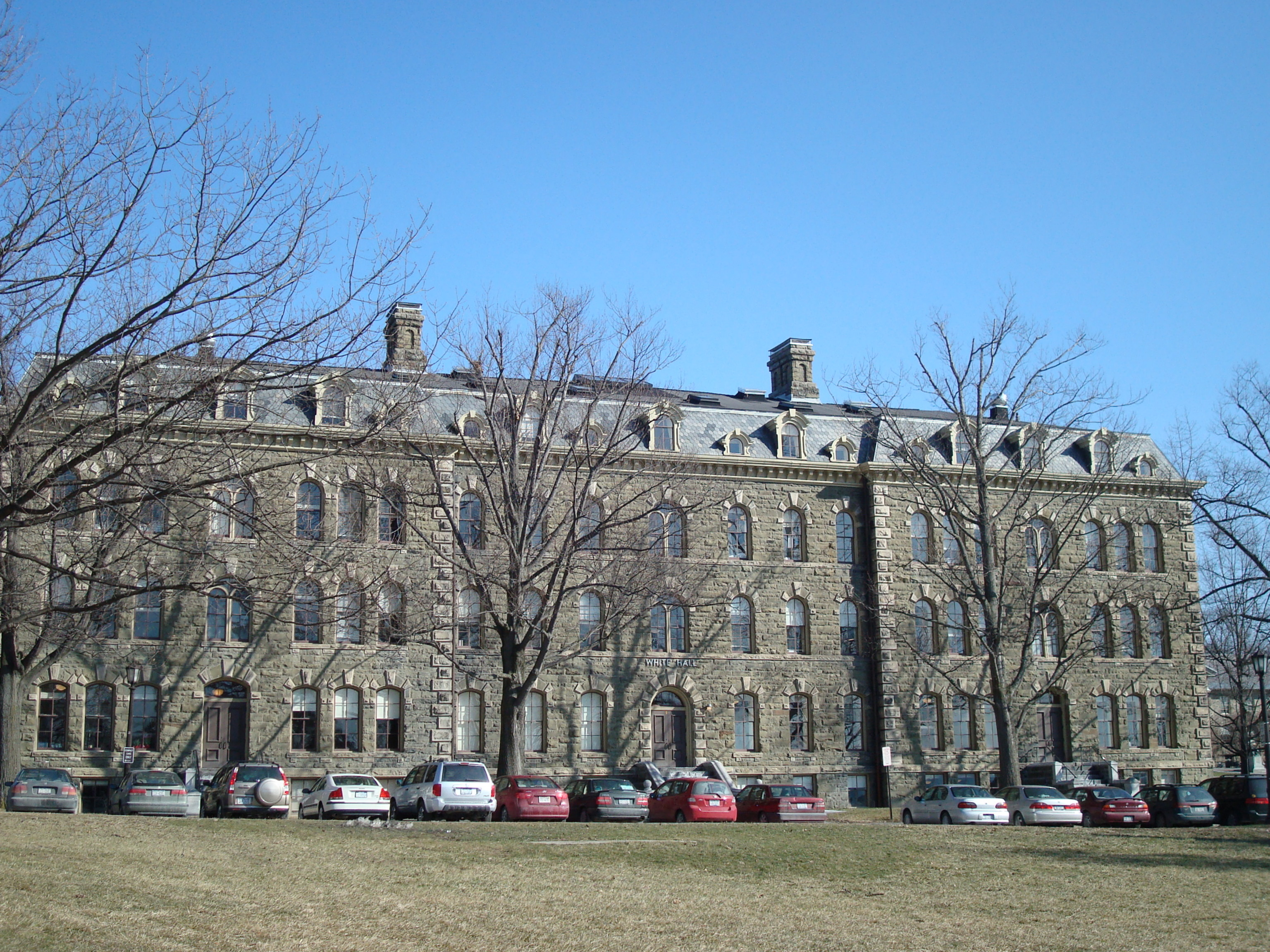
White Hall

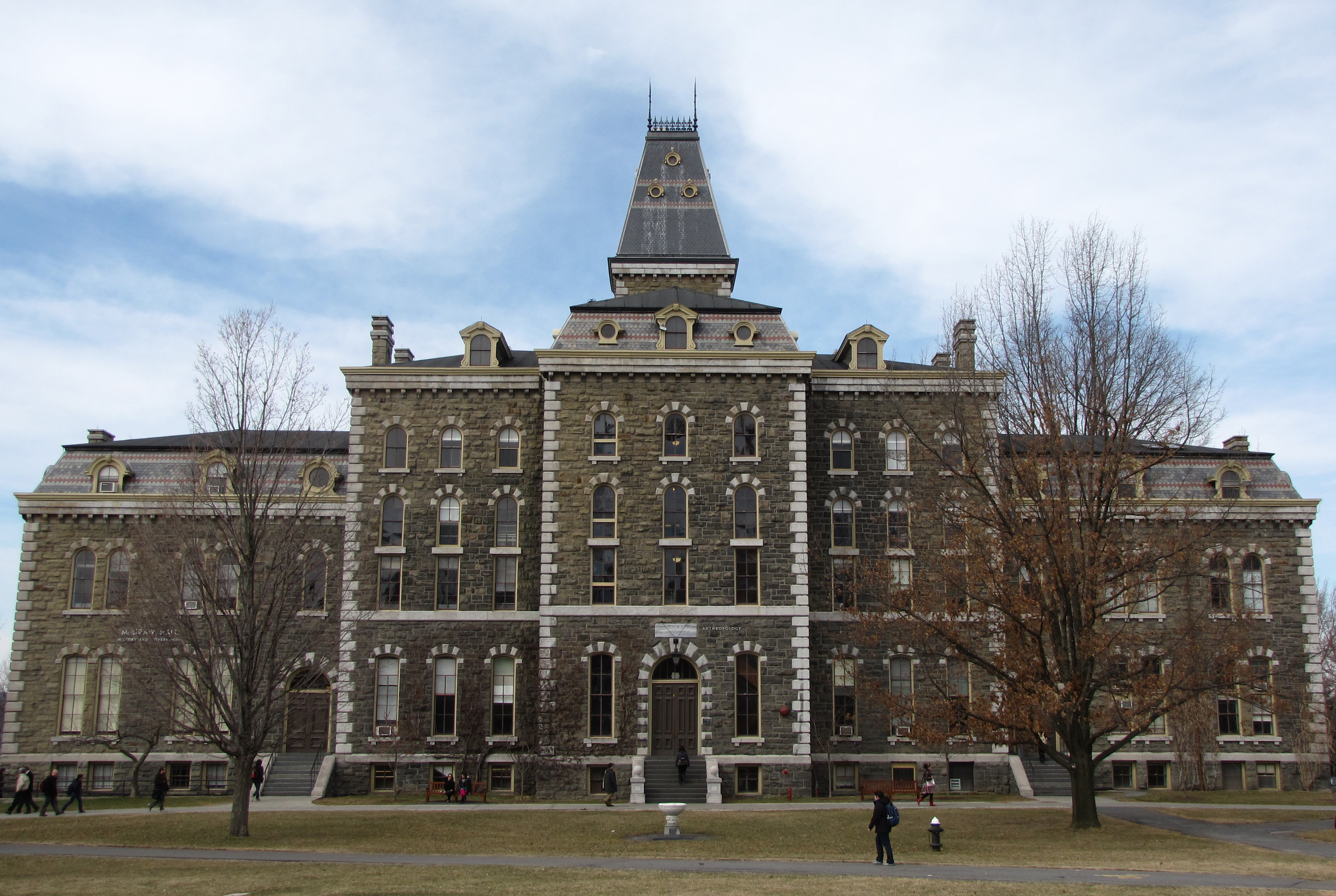
McGraw Hall

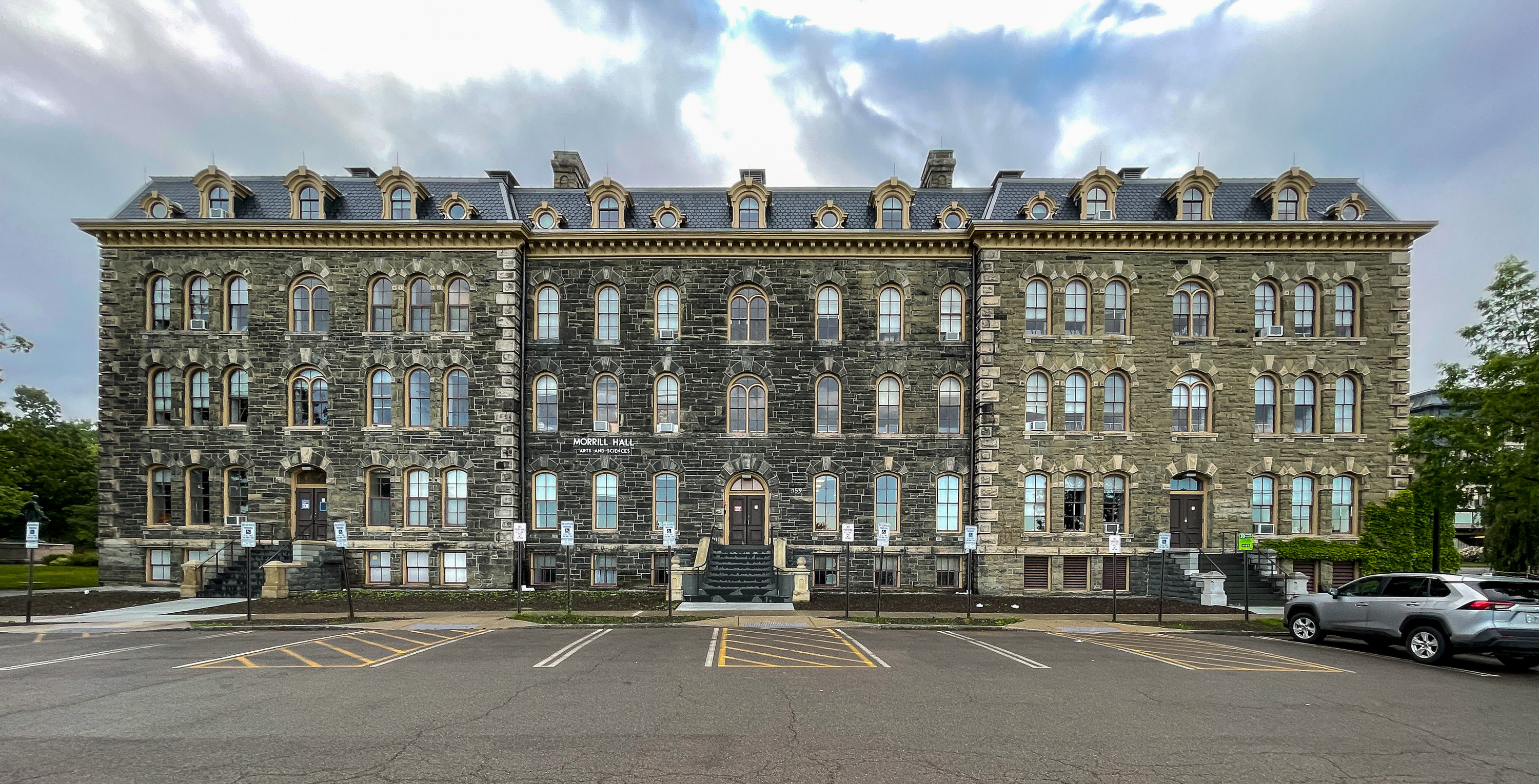
Morrill Hall

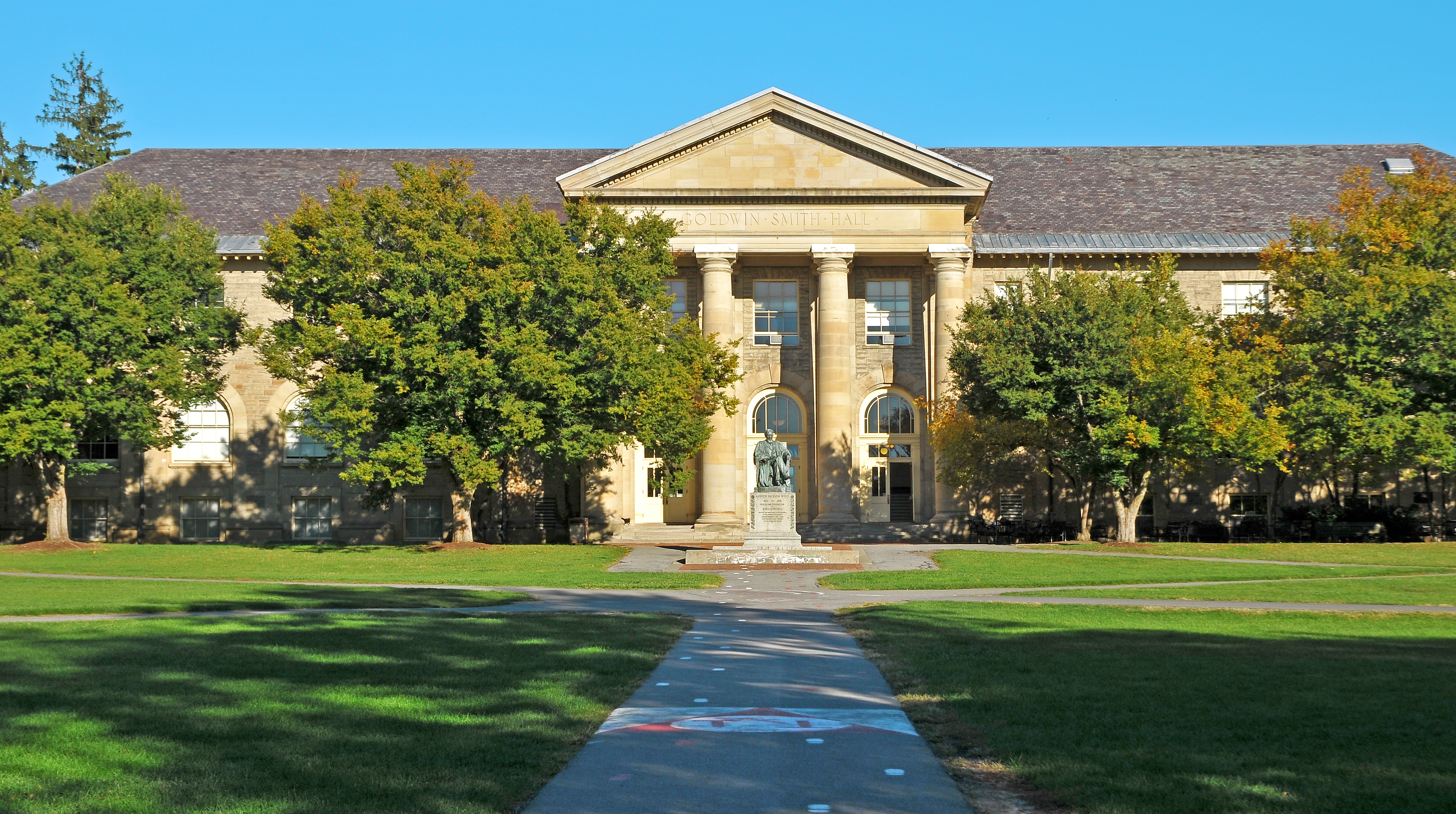
Goldwin Smith Hall

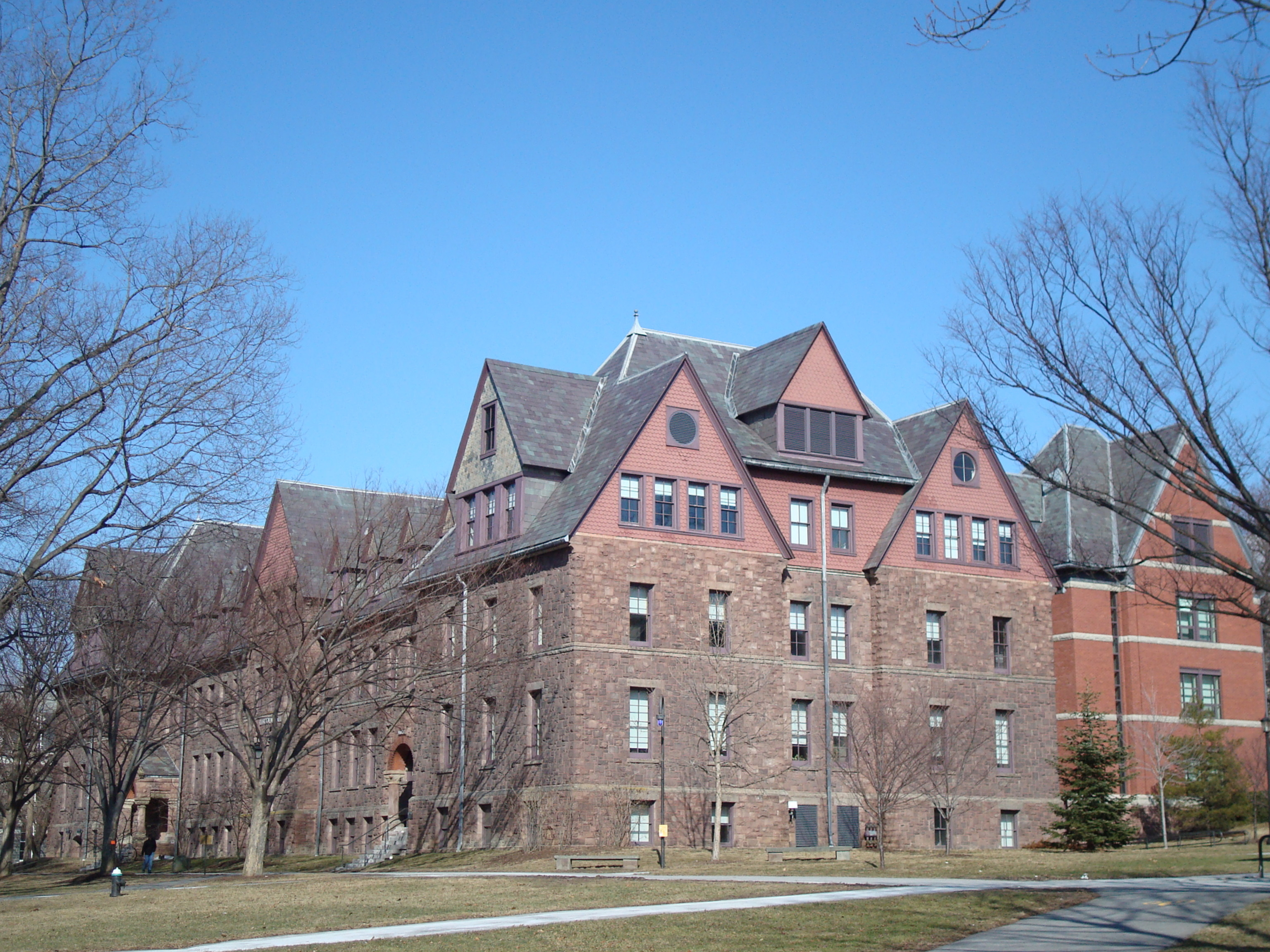
Lincoln Hall

== Academics ==
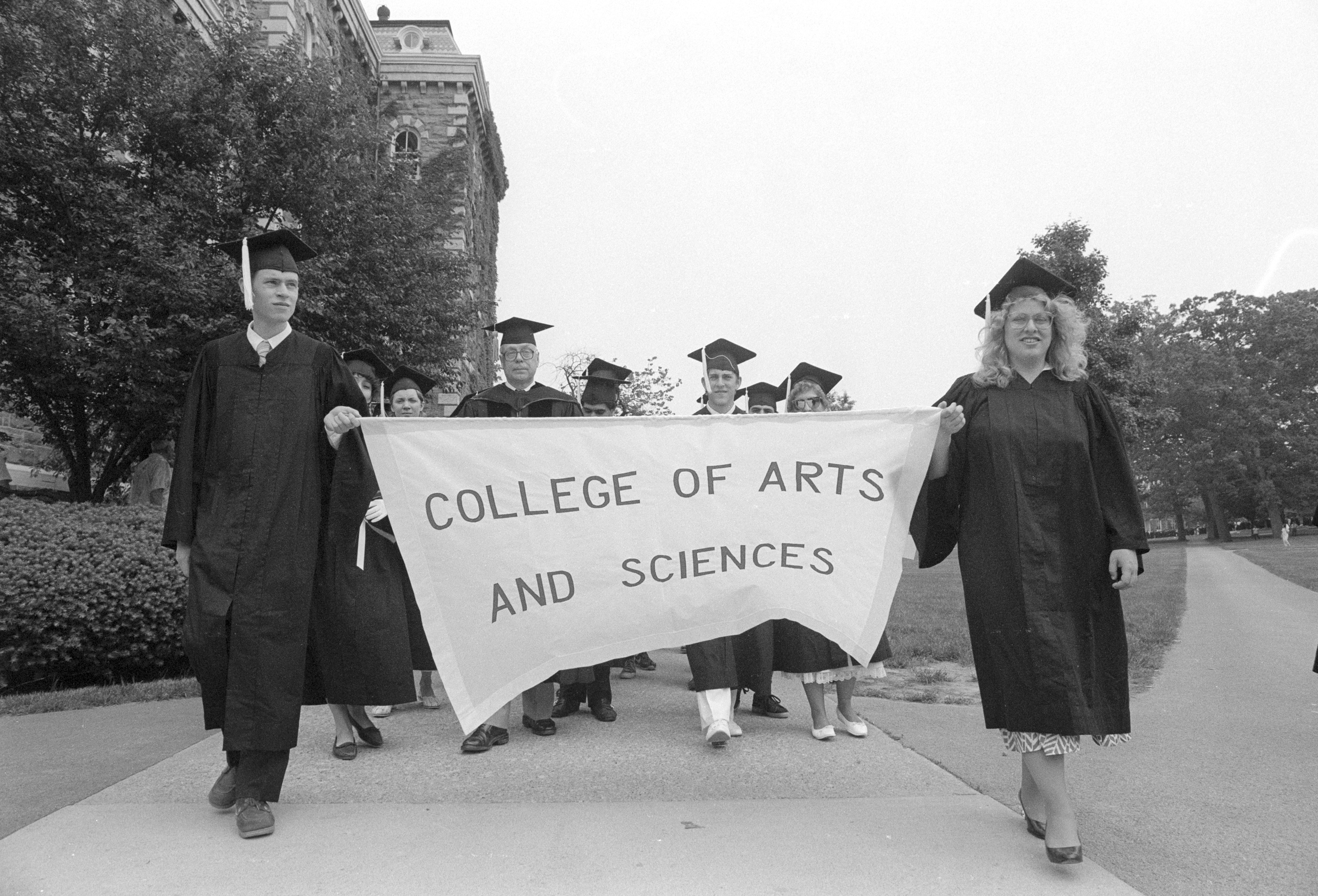
1987 Arts and Sciences commencement procession

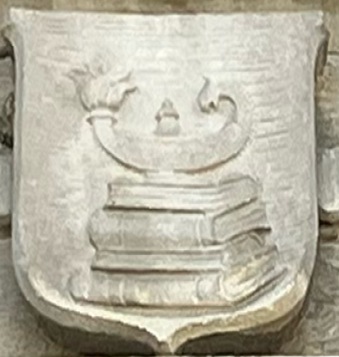
On the left, the shield of A&S as seen at the entrance of Willard Straight Hall. On the right, the banner of A&S used at commencement ceremonies.

=== Majors ===
Programs and courses announcement for 1972–73

The College of Arts and Sciences offers both undergraduate and graduate (through the Graduate School) degrees. The only undergraduate degree is the Bachelor of Arts. The majors within the college are:

- Africana Studies
- American Studies
- Anthropology
- Archaeology
- Asian Studies
- Astronomy
- Biological Sciences
- Biology & Society
- Chemistry
- China & Asia-Pacific Studies
- Classics
- Cognitive Science
- College Scholar (frees selected students in each class from all degree requirements and allows them to fashion a plan of study conducive to achieving their ultimate intellectual goals; a senior thesis is required)
- Comparative Literature
- Computer Science
- Earth and Atmospheric Sciences
- Economics
- English
- Environment and Sustainability
- Feminist, Gender, and Sexuality Studies
- French
- German Studies
- Government
- History
- History of Art
- Information Science
- Italian
- Jewish Studies
- Linguistics
- Mathematics
- Music
- Near Eastern Studies
- Performing & Media Arts
- Philosophy
- Physics
- Psychology
- Public Policy
- Religious Studies
- Science and Technology Studies
- Society for the Humanities
- Sociology
- Spanish
- Statistical Science
