= Rose Goldsen =

American professor (1917–1985)

Rose Kohn Goldsen (May 19, 1917 – August 2, 1985) was a professor of sociology at Cornell University and a pioneer in studying the effects of television and popular culture.

Prior to coming to Cornell, Goldsen worked for the Office of Radio Research, Columbia University Bureau of Applied Social Research. Goldsen came to Cornell as a research associate and felt that she encountered employment discrimination because she was a woman. In 1958, a faculty position opened up and she demanded to be considered, resulting in her appointment to the faculty.

Goldsen studied the psychological effects of television on individuals and society. Most notably, Goldsen was a very visible critic of a congressionally mandated government study of the impact of television violence on children. When the study reported no ill effects, Goldsen was able to document that the television industry had stacked the study and that its results were suspect. Goldsen explained the importance of her studying television by noting, "it is still possible to turn off the television set. It is not possible to turn off the television environment."

Goldsen broadcast a series of 11 lectures on sociology over an Ithaca, New York radio stations, February to May 1974.

She also studied the attitudes of college students.

Goldsen was also active in Cornell University's governance and served on its University Senate.

Cornell Library's archive of new media art is named in her honor.

== Books ==
- C. Wright Mills Clarence Senior Rose Kohn Goldsen (1950). Puerto Rican Journey: New York's Newest Migrants. Harper & Brothers. ASIN B000R0CVSW.
- Goldsen, Rose K. (May 1955). Factors related to acceptance of innovations in Bang Chan, Thailand: Analysis of a survey conducted by the Cornell Cross-Cultural Methodology Project, (Interim reports series). Cornell University. ASIN B0007GR2RG.
- Rose K. Goldsen; et al., eds. (1960). What College Students Think. Princeton, New Jersey: D. Van Nostrand Co.
- Adeline G. Levine, Rose K. Goldsen (1982). Love Canal: Science, Politics, and People. Lexington Books. ISBN 978-0-669-04034-0.
- Goldsen, Rose K. (1977). Show and Tell Machine: How American Television Works and Works You over. Doubleday. ISBN 978-0-8037-8614-1.

== Essays ==
- Goldsen, Rose K. (1976). Literacy without books: Sesame Street.
