= Cornell Engineering Library =

Library in the Cornell University College of Engineering

- 42.4447819°N 76.4841869°W
- Location: Ithaca, New York, United States
- Type: Academic library
- Established: 1957
- Branch of: Cornell University Library

Other information
- Website: engineering.library.cornell.edu

The Cornell Engineering Library is a branch library of the Cornell University Library at Cornell University in Ithaca, New York, United States. It was built in 1957 and occupies the ground floor and two sub-levels of Carpenter Hall (named after Walter S. Carpenter, Jr.).

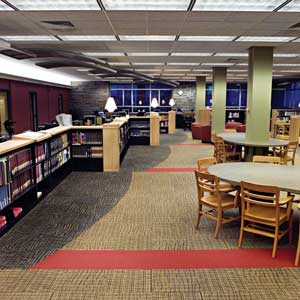

== History ==
The library was started with an endowment from Walter S. Carpenter, Jr., who was associated with E. I. du Pont de Nemours and Company from 1909 until his retirement as their chairman of the Board in 1962. Carpenter was a member of the Cornell mechanical engineering class of 1910 and also served as a member of the university's board of trustees. In the late 1800s there were smaller libraries housed in other buildings - civil engineering in Lincoln Hall; electrical engineering in Franklin Hall; and mechanical engineering in Sibley Hall.

== Collections ==
The library's physical collection consists of approximately 300,000 print volumes with another 100,000 volumes and 2 million technical reports in an off-site Library Annex. The Engineering Library's collections are tailored to research currently underway at Cornell and are described in the Engineering Library collection development policy.

== Conversion to virtual library ==
In 2011, the library transitioned to a virtual library and study space. High use print volumes were moved to other libraries on the Cornell campus: 20,000 volumes and course reserves were moved to Uris Library, and other low use items were moved to the Library Annex. This decision was based on recommendations from an advisory committee composed of four faculty, three librarians, two graduate students, and two undergraduates, and was announced in the Cornell Chronicle. As a result, the library has enhanced electronic collections such as e-journals, e-books, and society databases. The study space in Carpenter Hall is open around the clock for studying, and there are over 100 computers in the building.
