= Rachel Bean =

American astronomer

- Title: Professor of astronomy and senior associate dean of math and science, Cornell University College of Arts and Sciences
- Awards: Presidential Early Career Award for Scientists and Engineers; Cottrell Scholar Award; NASA Group Achievement Award

Academic background
- Education: University of Cambridge; Imperial College London

Academic work
- Discipline: Astronomy
- Sub-discipline: Dark energy
- Institutions: Cornell University

Rachel Bean is a cosmologist, theoretical astrophysicist, professor of astronomy, and senior associate dean for math and science at the College of Arts and Sciences at Cornell University.

== Education ==
Bean received her bachelor's degree in natural sciences from the University of Cambridge in 1995. After graduation, she worked in the strategy division at Accenture, and then obtained her master's degree in 1999 and doctorate degree in 2002 in theoretical physics from Imperial College London. Following this, she was a postdoctoral research Fellow for Princeton University before being hired as a professor for Cornell's Department of Astronomy.

== Career ==
In 2005, Bean became a faculty member at Cornell University, where her research focuses on cosmological tests of the nature of dark energy and gravity, and the physical origins of primordial inflation, using data from large-scale structure and the cosmic microwave background. She is actively involved in a number of international astronomical surveys, including the Large Synoptic Survey Telescope (LSST), the Dark Energy Spectroscopic Instrument (DESI), and the Euclid space mission.

During her time at Cornell University, Bean served as the Senior Associate Dean for the university's Undergraduate Education department, where she was responsible for designing the curriculum, overseeing admissions into the program, and career development, among other things. On July 13, 2023, Bean succeeded Ray Jayawardhana as interim dean of the College of Arts and Sciences at Cornell University, where she was later named the Senior Associate Dean for Math and Science. While she held this position within the university, she was partially responsible for introducing the data science minor to the school's Undergraduate Program.

== Involvement ==
=== Astronomical Experiments ===
- Vera Rubin Telescope (LSST)
- Dark Energy Spectroscopic Instrument (DESI)
- Euclid and Roman Space Telescope missions. (NASA)

=== Sub-Millimeter Experiments ===
- Atacama Cosmology Telescope (ACT)
- Simons Observatory
- Fred Young Submillimeter Telescope (FYST)

During her time spent on her many collaborative experiments, Bean was the collaboration leader on the LSST Dark Energy Science Collaboration, which involved more than 500 international scientists. She also served as a member of the U.S. Astronomy and Astrophysics Advisory Council.

== Awards ==
- 2007 NASA Group Achievement Award (for the results of the WMAP mission)
- 2008 Cottrell Scholar Award, Research Corporation.
- 2010 Presidential Early Career Award for Scientists and Engineers (PECASE)
- 2012 Gruber Prize in Cosmology, for the results of the Wilkinson Microwave Anisotropy Probe (WMAP) mission
- 2016 Fellow, American Physical Society
- 2018 Breakthrough Prize in Fundamental Physics (for the results of the WMAP mission)
