= Charles W. Wason =

- Born: April 20, 1854
- Died: April 15, 1918 (aged 63)
- Occupations: Engineer, Company President
- Known for: The Charles W. Wason Collection at Cornell University

Charles W. Wason (1854–1918) was an engineer, Orientalist, philanthropist and bibliophile.

Wason was born on April 20, 1854, in Cleveland. His father was a banker. After schooling at the Guildford Academy, he studied for a degree in mechanical engineering at Cornell University from 1872 to 1876, returning to Cleveland after his graduation to take a job with the East Cleveland Railway Company. He rose through the ranks to eventually become president of the Cleveland, Painesville & Eastern Railway Company, as well as running other utility companies.

Wason developed a deep interest in China after he and his wife visited the country in 1903. This interest persisted, and after Sarah Pike Conger's Letters From China was given to him six years later by his wife's mother, he devoted himself to collecting English-language works on China. He began to amass a considerable collection, but ill-health forced him to turn over the acquisition of new items to his friend Arthur H. Clark. Clark, a publisher by trade, expanded the collection by around 9,000 volumes, including works in Chinese, French, Spanish and Portuguese. A ballroom in Wason's house, decorated with Chinese imagery, was converted into a library for the collection.

Wason died on April 15, 1918, at age 63. His collection was bequeathed to his alma mater, Cornell University. His will also stipulated an endowment of $50,000 for the acquisition of new titles for the collection.
