= Irit Batsry =

American video artist

- אירית בצרי
- Born: 1957 (age 68–69)
- Education: Bezalel Academy of Arts and Design
- Occupations: Visual and Installation Artist

Irit Batsry (Hebrew: אירית בצרי; born 1957) is an Israeli-American visual and installation artist.

== Biography ==
Batsry graduated from the Bezalel Academy of Arts and Design in fine art in 1982. She moved to New York City, and became an instructor and on-line editor for Film/Video Arts.

Through her career she has produced experimental videos and installations that have been shown around the world including the National Gallery of Art in Washington D.C., The Biosphere in Montreal, the Musee de Arte in Rio de Janeiro and the Museo Nacional Centro de Arte Reina Sofia in Madrid. Her work is in the collections of The Museum of Modern Art, and The Whitney Museum of American Art, among others. Batsry has received numerous awards, notably the Bucksbaum Award for her work shown at the Whitney Museum's Biennial Exhibition in 2002.

She has lived and worked in New York since 1983.

Batsry's work displays ephemeral transitory images that are difficult to process rationally. Her interest in the notion of perception became more pronounced in the early 1990s when she studied the work of Buckminster Fuller, in particular his vision disorder that caused a near constant blurring of images. She produced several works inspired by Fuller including "A Simple Case of Vision" and "Of Persistence of Absence." Each examined the idea of distortion and perception through video and space.

== Awards ==
- 2002 Bucksbaum Award
- 1992 Guggenheim Fellowship
- 1996, 2001 Grand Prix Video de Création of the Société Civile des Auteurs Multimedia, Paris
- New York Fine Arts Foundation Fellow
- Jerome Foundation Fellow
- 1990, 1995 Grand Prix at Locarno
- 1994, 2001 First Prize at Vigo International Video Festival
- 1991 Best International Artistic Contribution at Cadiz
- 1989 First Prize at the Australian Video Festival
- 1989 First prize at the San Francisco Poetry Film Festival

== Works ==
- "Slightly less than a saint" (1982)
- trilogy "Passage to utopia"
  - "Stories from the old ruin" (1986), VHS.
  - "Leaving the old ruin" (1989)
  - "Traces of a presence to come" (1993), VHS.
- "Of persistence of absence" (1991)
- "A Simple Case of vision"(1991)
- "These Are Not my Images (neither there nor here)" (2000), VHS.
- "Beach at Nightfall", 2009
