= Laurence Gartel =

American artist

- Born: June 5, 1956 (age 70); North Shore Towers, Glen Oaks, Queens, U.S.
- Education: High School of Music & Art; School of Visual Arts; C. W. Post College
- Known for: Digital art
- Notable work: Art cars

Laurence Gartel (born June 5, 1956) is an American artist, considered a pioneer of digital art. His biography is included in Who's Who, Who's Who in the East, Who's Who in America, Who's Who in American Art, and Who's Who in the World.

== Education ==
Born and raised in New York City, Gartel attended the High School of Music & Art. He went to School of Visual Arts, along with graffiti artist Keith Haring, where he earned his BFA degree, majoring in graphics, and started his electronic career working side by side with Nam June Paik at Media Study/Buffalo in upstate New York. He had the opportunity to teach Andy Warhol how to use the Amiga computer.

== Career ==
His work has been exhibited at the Museum of Modern Art, the Joan Whitney Payson Gallery (Portland Maine), the Long Beach Museum of Art, the Princeton Art Museum, MoMA PS1, the Norton Museum of Art, and in the permanent collections of the National Museum of American History and the Bibliotheque Nationale.

Gartel has had many associations with musicians, including Debbie Harry (Blondie) Sid Vicious (Sex Pistols), Stiv Bators (Dead Boys) Johnny Thunders (New York Dolls), Ace Frehley (Kiss), and Wendy O Williams (Plasmatics). Gartel has created artwork for such pop culture stars as Justin Timberlake and Britney Spears. He was the official artist of the 57th Annual Grammy Awards. Gartel was the artist on the NASA Magnetospheric Multiscale Mission (MMS) launch at Kennedy Space Center on March 12, 2015. He was also the artist of the Newport Jazz Festival 2015. Gartel has created the official art for the Angel Awards, Monaco International Film Festival 2015.

One of Gartel's most memorable campaigns was the one he designed for Absolut Vodka in 1990, joining artists such as painter Andy Warhol and glass artist Hans Godo Frabel. These ads are considered to be the first digital art ads. Gartel has created groundbreaking artworks for the National Basketball Association, the Walt Disney Company, Forbes magazine, Coca-Cola, Philip Morris, and many others. Gartel was the Visionary of the 3D Print Conference in Santa Clara, California.

In 2025, Laurence Gartel became the Global Brand Ambassador for Robohood Inc., a company that uses an AI-powered robotic arm to produce imagery.

=== Art cars ===
Gartel has spent the last several years creating "art cars," the first one being commissioned by Tesla Motors during Art Basel Miami Beach in 2010. since then he has produced dozens of Art Cars in the form of Ferrari Scuderia, Rolls-Royce, classic 1957 Lincoln Premiere convertible, 1959 Cadillac Fleetwood Limousine, and others. Gartel was the "feature" of the 113th New York International Auto Show with his own pavilion at the Jacob Javits Center in 2013. His most recent Art Car is a Renntech Mercedes SL 65 V-12 Bi-turbo, unveiled at Fisher Island, Florida, during Art Basel Miami Beach, 2014. Gartel created the first National State Art Car at the Capitol Building in Concord, unveiling with New Hampshire Governor Maggie Hassan in the summer of 2015.
