= Uris Library =

- Cornell University
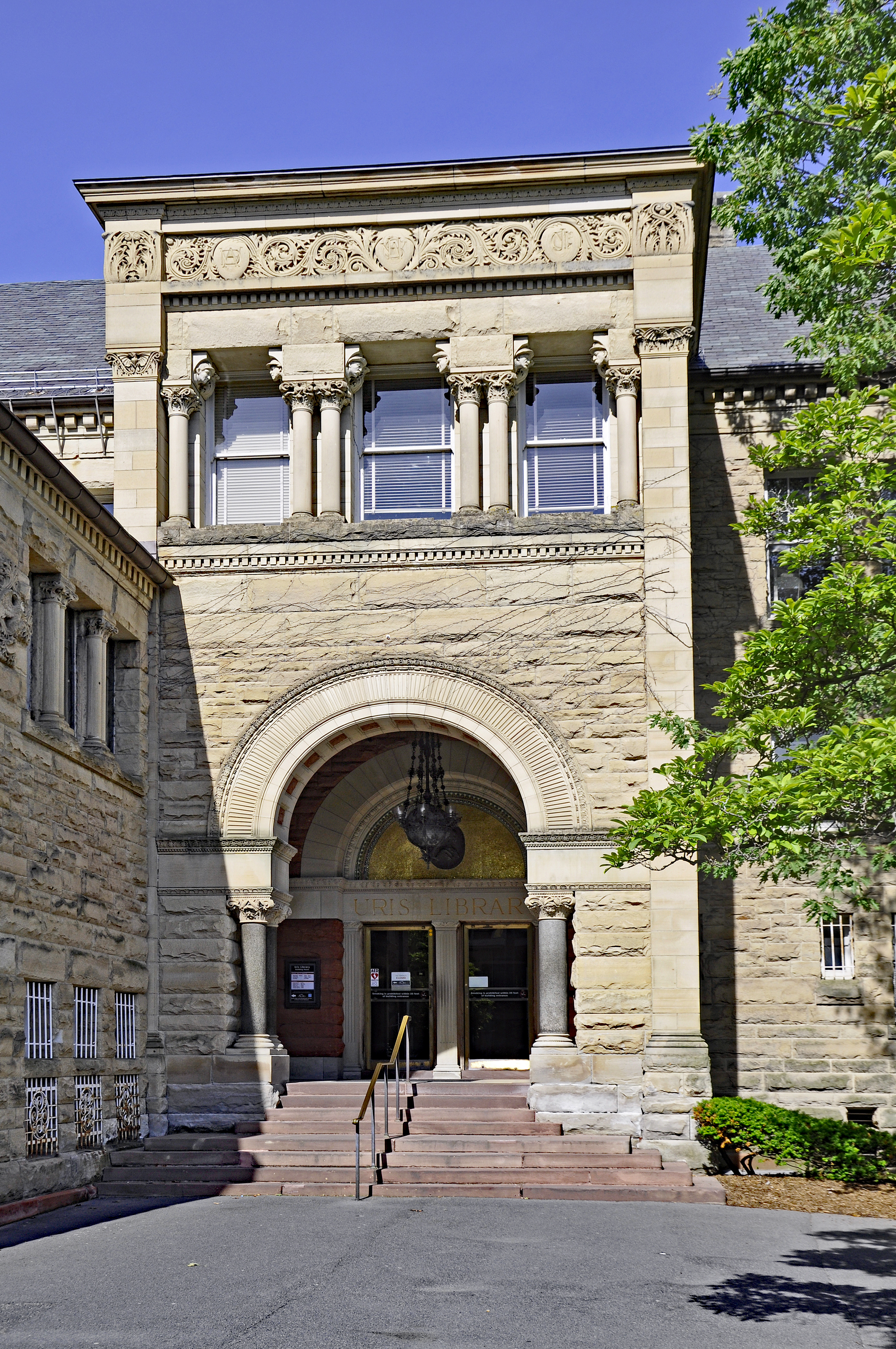
- Uris Library Entrance, c. 2015

General information
- Type: Academic Building; University Library
- Architectural style: Richardsonian Romansque
- Location: Ithaca, New York, U.S., 160 Ho Plaza, Ithaca, NY 14853
- Coordinates: 42°26′52″N 76°29′7″W
- Opened: 1891
- Owner: Cornell University

Design and construction
- Architect: William Henry Miller

Website
- https://olinuris.library.cornell.edu/

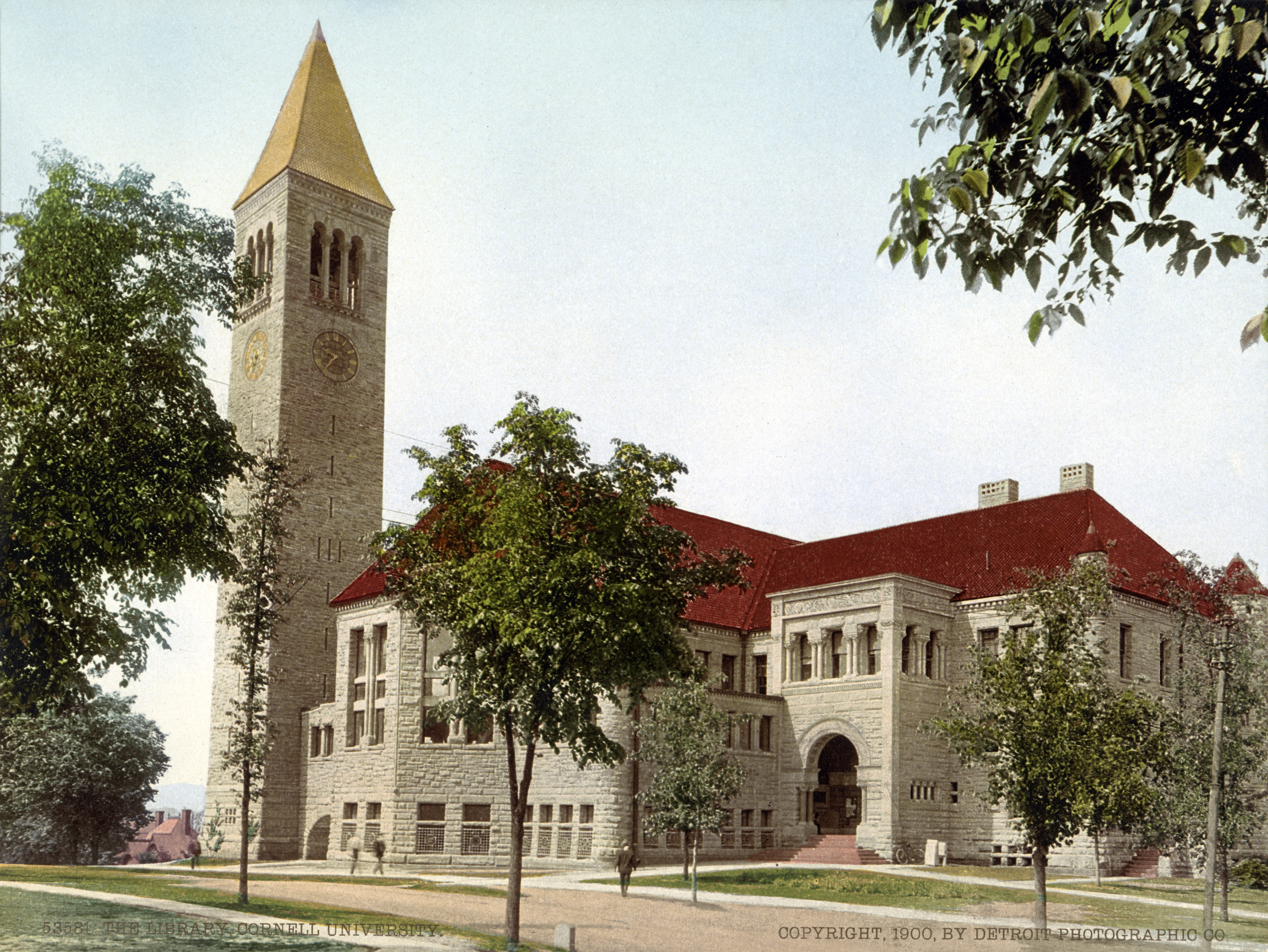
Uris Library, circa 1900

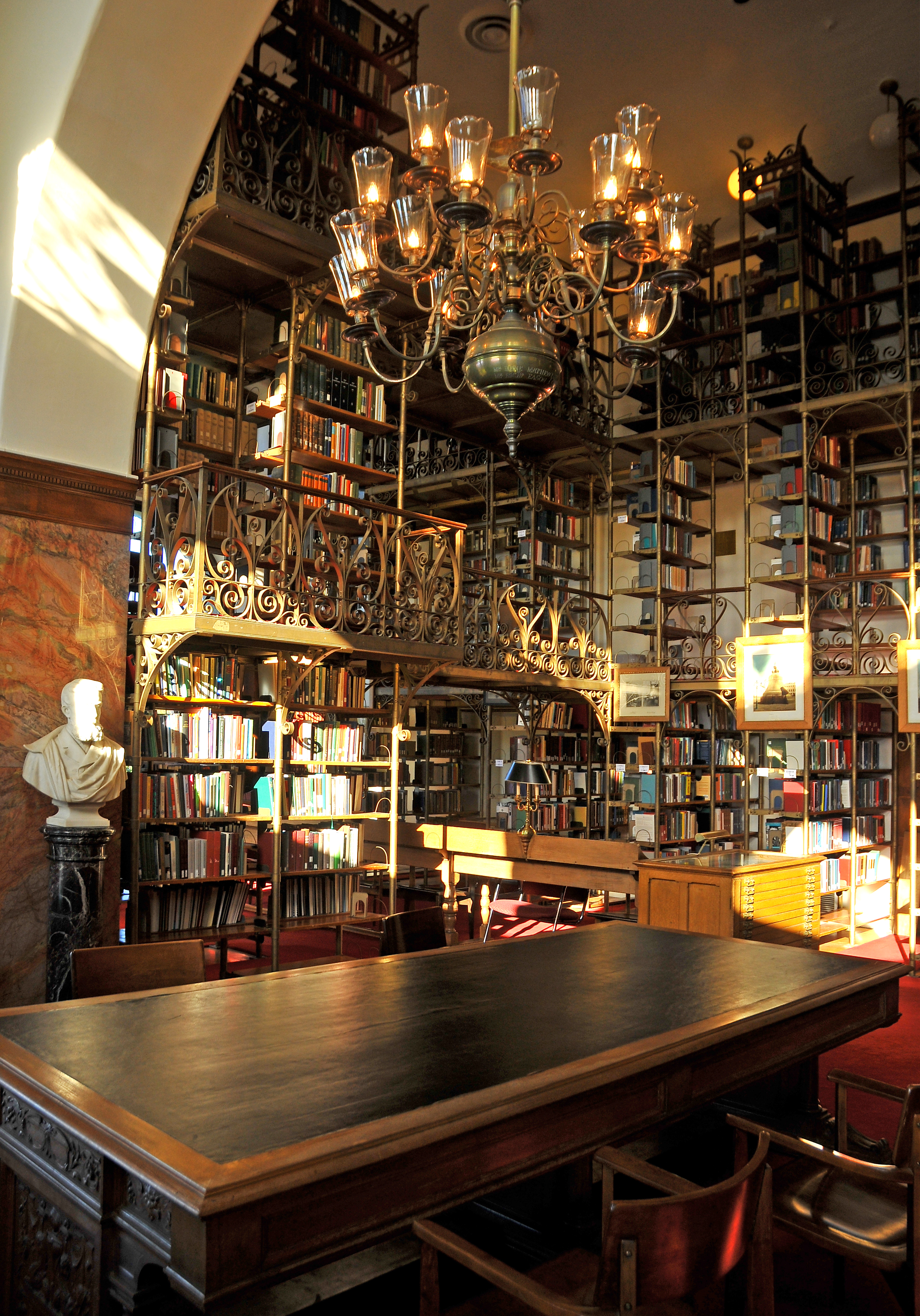
The A.D. White Library within Uris Library, c. 2010

Uris Library is a library on the campus of Cornell University, located at the southwest corner of the Arts Quad overlooking Libe Slope. The oldest library building at Cornell, Uris Library also houses the A. D. White Library, "a library within a library", named after the university's first president, Andrew Dickson White. The building included McGraw Tower that became a symbol of Cornell.

== History ==
=== 19th century ===
Uris Library was designed by Cornell's first architecture student, William Henry Miller. Opening in 1891, it was Cornell University's first library and was originally known as "The University Library." Built at a cost of $227,000 with a space for 400,000 books, the library was, at a time of construction, thought to be the finest college library in the United States.

=== The A.D. White Library ===
Andrew Dickson White had advocated for the construction of the building today known as Uris Library for decades, and donated his personal collection of 30,000 books--a donation which increased the size of the university's book collections by 50%. In response, trustees allocated a large room within the library to house White's collections. This room was so large, it was called a library and originally opened as the "President White Library of History and Political Science." This section of the building is today known as the A. D. White Library.

White collaborated with William Henry Miller to design the A. D. White Library as a cross-shaped room with three levels of stacks. The room features balconies and crosswalks covered in iron scrollwork on the upper levels, and spiral staircases in the corners. The wood floor was originally bare until a deep green carpet was added to dampen noise. It was not until the 1980s that the carpet was replaced with ruby red.

=== The Arthur H. Dean Room ===
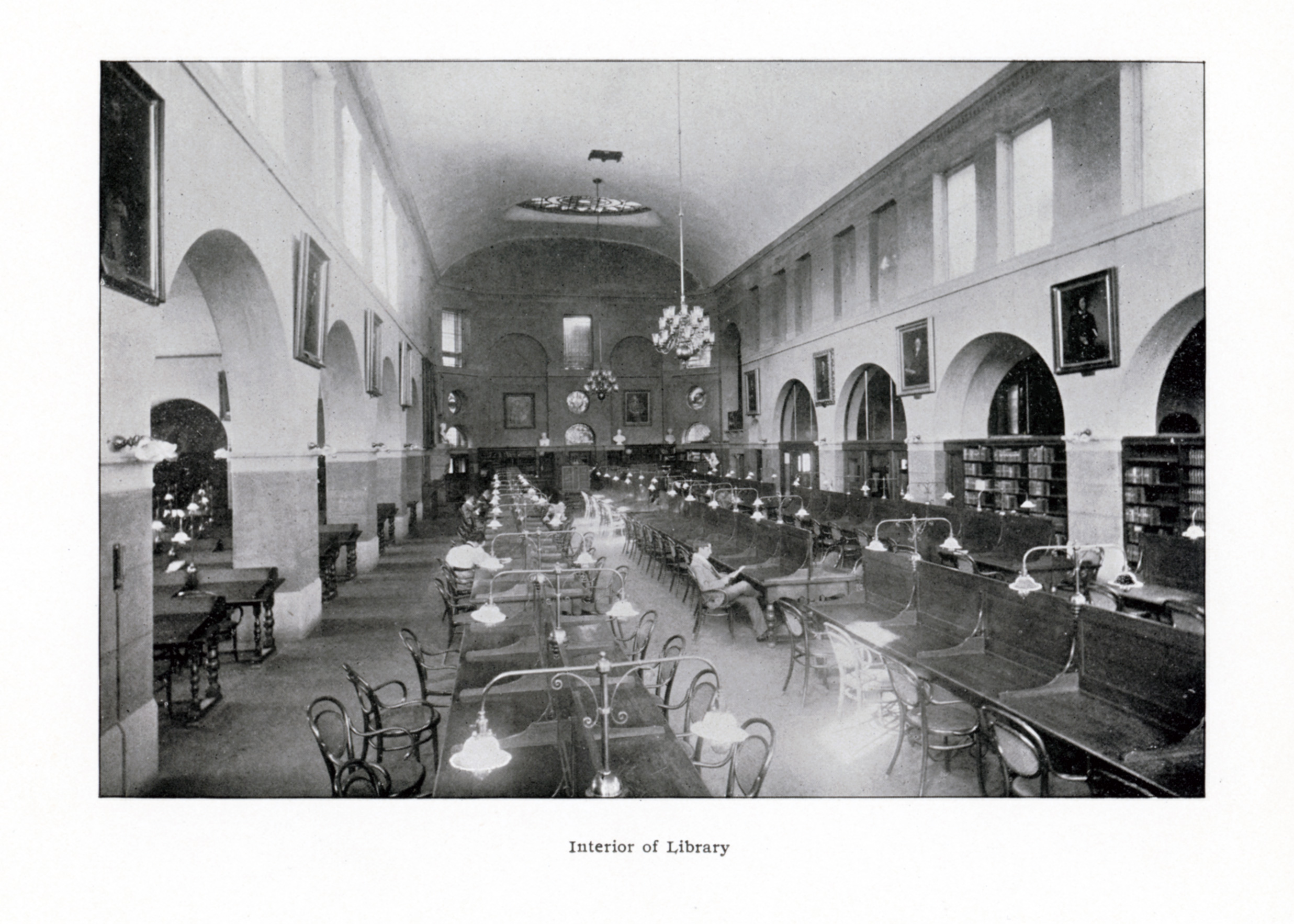
The Arthur H. Dean Room, c. 1905

Originally known as the General Reading Room, the Dean Room contains portraits of Ezra Cornell and Andrew Dickson White (the University's co-founders) as well as Cornell's past presidents.

=== 20th century ===
In 1962, the library was refurbished and renamed Uris Library after a donation from Harold Uris, who graduated from the university in 1925.

=== 21st century ===
In 2015 as part of an initiative to "Bring Back Light to A. D. White," new lighting fixtures and outlets were integrated into the A. D. White library to provide the library's users with the connectivity they need in the 21st century while preserving the historic character of the A. D. White Library.

== Sources ==
- Gibb, Arthur Norman (1890). The Library Building of the Cornell University (Thesis). Ithaca, New York: Cornell University.
- Hewett, W.T.; Holmes, F.R.; Williams, L.A. (1905). "The University Library". Cornell University, a History. Cornell University, a History. University Publishing Society. pp. 356–376.
- Engst, Elaine D. (2001). "Cornell University Library". International Dictionary of Library Histories. Taylor & Francis. pp. 283–286. ISBN 978-1-136-77785-1.
