= List of Cornell University buildings =

A list of significant buildings and facilities, existing or demolished, owned by or closely associated with Cornell University in Ithaca, New York. Several buildings were on the National Register of Historic Places, including Bailey Hall, Caldwell Hall, Computing and Communications Center (formerly Comstock Hall), East Roberts Hall (demolished), Fernow Hall, Morrill Hall, Rice Hall, Roberts Hall (Demolished), and Stone Hall (demolished). Also Telluride House, Deke House, and Llenroc.

Architects who are Cornell alumni are listed with their class year.

== Central (Main) campus ==
Academic, administrative, and athletics buildings between Cascadilla Gorge and Fall Creek Gorge.

Name	Image	Architect	Built	Location	Use and other notes	Ref
Andrew Dickson White House		William Henry Miller (B.Arch. 1872)	1874	121 Presidents Drive	Begun by Miller and finished by Babcock. Built for Andrew Dickson White and his family. South wing added in 1911.	
Anabel Taylor Hall		Starrett, Van Vleck & Marsh (Ernest A. Van Vleck, Class of 1897)	1953	548 College Avenue	Inside is a memorial to alumni killed in World War II	
Atkinson Hall		Lake Flato Architects	2024	354 Tower Road	Four-story building; 90,000 square feet; houses the Atkinson Center for a Sustainable Future	
Bailey Hall		Green and Wicks	1912	230 Garden Ave, Central Campus	Bailey Hall is the largest auditorium at Cornell University, seating 1324 people. Interior renovated 2006 by Mitchell|Giurgola Architects	
Baker Laboratory		Arthur N. Gibb (B.Arch 1890)	1921	259 Feeney Way	Donated by and named for banker George Fisher Baker (1840-1931), who was not a Cornell alum.	
Bard Hall		Shreve, Lamb & Harmon	1963	126 Hollister Dr	Bard is attached to the west end of Thurston Hall.	
Barnes Hall		William Henry Miller (B.Arch. 1872)	1887-1888	129 Ho Plaza	Cornell's first student union.	
Bartels Hall		Gwathmey Siegel & Associates Architects	1990	554 Campus Rd	Location of Newman Arena, home of the men's and women's basketball, volleyball, and wrestling teams	
Barton Hall		Lewis Pilcher	1915-1917	117 Statler Drive	Originally the New York State Armory and Drill Hall, it covers an area of over two acres	
Beebe Hall			1910	110 Plantations Road		
Big Red Barn		Cornell University	1874	135 Presidents Drive	Originally the A.D. White Carriage House. Extended in 1956.	
Biotechnology Building		Davis, Brody	1986	Biology Quad (526 Campus Road)		
Cornell Ann S. Bowers College of Computing and Information Science		Leers Weinzapfel Associates	expected Spring 2025	127 Hoy Road, south of Gates Hall (former location of Hoy Field)	Four-story building with two four-story wings forming an open angle "L" framing a shared green space with Gates Hall	
Boyce Thompson Institute for Plant Research		Ulrich Franzen	1978	533 Tower Road		
Bradfield Hall		Ulrich Franzen	1968	306 Tower Road		
Bruckner Hall		Carl & Robert Tallman; Carl Larson	1960	208 Mann Drive		
Caldwell Hall		Green and Wicks	1913	121 Reservoir Ave		
CALS Surge Facility		United States Army Corps of Engineers	1930	525 Tower Road	Toxic Chemical and Nematode Laboratory	
Carpenter Hall		Perkins and Will	1956	Engineering Quad (313 Campus Road)		
Clark Hall		Warner, Toan & Lunde	1965	142 Sciences Drive		
Computing and Communications Center		Green and Wicks	1912	Ag Quad (235 Garden Ave.)	Built for the Department of Home Economics, and originally known as Comstock Hall. The Home Economics College moved into Martha Van Rensselaer Hall in 1933, and Comstock became part of the College of Agriculture. Similar in design to Caldwell and Rice Halls.	
Comstock Hall		Levatich & Hoffman	1985	129 Garden Ave.		
Cornell Health		Conway L Todd	1956, 1979	110 Ho Plaza	Previously known as the Gannett Health Center. Built 1955-56 and designed by Conway L Todd. 1979 addition by Robert Macon Associates. A complete renovation and new addition by Chiang O’Brien along Campus Road was added in 2017.	
Cornell Health addition		Chiang O’Brien Architects (Grace Chiang 1980, B.Arch. 1981)	2017	242 Campus Road	Addition to Cornell Health along Campus Road was designed by Chiang O’Brien Architects, principal Grace Chiang '80, B.Arch'81	
Cornell Store		Earl Flansburgh (B.Arch 1952)	1970	135 Ho Plaza	Built underground. Won Progressive Architecture award in January 1969.	
Corson-Mudd Hall		Hugh Stubbins	Dedicated September 1982	215 Tower Road at Garden Avenue	Includes a four-story atrium, roof-top greenhouses, and 128 research labs.	
Day Hall		Frederick L. Ackerman	1947	144 Feeney Way	University administration	
Dolgen Hall ("ILR Extension Building")		Green and Wicks	1912	140 Garden Ave.	Built in 1911-1912 as an expansion of the Vet school, along with King-Shaw Hall. Rededicated "Dolgen Hall" in 2008.	
Duffield Hall		Rhoads Siegel	2004	343 Campus Rd., Engineering Quad		
East Campus Research Facility		Ballinger	2007	626 Tower Road		
Emerson Hall		Ulrich Franzen	1968	236 Mann Dr.		
Fernow Hall		Green and Wicks	1915	226 Mann Dr.	Similar to Roberts, East Roberts, Caldwell, and old Comstock Halls.	
Fischell Band Center		Baird Sampson Neuert	2013	141 Kite Hill Dr.	The Fischell Band Center was purpose-built for the Cornell Big Red Marching Band, and stands just outside the Schoellkopf Crescent.	
Foundry, The		Charles Babcock	1890	936 University Avenue, across from Milstein and Sibley	Originally housed foundry casting and sand molding equipment and served as a blacksmith shop for the engineering college; part of the Architecture school since 1960.	
Friedman Wrestling Center		CannonDesign	2003	610 Campus Road	Said to be the "nation's first dedicated wrestling center."	
Gates (Bill & Melinda) Hall		Morphosis Architects, design director Thom Mayne	2014	107 Hoy Rd.		
Goldwin Smith Hall		Carrère and Hastings	1904- 1906 232 Feeney Way	The 1892 Dairy Building was incorporated into Goldwin Smith Hall. In 2016, Klarman Hall was built against the rear of Goldwin Smith Hall.		
Grumman Hall		Perkins and Will	1957	Engineering Quad (134 Rhodes Dr)	Similar in style to Phillips (1955), Upson (1956), and Hollister (1957)	
Grumman Squash Courts		Cornell Univ; Wells, Koetter, Dennis	1953	505 Campus Road		
Ho Plaza		Jon Ullberg	1995	Central Campus	This section of Central Avenue name changed to Ho Plaza from Campus Road opposite College Ave to Uris Library and was converted to a pedestrian mall	
Hollister Hall		Perkins and Will	1957	Engineering Quad (527 College Avenue)	DeFrees Hydraulics Laboratory was added in 1982	
Hughes Hall		Eggers & Higgins	1963	Law School (241 Campus Road)	Renovated in 2017	
Human Ecology Building		Gruzen Samton/IBI Group	2011	37 Forest Home Drive		
Intercultural Center			1928	626 Thurston Avenue		
Ives Hall			1998	121 Tower Road		
Ives Hall East		Coffin & Coffin	1962	121 Tower Road	Low, horizontal building with flat roof. Formerly the site of the James Law Hall, Veterinary School	
Ives Hall West			1962	121 Tower Road	Renovated 2005 by Beckhard Richland Szerbaty + Associates	
Ives Hall Faculty Wing		William Haugaard, Perkins Eastman (Aaron Schwarz, B.Arch 1980)	1938	133 Statler Drive	Originally designed in a College Gothic style; completely renovated by Perkins Eastman	
Johnson Museum of Art		Pei Cobb Freed & Partners	1973	114 Central Ave	2007 northward underground extension by Pei Cobb Freed	
Kennedy Hall		Gwathmey Siegel & Associates Architects	1990	215 Garden Avenue	The south section is Kennedy, the north section is Roberts. Stone Hall was demolished to make way for this.	
Kimball Hall		Shreve, Lamb & Harmon	1951	Engineering Quad (134 Hollister Dr)	Eastern Pavilion of Thurston Hall	
King-Shaw Hall ("ILR Conference Center")		Green and Wicks	1912	140 Garden Avenue	Built in 1911-1912 as an expansion of the Vet school. Rededicated "King-Shaw Hall" in 2012. Designed after an eighteenth-century colonial estate	
Kinzelberg Hall		King + King Architects	1988	244 Garden Avenue	Nutritional Sciences	
Klarman Hall		Koetter, Kim and Associates (Alfred H. Koetter Jr., M.Arch. ’66 and Susie Sung-Hea Kim ’71, B.Arch. ’72)	2016	232 Feeney Way	The exterior rear of Goldwin Smith forms the west side wall of Klarman.	
Kroch Library		Shepley, Bulfinch, Richardson and Abbott	1992	Beneath the Arts Quad (216 Feeney Way)	A three-story underground library, accessible through Olin Library.	
Lincoln Hall		Charles Babcock	1888	Faces Arts Quad (256 Feeney Way)	Originally home of civil engineering and architecture; later shared by Theatre Arts and Music; now Music	
Lincoln Hall East Avenue addition		Shepley Bulfinch Richardson and Abbot	1998-2000	Faces East Avenue (256 Feeney Way)	Major expansion of Lincoln Hall along East Avenue for the Music Department	
Livestock Pavilion		Green and Wicks	1913	48 Judd Falls Rd.	Similar in style to Wing Hall	
Lynah Rink		Von Storch, Evans & Burkavage	1956	536 Campus Road	Renovated and expanded 2006 by Rossetti Architects	
Malott Hall		Warner, Burns, Toan & Lunde	1963	212 Garden Ave., across from Bailey Hall		
Mann Library building		Cornelius White	1953	237 Mann Dr.	Renovated June 2007 by Beyhan Karahan & Associates	
Mann Library addition		Edward Larrabee Barnes; Lee & Timchula (formerly Barnes & Lee)	2000	237 Mann Dr.		
Martha Van Rensselaer Hall		William Haugaard	1933	116 Reservoir Ave		
Martha Van Rensselaer Hall West Wing		John Snyder Architects	2005	27 Forest Home Drive		
McGraw Hall		Archimedes Russell	1872	Arts Quad (141 Central Ave)	Originally housed the library and a Museum of Zoology	
McGraw Tower (University Chimes)			1891	160 Ho Plaza (part of Uris Library)	McGraw Tower stands 173 feet tall and contains 131 steps to the clock mechanism, and 30 more steps to the bell loft. The chimes were donated to Cornell by Jennie McGraw in 1868 and installed in McGraw Tower in 1891.	
Milstein Hall		Rem Koolhaas	2011	943 University Avenue	Connects to Rand and Sibley halls, and cantilevers over University Avenue.	
Morrill Hall		Harlow Wilcox & Cyrus K Porter	1868	Arts Quad (159 Central Ave)	The first academic building built for Cornell; when the university opened in 1868, Morrill and Cascadilla Hall were the only buildings on campus.	
Morrison Hall		James MacKenzie	1961	507 Tower Road	Designed to match Riley-Robb Hall	
Myron Taylor Hall		Jackson, Robertson & Adams	1932	524 College Ave		
Myron Taylor Hall Jane Foster Library Addition		Shepley Bulfinch	1989	514 College Ave	Addition built in 1987-89 to match Myron Taylor's College Gothic style. The addition includes a second tower, an atrium, library and office space.	
Nevin (Brian C.) Welcome Center		Baird Sampson Neuert	2010	124 Comstock Knoll Drive (Cornell Botanic Gardens)	Received 2010 Award of Excellence from Canadian Architect Magazine.	
Newman (Floyd R.) Laboratory		Skidmore, Owings & Merrill	1947	153 Sciences Drive	Opened as "Laboratory of Nuclear Studies."	
Olin Chemistry Research Laboratory		Wank, Adams & Slavin	1967	162 Sciences Drive		
Olin Hall		Shreve, Lamb & Harmon	1941	113 Ho Plaza	The first Engineering building outside Sibley Hall	
Olin Library		Warner, Burns, Toan & Lunde	1960	161 Ho Plaza	Boardman Hall was demolished to create space for Olin Library.	
Phillips Hall		Perkins and Will	1955	East end of the Engineering Quad; 116 Hoy Rd		
Physical Sciences Building		Koetter, Kim and Associates (Alfred H. Koetter Jr., M.Arch. ’66 and Susie Sung-Hea Kim ’71, B.Arch. ’72)	2010	245 Feeney Way	Connects Baker Lab and Clark Hall	
Plant Science Building and Greenhouses		Sullivan Jones	1930	East side of Ag Quad, 236 Tower Road		
Post (Kenneth) Laboratory		Charles S Kavecki	1961	512 Tower Road	Floriculture and ornamental horticulture	
Rand Hall		Gibb & Waltz	1912	947 University Ave	Originally contained the machine shop, pattern shop, and electrical laboratory; renovated 2018–2019.	
Rhodes (Frank H.T.) Hall		Gwathmey, Siegel	1990	136 Hoy Rd	Eight-story, narrow, triangular building along Cascadilla Gorge. Home of the Cornell University Center for Advanced Computing.	
Rice Hall		Green and Wicks	1912	Ag Quad (340 Tower Road)	One of the original Ag Quad buildings, in a similar style. Originally named Poultry Building.	
Riley-Robb Hall		Coffin & Coffin	1956	111 Wing Drive	Renovated 2005 by HOLT Architects	
Roberts Hall		Gwathmey Siegel & Associates Architects	1990	215 Garden Ave	The south section of this structure is known as Kennedy Hall, while the northern end is called Roberts Hall.	
Rockefeller Hall		Carrère and Hastings	1904- 1906	231 Feeney Way	1980 renovation by Levatich & Hoffman	
Sage Chapel		Charles Babcock	1875	147 Ho Plaza	The Sage Memorial Apse was added in 1898. The north transept was added in 1904.	
Sage Hall		Charles Babcock	1875	114 Feeney Way	First women's dorm at Cornell; later graduate dorms and Career Center; later home to Johnson School of Management. A northeast addition was built in 1896. The tower was damaged in a storm and removed in the 1950s, and restored in a 1996 renovation.	
Sage Hall Addition		Hillier Group	1996-1998	114 Feeney Way	Renovated for SC Johnson School of Management	
Savage Hall		Barr & Lane	1945-1948	244 Garden Ave	1988 addition by King + King Architects	
Schoellkopf Crescent		Gibb & Waltz	1914	145 Kite Hill Drive	Crescent design with arches was added in 1923.	
Schoellkopf House		J Victor Bagnardi	1971	521 Campus Road	One-story square building on the east side of Schoellkopf Hall	
Schoellkopf Memorial Hall		Gibb & Waltz	1913	521 Campus Road	Italian Renaissance building with hipped roof. Renovated 2005 by Sasaki Associates.	
Schurman Hall		Isadore Rosenfield	1957	Veterinary School (602 Tower Road)	Three-story structure with flat roof	
Sibley West		Archimedes Russell	1871 (June)	Arts Quad/921 University Avenue	Sibley Hall was built in three distinct stages as the Sibley College of Mechanical Engineering and the Mechanic Arts. The West building was built first, in three stories; expanded to five in 1884.	
Sibley East		Charles Osborne	1894	Arts Quad/921 University Avenue	Built in 1894 "almost an exact replica" of Sibley West; in 1902 the two were joined by Sibley Dome.	
Sibley Dome		Gibb and Waltz (Arthur N Gibb '91)	1902	Arts Quad/University Avenue	East Sibley and West Sibley were connected in 1902 by this middle building, which contained a dome, large auditorium, and museum.	
Snee Hall		Perkins and Will	1984	Contains the department of Earth and Atmospheric Sciences, as well as a geology museum.		
Space Sciences Building		The Ballinger Company	1967	122 Sciences Drive	In 1987 the Ithaca firm Holt Architects added two floors to the top of the building.	
Statler Hall						
Statler Hotel		David Sheffield (The Architects' Cooperative)	1989	130 Statler Dr	The earlier Statler Inn stood on this site; it was demolished and a larger hotel built on the same site in 1989 and rechristened the Statler Hotel.	
Stimson Hall		William Henry Miller	1902	204 Feeney Way	Originally built for the Ithaca Division of the Cornell University Medical College, whose main building was located in New York City.	
Stocking Hall West		Lewis Pilcher	1923	411 Tower Road	Beaux-Arts style with mansard roofs; extended 1964; interior renovation by Ulrich Franzen in 1968.	
Stocking Hall East Addition		Mitchell|Giurgola Architects	2015	Tower Road	79,000-foot glass and steel extension replaces an older extension on the same site; won the 2017 AIA New York State Excelsior Honor Award for Public Architecture.	
Teagle Hall		Francis Day Rogers and Jonathan Fairchild Butler	1951	512 Campus Road		
Thurston Hall		Shreve, Lamb & Harmon	1951	Engineering Quad (130 Hollister Dr)	Red brick and limestone. An addition is planned for 2023-2024.	
Tjaden Hall		Charles Babcock	1883	Arts Quad (909 University Avenue)	Originally Franklin Hall, was home to chemistry and physics; later it became the electrical engineering building; renamed for donor and architect Olive Tjaden in 1981. The steeple was damaged by a storm in the 1950s, and restored in September 1997; the building's interior was gutted and renovated at that time.	
Upson Hall		Perkins+Will	1956	SE corner of Engineering Quad (124 Hoy Road)	Extensively renovated 2016–2017, also by Perkins+Will	
Uris Hall		Gordon Bunshaft (Skidmore, Owings & Merrill)	1973	Central Campus (109 Tower Road)	A Cor-Ten steel and glass box.	
Uris Library		William Henry Miller (B.Arch. 1872)	1891	160 Ho Plaza	McGraw tower was renovated in 1999	
Veterinary Medical Center			1995	930 Campus Road		
Veterinary Research Tower		Ulrich Franzen	1974	618 Tower Rd	Reclad and redesigned in 2019 by Weiss/Manfredi	
Ward Lab		Vitro Engineering Company	1963	Engineering Quad (153 Hollister Drive)		
Warren Hall		William Haaughard	1933	Ag Quad (137 Reservoir Ave)	1958 addition connected Warren with Mann Library	
Weill Hall		Richard Meier (B.Arch 1957)	2008	Biology Quad (237 Tower Road)	263,000-square-foot building for the life sciences	
White Hall		Harlow M Wilcox & Cyrus K Porter	1866-1869	Arts Quad (123 Central Avenue)	Second building on campus. Renovated 2000-2003 by Peter Gisolfi Associates (interior gutted to create atrium).	
Willard Straight Hall		William Adams Delano	1925	136 Ho Plaza	Originally the large north entrance was for men, the smaller south entrance for women. Extension added 1954.	
Wilson Synchrotron Laboratory		Robert R. Wilson	1967	167 Synchrotron Drive	Cornell faculty Robert Wilson designed the Cornell Synchrotron, and later designed Fermilab.	
Wing Hall		Green and Wicks	1913	Ag Quad (123 Wing Drive)		

== West Campus, Collegetown, and Downtown ==
The Gothic dormitories on West Campus were originally established as the men's residence area. The Class Halls and Noyes Community Center were built behind the Gothics after World War II. The West Campus Initiative demolished the Class Halls and old Noyes between 2005-2008 and in their place were built the Bethe, Rose, Becker, and Keeton residences and Noyes Recreation Center.

Building	Image	Architect	Built	Location	Use and other notes	Ref
Baker Hall / Baker Tower		Frank Miles Day & Charles Zeller Klauder	1913	356 West Ave	Donated by and named for banker George Fisher Baker (1840-1931), who was not a Cornell alum.	
Becker (Carl) House		KieranTimberlake	2006	647 Stewart Ave	Built as part of the "West Campus Initiative."	
Bethe (Hans) House		KieranTimberlake	2007	314 West Ave	Built as part of the "West Campus Initiative."	
Boldt Hall		Charles Klauder	1921	727 University Ave	Day & Klauder designed all the West Campus buildings between 1913 and 1931. The firm was just Klauder after Day died in 1918.	
Cascadilla Hall		Nichols & Brown	1866	115 Cascadilla Place	Originally built as a water-cure sanitarium and school for women doctors; it was acquired by Cornell in 1868. It is the oldest building at Cornell. Remodeled in 1913.	
Central Heating Plant			2001	651 Dryden Road		
Collyer Boathouse			1957	685 Third St (on Cayuga Inlet)	Expansion and renovation 2010-2011 by HGA Architects	
Deke House		William Henry Miller	1893	13 South Ave	Delta Kappa Epsilon fraternity house.	
Eddy Gate; formally the "Andrew Dickson White Memorial Gate"		William Henry Miller (B.Arch. 1872)	1896	End of Eddy Street behind Cascadilla Hall	Located next to Cornell's oldest building, Cascadilla, it was originally constructed to be the southern entrance to campus. After construction of the College Ave bridge, Eddy Gate now welcomes visitors to the Cascadilla parking lot. Alternating layers of reddish-hued Berea limestone and white Ohio sandstone are meant to evoke the school's red and white colors.	
Founders Hall		Frank Miles Day & Charles Zeller Klauder	1914	352 West Ave	Founders Hall was the second of the West Campus men's dormitories (women lived on North Campus). Day & Klauder designed all the West Campus Gothic buildings between 1913 and 1931.	
Hartung–Boothroyd Observatory			1974	553 Mount Pleasant Rd, Dryden, New York	Used mainly as a teaching facility for upper-level undergraduate astronomy classes	
Kahin Center (Treman House)		William Henry Miller	1902	640 Stewart Ave	Originally home of Robert Henry Treman. Since 1992, George McT. Kahin Center for Advanced Research on Southeast Asia	
Keeton (William) House		KieranTimberlake	2005	4 Forest Park Ln	Built as part of the "West Campus Initiative."	
Llenroc		Nichols & Brown	1867-1875	100 Cornell Ave	Built as Ezra Cornell's mansion. Sold to Delta Phi fraternity in 1911.	
Lyon/McFaddin/War Memorial		Charles Klauder	1928	336 West Ave	Lyon and McFaddin towers originally represented the Army and Navy, respectively.	
Mennen Hall		Charles Klauder	1931	342 West Ave	Mennen Hall was the final West Campus residence hall constructed in College Gothic style.	
Noyes Community and Recreation Center		KieranTimberlake	2007	306 West Ave	Fitness center, climbing wall, air hockey tables, basketball court, game center, and convenience store.	
Robison (Doris) Boathouse		685 Third St		Cayuga Inlet	Remodeled and rededicated in 2011	
Rose (Flora) House		KieranTimberlake	2006	134 Gothics Way	Built as part of the "West Campus Initiative."	
Sage House		William Henry Miller	1876	118 Sage Place	Mansion built for Henry W. Sage, donated to the university after Sage's death for use as an infirmary.	
Schuyler House			1840/1911	112 Sage Place	Originally served as the campus infirmary, later used for student housing. A large addition was added in 1911.	
Schwartz Performing Arts Center		James Stirling and Michael Wilford	1989	430 College Ave	Performing arts education, professional training and public performance	
Sheldon Court		Charles Lacy Sheldon	1902	420 College Ave	Originally a private dormitory for men with shops on the first floor, it was willed to Cornell by Charles Sheldon in 1914. Renovated 1982.	
Telluride House		William H. Lepper	1910	217 West Ave	A residential intellectual society	
Von Cramm Cooperative Hall		Ernest A. Van Vleck, B.Arch 1897	1955	623 University Ave	A student operated house.	

== North Campus ==
North Campus was originally established as the location for women's residences, starting with Risley, Donlon, and Dickson Halls. A suite system was introduced with the construction of five Low Rises, two High Rises, and Robert Purcell Union, built between 1969-1975 and designed by Gyo Obata of Hellmuth, Obata and Kassbaum. The 2001 North Campus Residential Initiative attempted to bring "order to the chaos" of North Campus. 2021-2022 saw the North Campus Residential Expansion (NCRE), a 776,000 square-foot complex which included five residence halls, a dining hall, and fitness center.

Building	Image	Architect	Built	Location	Use and other notes	Ref
Anna Comstock House			1925	520 Thurston Ave	Home to the Latino Living Center.	
Balch Hall		Frederick L. Ackerman	1929	600 Thurston Ave	Balch is a collection of four 80-student residence halls around a central courtyard.	
Clara Dickson Hall			1946	21 Sisson Place	Named for A.D. White's mother; 168,791 sq ft; "over 540" beds	
Fuertes Observatory		L.P. Burnham, Cornell Professor of Architecture	1917	209 Cradit Farm Drive	The current building is "the fourth or fifth" astronomical observatory on the Cornell campus	
Helen Newman Hall			1963	163 Cradit Farm Drive	Opened in summer 1963 as the Women's Gymnasium (Teagle was the Men's gym). Features bowling alleys and swimming pool.	
High Rise 5		Gyo Obata	1975	225 Jessup Road		
Holland Living Center (Low Rise 8)		Gyo Obata	1975	128 Program House Drive		
Jameson (George) Hall (High Rise 1)		Gyo Obata	1975	44 Sisson Pl		
Just About Music (JAM); Low Rise 9		Gyo Obata	1975	142 Program House Dr		
Low Rise 6		Gyo Obata	1975	237 Jessup Rd		
Low Rise 7		Gyo Obata	1975	116 Program House Drive		
Mary Donlon Hall			1961	57 Sisson Place	Renovated by Holt Architects in 2003	
Noyes Lodge			1958	616 Thurston Ave	Built in 1958 as a dining hall, known for many years as "The Pancake House." 2018 renovation by JMZ Architects redesigned Noyes as the Martin Y. Tang Welcome Center.	
Risley Hall		William Henry Miller (B.Arch. 1872) and Phillips H. Mallory	1913	535 Thurston Avenue	Originally opened to accommodate the growing enrollment of women,	
Robert Purcell Community Center		Gyo Obata	1975	217 Jessup Road	Interior renovation by QPK Design	
Ujamaa (Low Rise 10)		Gyo Obata	1975	68 Sisson Pl	A long rectangular building with projecting wings	

=== North Campus Housing Initiative; 2000-01 ===
Plan by Dagit Saylor Architects; built to house first-year students. Originally "Court Resort" was named as a single building, but later rededicated as three (connected) buildings in honor of campus gifts. Construction began March 2000, completed August 2001.

Name	Image	Architect	Built	Location	Use and other notes	Ref
Appel Commons		Dagit Saylor Architects	2000	186 Cradit Farm Dr	Dining, fitness center	
Bauer Hall		The Hillier Group	2000	148 Cradit Farm Dr	Part of the Court–Kay–Bauer Community (CKB); 30,504 sq ft	
Court Hall		The Hillier Group	2000	148 Cradit Farm Dr	Part of the Court–Kay–Bauer Community (CKB); 30,076 sq ft	
Kay Hall		The Hillier Group	2001	148 Cradit Farm Dr	Part of the Court–Kay–Bauer Community (CKB); 29,775 sq ft	
Mews Hall		The Hillier Group	2000	172 Cradit Farm Dr	87,129 sq ft; 260+ beds	

=== North Campus Residential Expansion (NCRE); 2021-2022 ===
The 776,000 square-foot complex consists of five three- to five-story residential courtyard buildings, a dining hall and fitness center. The entire complex was designed in similar styles by ikon.5 Architects and opened in 2021 and 2022.

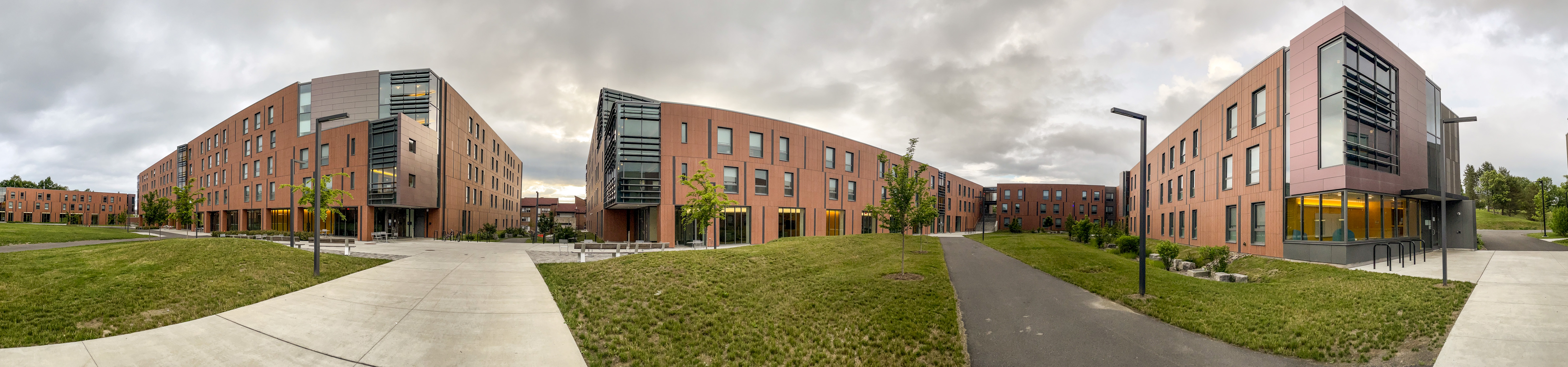
Far left: McClintock Hall. Left: Ginsburg Hall. Center and right: Hu Shih Hall.

Name	Image	Architect	Built	Location	Use and other notes	Ref
Ganędagǫ: Hall		ikon.5 Architects	2021	117 Jessup Place	190,784 sq ft; 577 beds; the name honors the Cayuga Nation of New York	
Toni Morrison Hall		ikon.5 Architects	2021	18 Sisson Place	178,869 sq ft; 314 beds; Building includes Morrison Dining Hall	
Barbara McClintock Hall		ikon.5 Architects	2022	224 Cradit Farm Dr	103,835 sq ft; 311 beds	
Hu Shih Hall		ikon.5 Architects	2022	141 Program House Dr	138,773 sq ft; 429 beds	
Ruth Bader Ginsburg Hall		ikon.5 Architects	2022	155 Program House Dr	162,849 sq ft; 504 beds	

== Demolished or former buildings ==
Building	Image	Architect	Built	Demolished	Location	Use and other notes	Ref
Bacon Baseball Cage			1913	1985	Between Hoy Field (Cornell) and Schoellkopf Field	Demolished to make room for press box and more seating; housed the first, live Touchdown mascot	
Boardman Hall		William Henry Miller (B.Arch. 1872)	1892	1958-59	Arts Quad	Housed the College of Law and the Departments of History and Government. Boardman Hall was torn down in 1958–59, and Olin Library was built in its place.	
Class Halls 1-6 (aka "University Halls")		Chapman, Evans & Delenhanty; Quinlivan, Pierik & Krause	1953	2003-2008	West Campus	Six dormitories built in the 1950s named for the Classes of 1917, 1918, 1922, 1926, 1928, and "Sperry Hall." Renovated in 1987. Demolished around 2003-2008 as part of the "West Campus Initiative," which replaced these with Hans Bethe, Flora Rose, Alice Cook, and Carl Becker Houses.	
Dairy Building (Incorporated into Goldwin Smith Hall)		Charles Osborne	1892	n/a	North end of Goldwin Smith Hall	The Dairy Building was incorporated into the north end of Goldwin Smith Hall in 1903.	
East Roberts Hall		George L. Heins; Morris Kantrowitz	1905	1990	Ag Quad	Demolished 1990	
Farm Management Building			1933	1951	Northeast corner of the Ag Quad	"The ... building matches the Plant Science laboratory in external appearance, both being constructed of Indiana-limestone and yellow brick." Demolished 1951 to make room for Mann Library.	
Hydraulic Laboratory			1898	1960s, 2009	Fall Creek gorge	A flood closed the lab in the 1960s, and in 2009 it collapsed into the gorge.	
James Law Hall			1896	1959		3-story building facing East Avenue. Included the College Museum. Built as Cornell's original veterinary school, it was demolished September 1959 to make room for Ives Hall.	
Japes Lodge			1922	2018		Tudor-style structure on Beebe Lake which housed a restaurant, the Johnny Parsons Club, plus a checking room for ice skaters, store, social room with fireplace, and hockey equipment room. Home to the Cornell Outing Club. The upper levels were removed in 1960, and the building was finally demolished in January 2018.	
McGraw-Fiske Mansion		William Henry Miller (B.Arch. 1872)	1896	1906	810 University Avenue	Destroyed by fire on December 7, 1906; The current Chi Psi fraternity house stands on its location	
Percy Field			1890	1922		Present site of Ithaca High School. Had baseball, track and football.	
Veranus A. Moore Laboratory of Pathology			1938	?	Present site of ILR School; next to James Law Hall.	Veterinary school. It was an L-shaped building of three stories and a basement. Cornell claimed it was the "best equipped structure of its kind in America."	
Morse Hall			1889	1916, 1954	Present site of Johnson Museum	Destroyed by fire February 13, 1916; afterward, the top two floors were removed and the two remaining levels were temporarily roofed. Finally town down 1954.	
Noyes Community Center		Todd & Giroux	1967	ca 2003-2008	West Campus	Dining and activity center for West Campus dormitories. Held a dining hall, billiard room, Demolished with the West Campus Initiative.	
Old Armory		Charles Babcock	1883	1957	Present site of Hollister Hall	Military hall and gymnasium. Enlarged 1892. It was the main venue on campus for events such as commencement and dances. Included a pool.	
Roberts Barn		Professor Isaac P. Roberts	1879	ca 1912	Ag Quad; present site of Computing and Communications Center	100 feet tall and "was a marvel in its time" with a "thresher and system of conveyors"	
Roberts Hall		George L. Heins; Morris Kantrowitz	1906	1990	Ag Quad	Demolished 1990	
Schoellkopf field west stands			1947	2016	Across from the Crescent, below the press box.	The stands were demolished 2016 due to "underuse and safety hazards."	
Statler Inn		Holabird & Root	1948	1987	130 Statler Drive	The original Statler Inn was built in 1948, renovated 1968, and demolished 1987. A newer, larger Statler Hotel was built on the same site.	
Stone Hall		George L. Heins; Morris Kantrowitz	1905	1986	Ag Quad	Home to the School of Education, which was dissolved in 1967. The building was demolished 1986.	
Toboggan Slide			1902	1949	Beebe Lake	The slide was removed in 1949 and the Toboggan Lodge remains on Forest Home Dr.	
