= Third National Bank (Syracuse, New York) =

Historic commercial building in New York, United States

- U.S. National Register of Historic Places
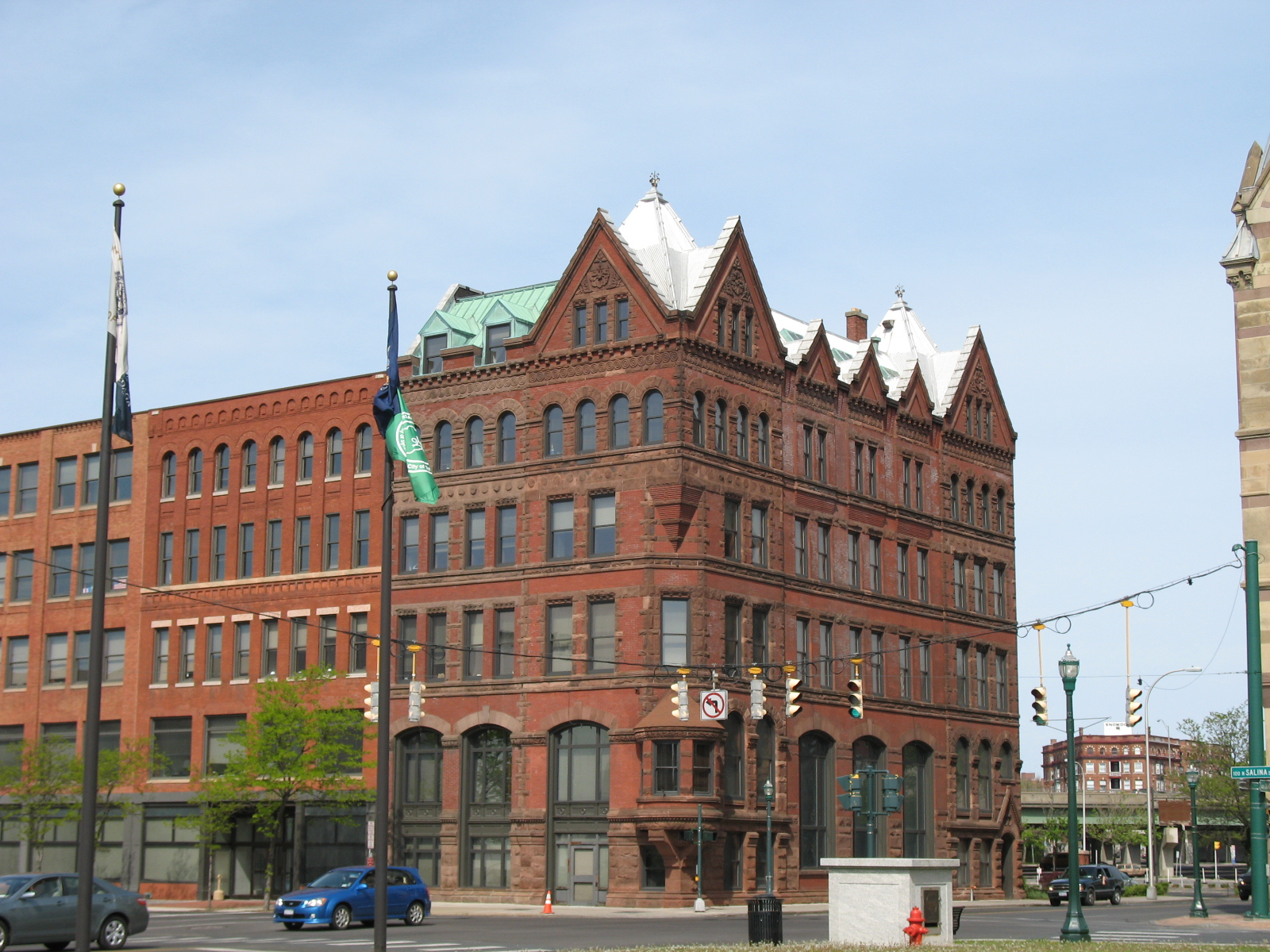

- Location within New York Location within the United States
- Location: 107 James St., Syracuse, New York
- Coordinates: 43°3′5″N 76°9′7″W
- Built: 1885
- Architect: Russell, Archimedes
- Architectural style: Queen Anne
- NRHP reference No.: 72000896
- Added to NRHP: September 22, 1972

The Third National Bank, also known as the Community Chest Building, is located on James Street in Syracuse, New York. It was designed by architect Archimedes Russell in 1885. It is significant for its architecture and for its role in commerce in Syracuse in the late eighteenth century. It was added to the National Register of Historic Places in 1972.

== See also ==
- Yule marble
