= C. W. Snow and Company Warehouse =

Historic commercial building in New York, United States

- C. W. Snow & Company Warehouse
- U.S. National Register of Historic Places
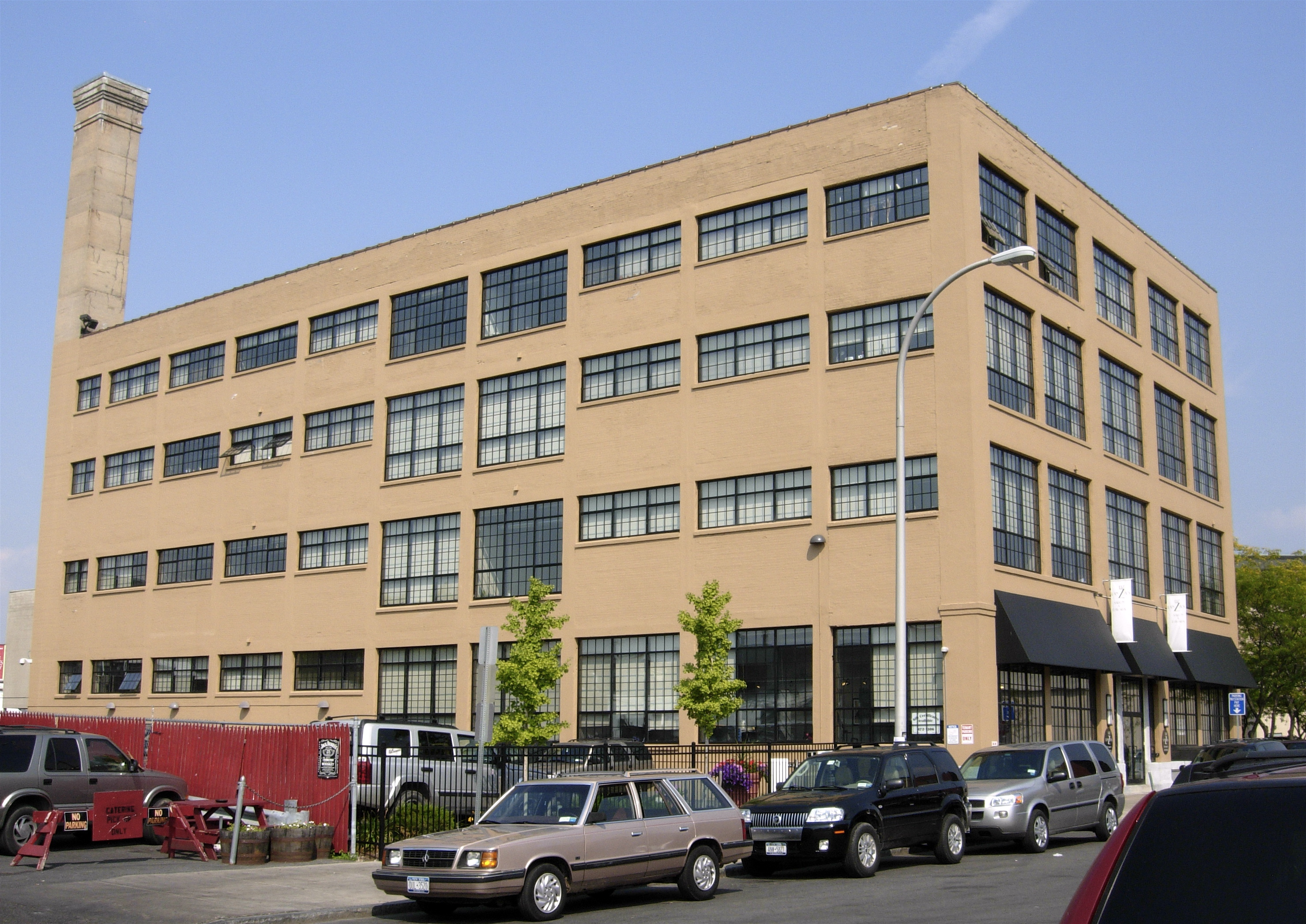

- Location within New York Location within the United States
- Location: 230 W. Willow St., Syracuse, New York
- Coordinates: 43.05264°N 76.15402°W
- Built: 1913
- Architect: Russell & King
- Architectural style: Modern Movement
- NRHP reference No.: 07000290
- Added to NRHP: April 12, 2007

The C. W. Snow and Company Warehouse was built in 1913. It was designed by Russell & King. It was listed on the National Register of Historic Places in 2007.

It was listed for its Modern Movement architecture.

The building was renovated extensively in recent years. Windows that had been bricked in were restored, and much more.
