= Niagara Mohawk Building =

Historic commercial building in New York, United States

- Niagara Hudson Building
- U.S. National Register of Historic Places
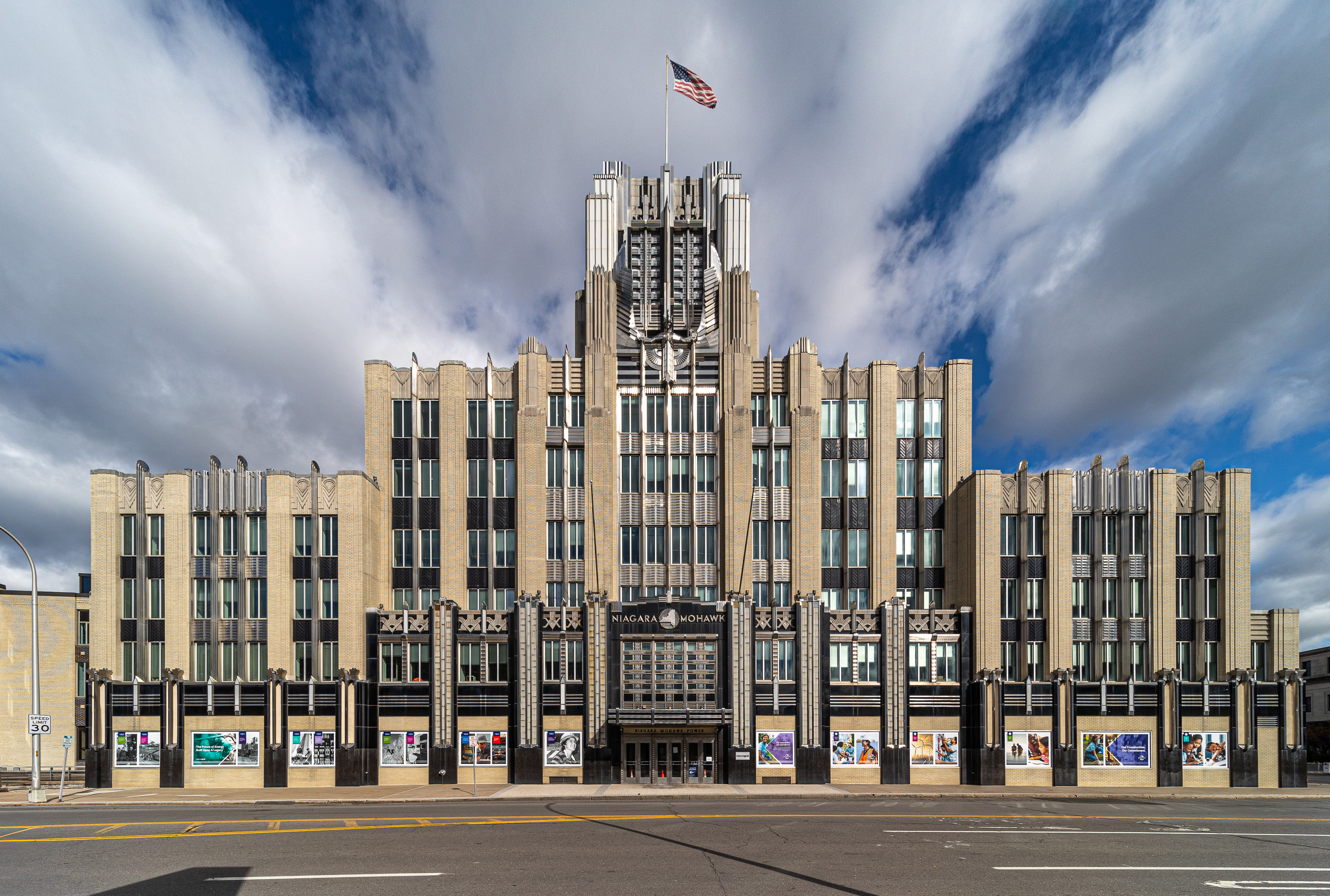
- Niagara Mohawk Building

- Location within New York
- Location: 300 Erie Boulevard West, Syracuse, New York
- Coordinates: 43°3′4.28″N 76°9′22.25″W
- Area: 5.26 acres (2.13 ha)
- Built: 1932
- Architect: Melvin L. King, Bley and Lyman
- Architectural style: Art Deco
- NRHP reference No.: 10000361
- Added to NRHP: June 14, 2010

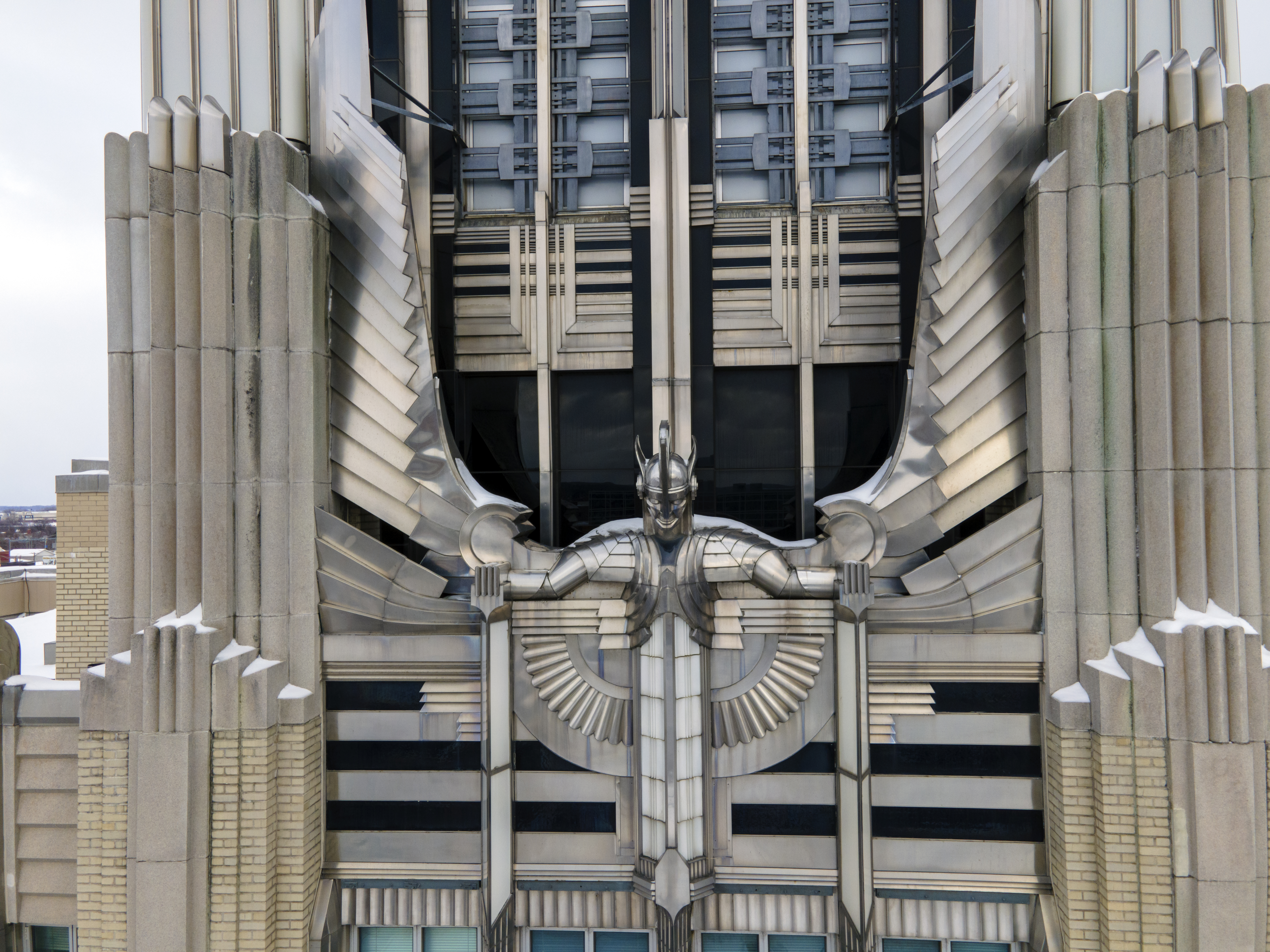
The art deco Niagara Mohawk Building in Syracuse, New York, 2022.

The Niagara Mohawk Building is an art deco classic building in Syracuse, New York. The building was built in 1932 and was headquarters for the Niagara Mohawk Power Corporation, what was "then the nation's largest electric utility company". The company has since been acquired by merger into National Grid plc.

The Art Deco building was designed by Syracuse architect Melvin L. King of King + King Architects in a consultation with Buffalo firm Bley and Lyman. The building's recessed stories resemble an ancient ziggurat or step pyramid, while other parts embrace modern technology and contemporary innovation. The steel and masonry structure is adorned with a 28-foot-tall (8.5 m) stainless steel statue called "The Spirit of Light" which depicts a winged figure representing of the spread of electricity. In between the display windows are tube lights, hidden behind chrome panels.

According to the National Park Service:

The Niagara Hudson Building in Syracuse is an outstanding example of Art Deco architecture and a symbol of the Age of Electricity. Completed in 1932, the building became the headquarters for the nation’s largest electric utility company and expressed the technology of electricity through its modernistic design, material, and extraordinary program of exterior lighting. The design elements applied by architects Melvin L. King and Bley & Lyman transformed a corporate office tower into a widely admired beacon of light and belief in the future. With its central tower and figurative winged sculpture personifying electric lighting, the powerfully sculpted and decorated building offered a symbol of optimism and progress in the context of the Great Depression.

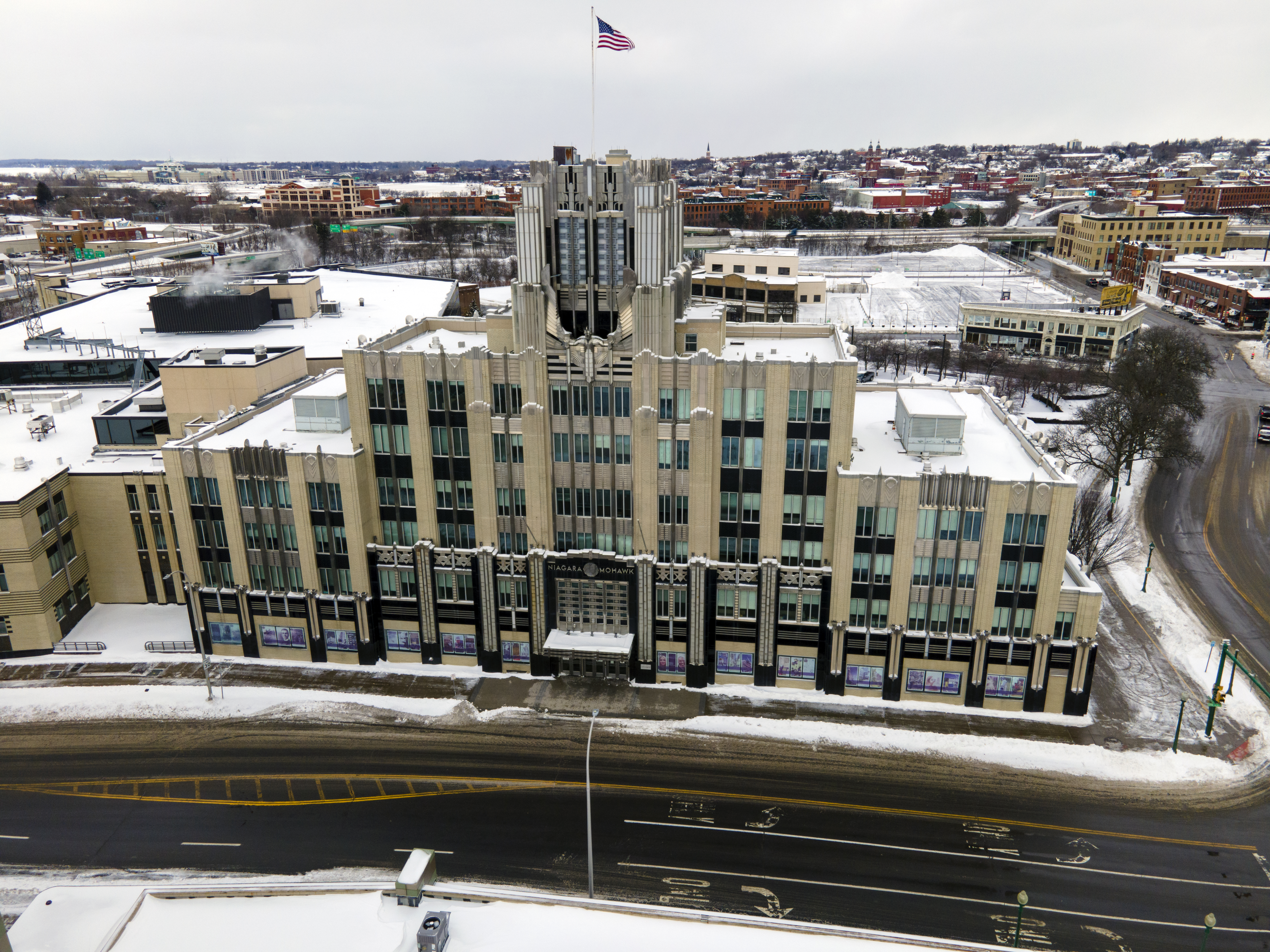
The art deco Niagara Mohawk Building in Syracuse, New York, on Tuesday, January 18, 2022.

During World War II, the exterior lights were turned off as part of wartime blackouts. A 1999 renovation restored the lighting system's original vitality and enabled it to light up the building in different colors, thanks to the work of lighting designer Howard Brandston. The new lighting system was unveiled in May 2000. This renovation also fixed several other exterior details. The Vitrolite panels were repaired, and look-alike glass panels were installed to replicate ones that were missing. The "Spirit of Light" statue was cleaned and polished, and rehabilitation crews remodeled the chrome nickel marquee.

The building was listed on the United States National Register of Historic Places in June 2010. It had been nominated by New York State's Board of Historic Preservation for listing on the National Register of Historic Places in December 2009.

In 2023, maintenance crews discovered an issue with the exterior lighting system in the upper portion of the building. The year after, in January, National Grid announced plans to repair and upgrade the lighting system, following a restoration of the roof and facade. The improved lighting system was formally inaugurated on December 17, 2024.
