= Court–Kay–Bauer Community =

Group of residence halls at Cornell University

Coordinates: 42.45417°N 76.47799°W

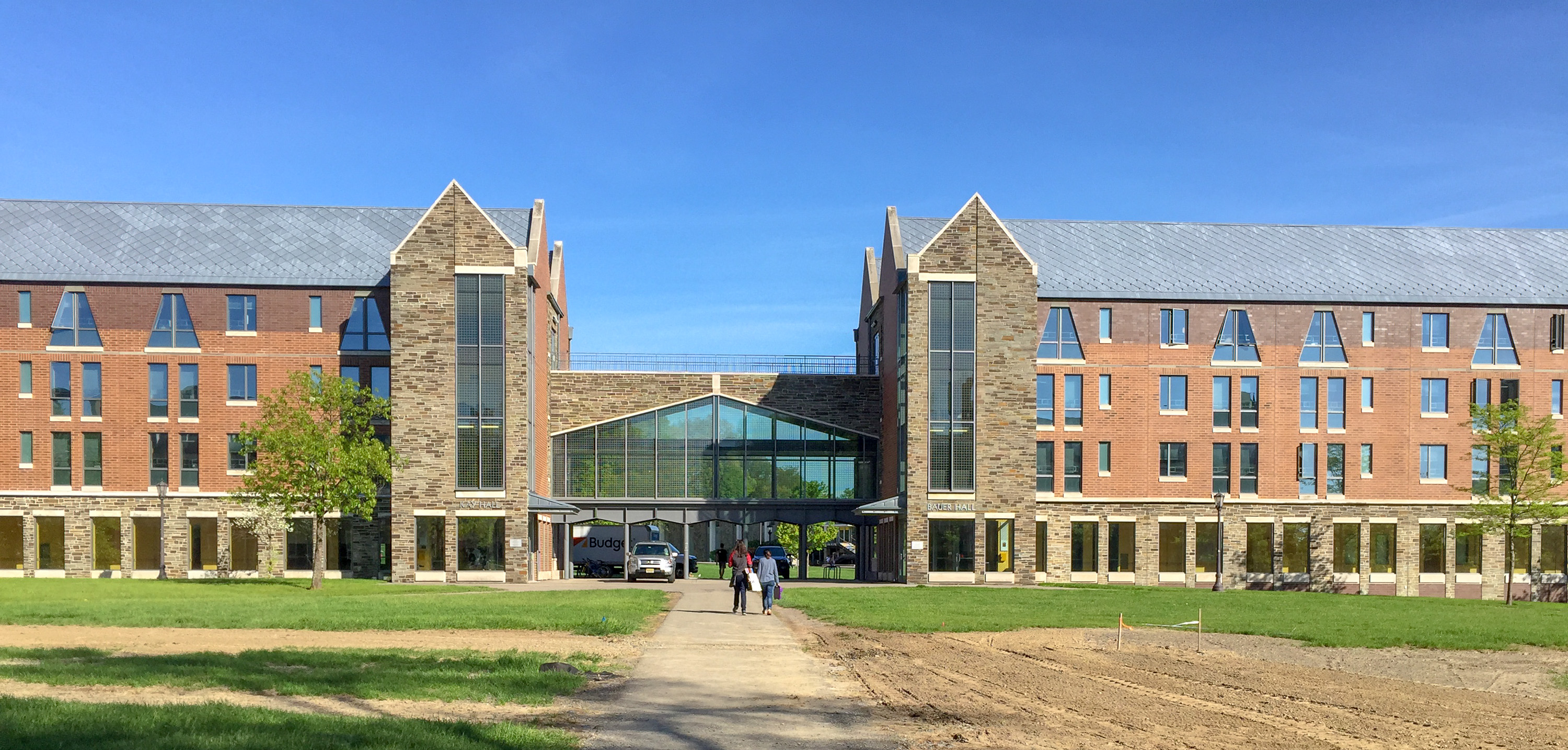
Kay Hall (left) and Bauer Hall (right)

Court–Kay–Bauer Community (CKB) is a group of freshman residence halls on Cornell University's North Campus opened to Cornell students in the fall of 2001. The building was first named Court Hall for the dormitory’s formation of a courtyard enclosed on the opposite side by Clara Dickson Hall. On October 14, 2005, the southern wing of Court Hall was renamed Bauer Hall in response to a gift of $10 million to the University by Robert and Virginia Bauer (Class of 1940 and 1942 respectively). On October 12, 2006, the middle wing of Court Hall was renamed Kay Hall, also in response to a donation of $10 million by Bill Kay (Class of 1951). Court-Kay-Bauer Halls, as well Mews Hall, were built as a part of the North Campus Housing Initiative, and are being renamed in order to fund construction of new upper-classmen residence halls on Cornell’s West Campus. The money generated from the renaming of Court Hall has been put towards the estimated $248 million development of West Campus. Bauer Hall is the section south of the bridge, Kay Hall is the section north of the bridge, and Court Hall is the section perpendicular to Kay Hall.

== Structure ==
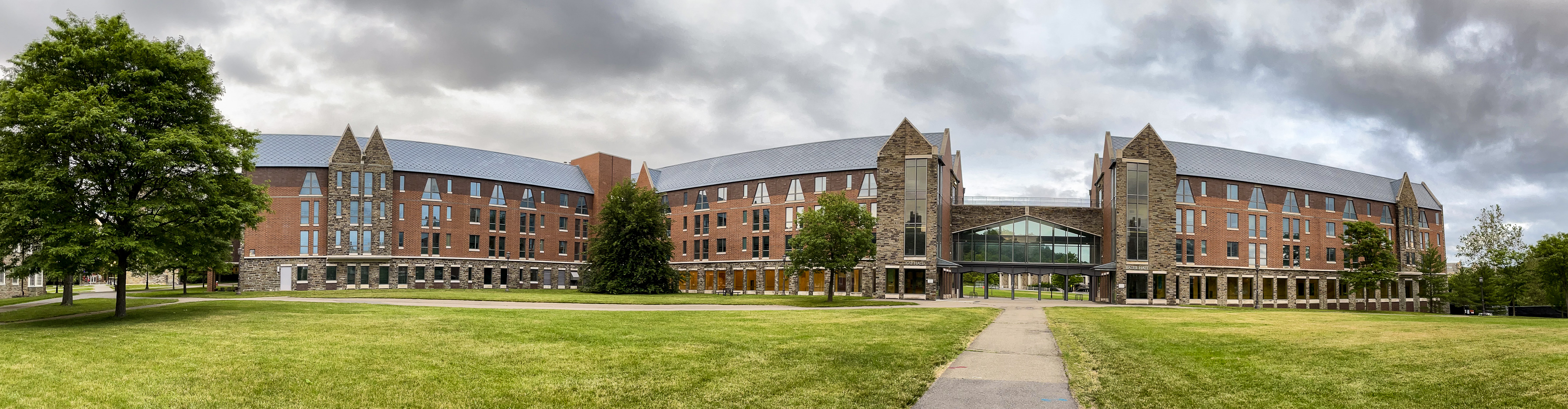
Court at left; Kay at center; Bauer at right

The CKB Community is a four-story building with a modern structure. The first floor of each of the three residences contains community space, in addition to housing one faculty-resident and the Residence Hall Director, while the top three floors are strictly residential. The three halls (Court, Kay and Bauer) are connected by a “sky-bridge” which is enclosed on the second and third floors, and open to the elements on the fourth floor. Each residential floor houses 30 students and one Resident assistant (RA) for a total of 270 first-year students and 9 resident advisors. Court-Kay-Bauer has both single and double occupancy dorm rooms. Sustainability was a major concern of the architects of Court Hall. Their goal was to build a residence that could be environmentally responsible during both construction and post-construction. The result was a modern structure with extremely efficient insulation with a balance of window to wall space to maximize visibility during daytime hours. Court Hall, as well as Mews Hall and Appel Commons, require minimal lighting during the daytime due to the integration of large panel windows into their structure. The building is smoke-free. Single rooms are typically 8'0" x 13'0", while double rooms are typically 11'6" x 16'0".

== Facilities ==
Cornell students often refer to the Court–Kay–Bauer Community as the “Court-Resort” because, in comparison to many of Cornell’s other freshmen residence halls, Court Hall is modern, bright, cheerful, and climate controlled. Floors are coed, while suites are not. Each single-sex open suite contains two double rooms, one single room, and a bathroom with one shower, one toilet, and two sinks. Each floor contains both a study lounge, and a recreation (social) lounge with a television and a kitchen. A typical room contains (per person) an extra-long twin bed, a desk, a desk lamp, a desk chair, a dresser, a bookcase, a waste basket, a closet and high-speed internet access. The Bauer Hall lounge on the first floor contains a Billiard table as well as a ping-pong table, while the Kay Hall lounge contains a piano and a large projection television. A sample room number would be 212A in which the first digit corresponds to the floor number, while the next two digits refer to the section of the building and the final letter representing a room within a suite of three.

== Community ==
The first floor of Court, Kay and Bauer Halls includes a large kitchen, laundry facilities, vending machines, a bike storage room, and lounges designed for studying as well as leisure. The Community Action Board is a group of students, along with two Resident Advisors, that plans activities for the freshmen residents. Past activities include coffee house socials, ice cream socials, and movie nights.

Traditions in the fledgling Court-Bauer Community are the Ice Cream Crawl, participation in Cornell's Relay for Life, the yearly induction of graduating seniors who lived in Court-Bauer during their first year, and weekly Creation Stations. Since its inception in 2001, Court Hall has been known to have an informal, friendly rivalry with Mews Hall.
