= Zoellner Arts Center =

Performing arts venue in Bethlehem, Pennsylvania, United States

Coordinates: 40.60800°N 75.37255°W

Zoellner Arts Center is an arts center located on the campus of Lehigh University in Bethlehem, Pennsylvania, in the United States. It opened in 1997, having been endowed by a $6 million gift from Robert Zoellner ('54) and his wife Victoria.

The center houses the following facilities:

- Baker Hall - a 1,014-seat auditorium with a multi-purpose proscenium stage, suited for concerts, stage productions, ceremonies and lectures.
- Diamond Theater - a small 309-seat 3/4 thrust theater with steeply raked stadium seating suited for theatrical and small music groups.
- Black Box Theater - a smaller 125-seat theater
- A two-story art gallery
- Additional facilities including several rehearsal rooms, recording studio, dance studio, practice rooms, scene shop, costume shop, dressing rooms and green room, classrooms, music library, box office, faculty and staff offices, and three large lobbies and a 345-car parking deck attached to the building.

The venue has had a wide array of performers, including: the New York Philharmonic and Itzhak Perlman, the Tuvan throat singers Huun-Huur-Tu and Laurie Anderson, Hubbard Street Dance Chicago, MOMIX, the Aquila Theatre Company, Lily Tomlin, Bernadette Peters, and Queen Latifah.

The progressive rock music festival NEARFest is also held each summer at the arts center.

The building was designed by Charles Dagit of Dagit Saylor Architects in Philadelphia.
