= Otsego County Courthouse =

- U.S. National Register of Historic Places
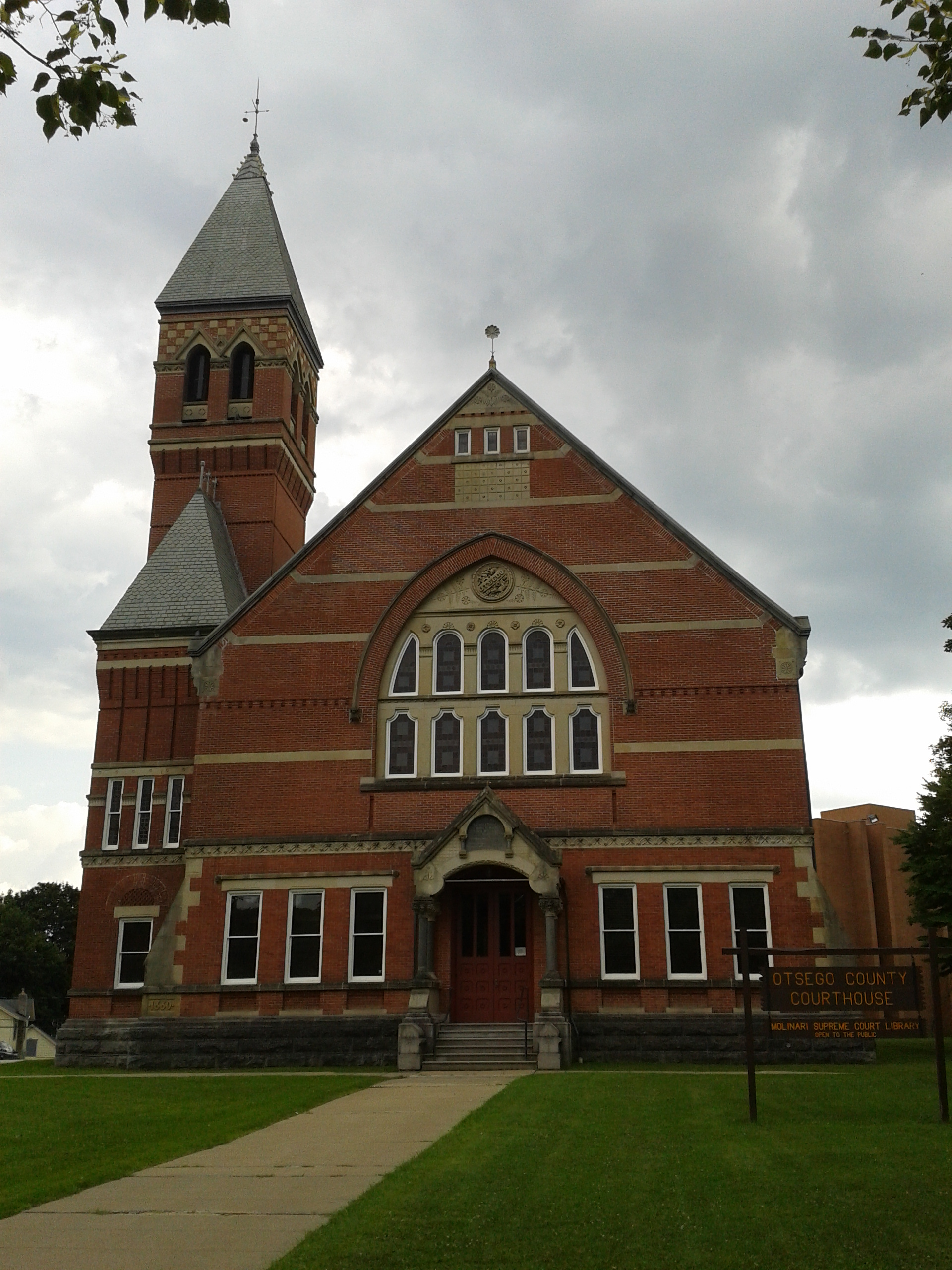
- Front elevation of the Otsego County Courthouse, July, 2014

- Location within New York Location within the United States
- Interactive map showing the location for Otsego County Courthouse
- Location: 193 Main St., Cooperstown, New York
- Coordinates: 42°42′3″N 74°55′48″W
- Area: less than one acre
- Built: 1880
- Architect: Russell, Archimedes
- NRHP reference No.: 72000902
- Added to NRHP: June 20, 1972

Otsego County Courthouse is a historic courthouse building in Cooperstown, Otsego County, New York. It is a 2 1/2-story, brick-and-stone structure on a foundation of coursed ashlar. It was designed by Archimedes Russell (1840–1915) and built in 1880. It features a gable roof, projecting pavilions, and a tower with supporting pavilion and overhanging top stage. The front facade of the building is dominated by a large stained glass window.

It was listed on the National Register of Historic Places in 1972.
