= KieranTimberlake =

American architecture firm

- Industry: Architecture
- Founded: 1984
- Headquarters: Philadelphia, United States
- Area served: International
- Key people: Stephen Kieran (Founder); James Timberlake (Founder) (Note: Samuel Y. Harris (1945–2013), the third co-founder, left the firm in the 1990s.); Richard Maimon (Partner); Jason E. Smith (Partner)
- Services: Architecture, Sustainable Design, Interior Design, Urban Design, Planning
- Website: kierantimberlake.com

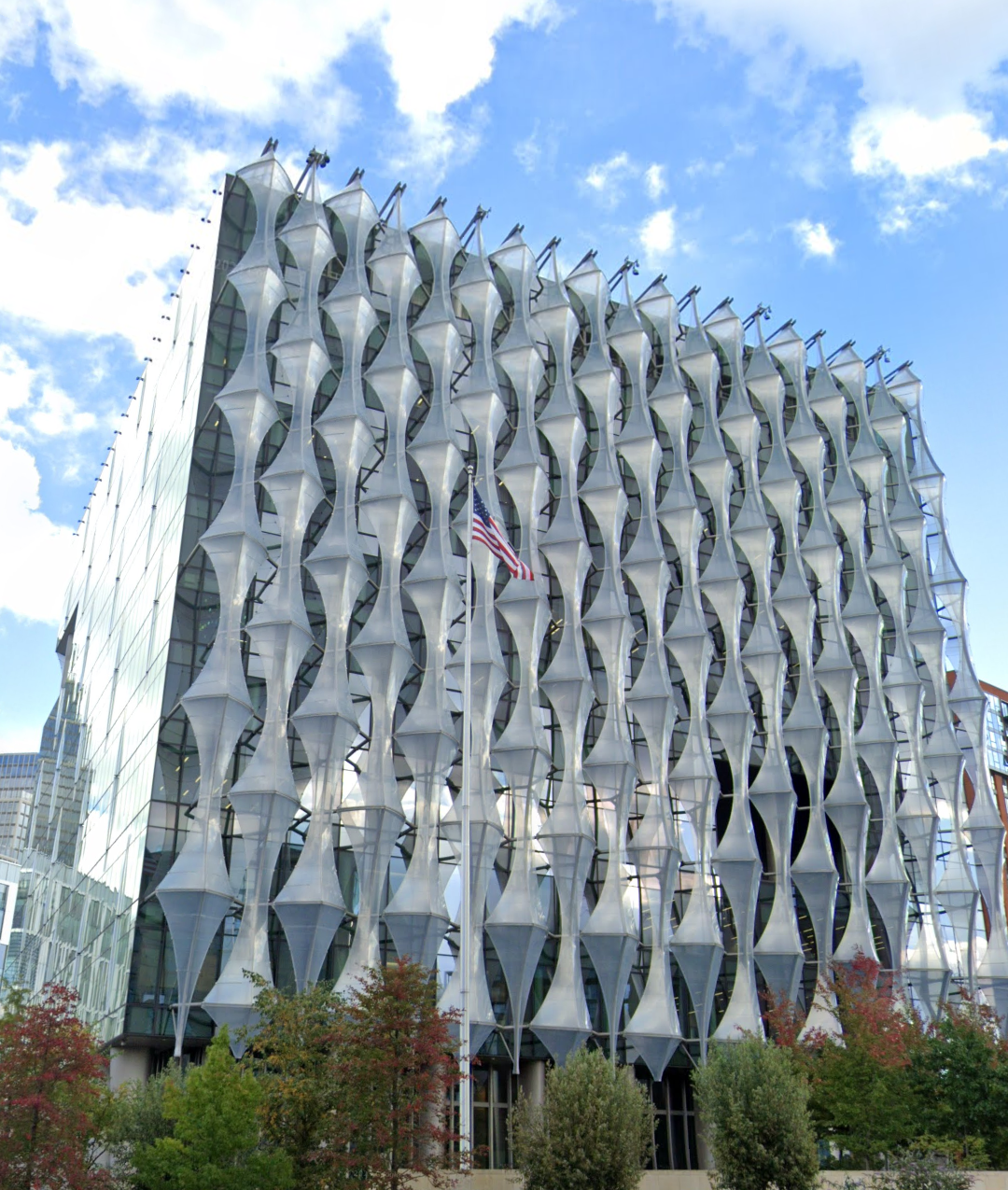
United States Embassy, London

KieranTimberlake is an American architecture firm based in Philadelphia. Since its founding in 1984, it has focused on sustainability, including research that it has used to develop new building technologies and products. Its projects include the planning and design of new structures, and the renovation and transformation of existing buildings. The firm has received many national and international awards for its work.

== History ==
Founders Stephen Kieran and James Timberlake met while they were architecture students at the University of Pennsylvania in the mid-1970s. Their architecture professor Steven Izenour introduced them to architects Robert Venturi and Denise Scott Brown, and the pair went to work at Venturi, Scott Brown & Associates, the firm where Izenour was also employed.

In 1980, Kieran won the Rome Prize, which included a year-long fellowship at the American Academy in Rome. In 1982, Timberlake also won the Rome Prize and was awarded a year-long fellowship.

In 1984, Kieran, Timberlake, and structural engineer Sam Harris, established KieranTimberlake. The firm was initially headquartered in Kieran's Powelton Village house. Their first projects included a new building for Kieran's father's car dealership and a jewelry store. The firm's first big project came in 1986 when they were commissioned to design a campus community center at Chestnut Hill College. KieranTimberlake was then commissioned for a project at Bryn Mawr College's Shipley School complex. Harris later left KieranTimberlake in the 1990s to run his own practice.

In 2001, James Timberlake and Stephen Kieran won the Benjamin Henry Latrobe award from the Fellow of the American Institute of Architects which came with $50,000. Timberlake and Kieran used the earnings to write a book titled Refabricating Architecture. The book was published in 2003, and as of 2011, had sold 13,000 copies. In 2002, Princeton Architectural Press published Manual: The Architecture of KieranTimberlake, which presents a technical look at the firm's architectural practices. By 2002, the firm had 50 employees.

In 2003, the firm installed the first actively ventilated curtain wall in North America at the University of Pennsylvania's Levine Hall. Also in 2003, KieranTimberlake built a pavilion featuring the firm's Smartwrap technology at the Cooper Hewitt, Smithsonian Design Museum.

In 2008, KieranTimberlake's Cellophane House was selected to appear at the Museum of Modern Art's Home Delivery: Fabricating the Modern Dwelling exhibition. The building was selected for the MoMA's exhibit due to its modular design, use of sustainable building practices, and SmartWrap.

In February 2010, KieranTimberlake won the commission for the new Embassy of the United States, London. In January 2018, the new embassy building in London opened.

In 2015, Kieran and Timberlake authored Alluvium: Dhaka, Bangladesh, in the Crossroads of Water, a book investigating housing and climate change in Bangladesh. The book was inspired by the graduate architecture research studio the pair taught at the University of Pennsylvania, which included a trip to Bangladesh.

By January 2016, KieranTimberlake had moved its headquarters to a 63,000-square-foot former bottling plant for Henry F. Ortlieb’s Brewing Co., now Christian Schmidt Brewing Company, in the Northern Liberties neighborhood of Philadelphia and has 100 employees.

== Research and development ==
The firm has conducted research studies on carbon reduction and sustainability which have led to the development of new building technologies and products. One such product is customizable plastic walls called SmartWrap that cover conventional walls and provide insulation, heat, power, and light. SmartWrap is a proprietary system consisting of layers of transparent PET plastic that incorporates ultrathin photovoltaic cells that gather solar energy, coupled with flat chemical batteries to store it. It was developed (in coordination with ILC Dover and DuPont) while teaching at the University of Pennsylvania School of Design, and debuted at a "SmartWrap" pavilion erected at the Cooper-Hewitt in 2003.

In 2013, KieranTimberlake developed Pointelist, a wireless sensor network.

Later in 2013, KieranTimberlake developed Tally, a life cycle assessment software plug-in for the building information modeling software Autodesk Revit. KieranTimberlake gifted Tally to the nonprofit organization Building Transparency in 2021, making Tally free and open access.

In 2018, the firm published the app Roast, which surveys users to assess building comfort by recording perceived temperatures, brightness, and noise levels. Development of the app began when the firm moved into a former beer bottling plant in the summer of 2015.

== Selected projects ==
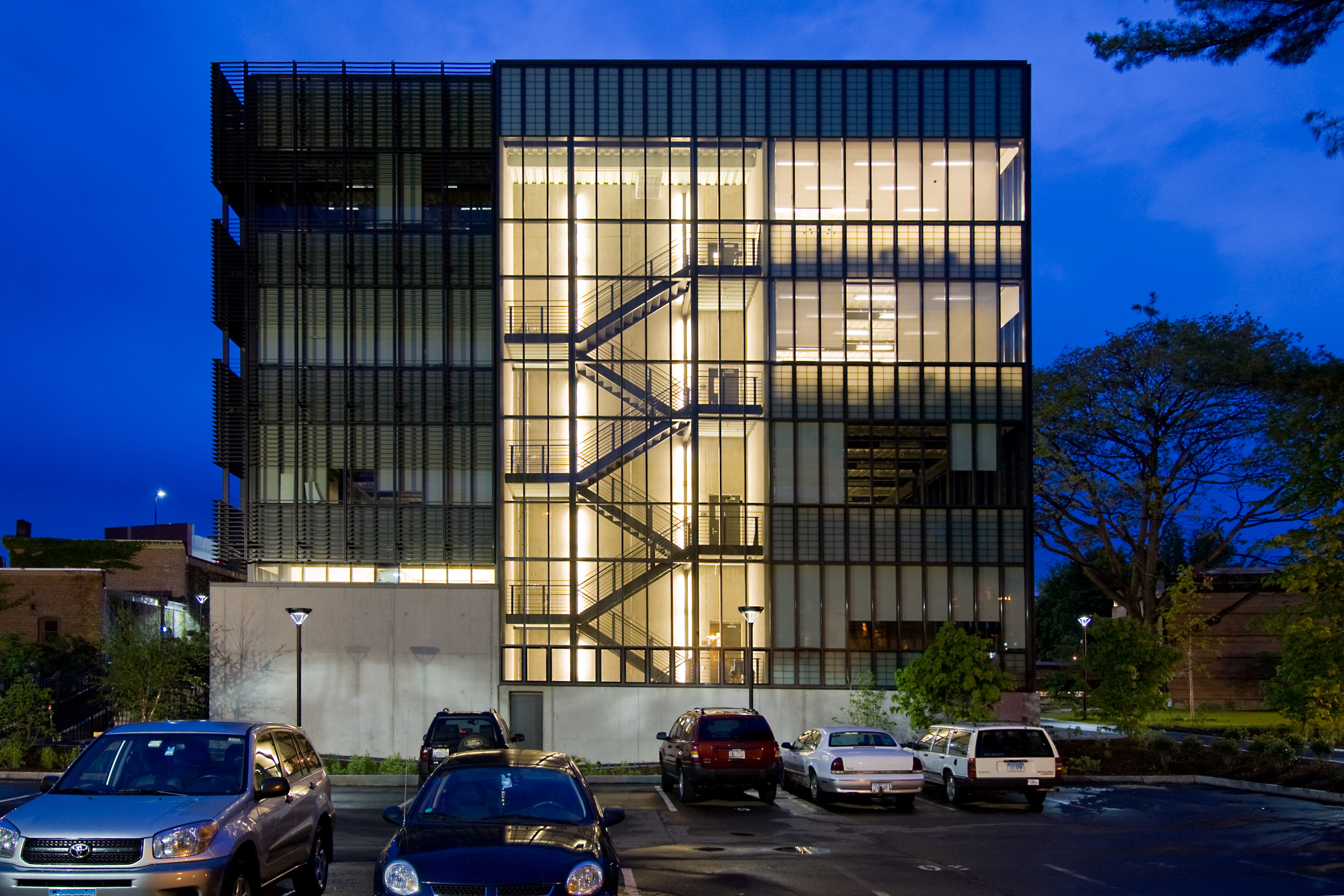
Sculpture Building and School of Art Gallery, Yale University

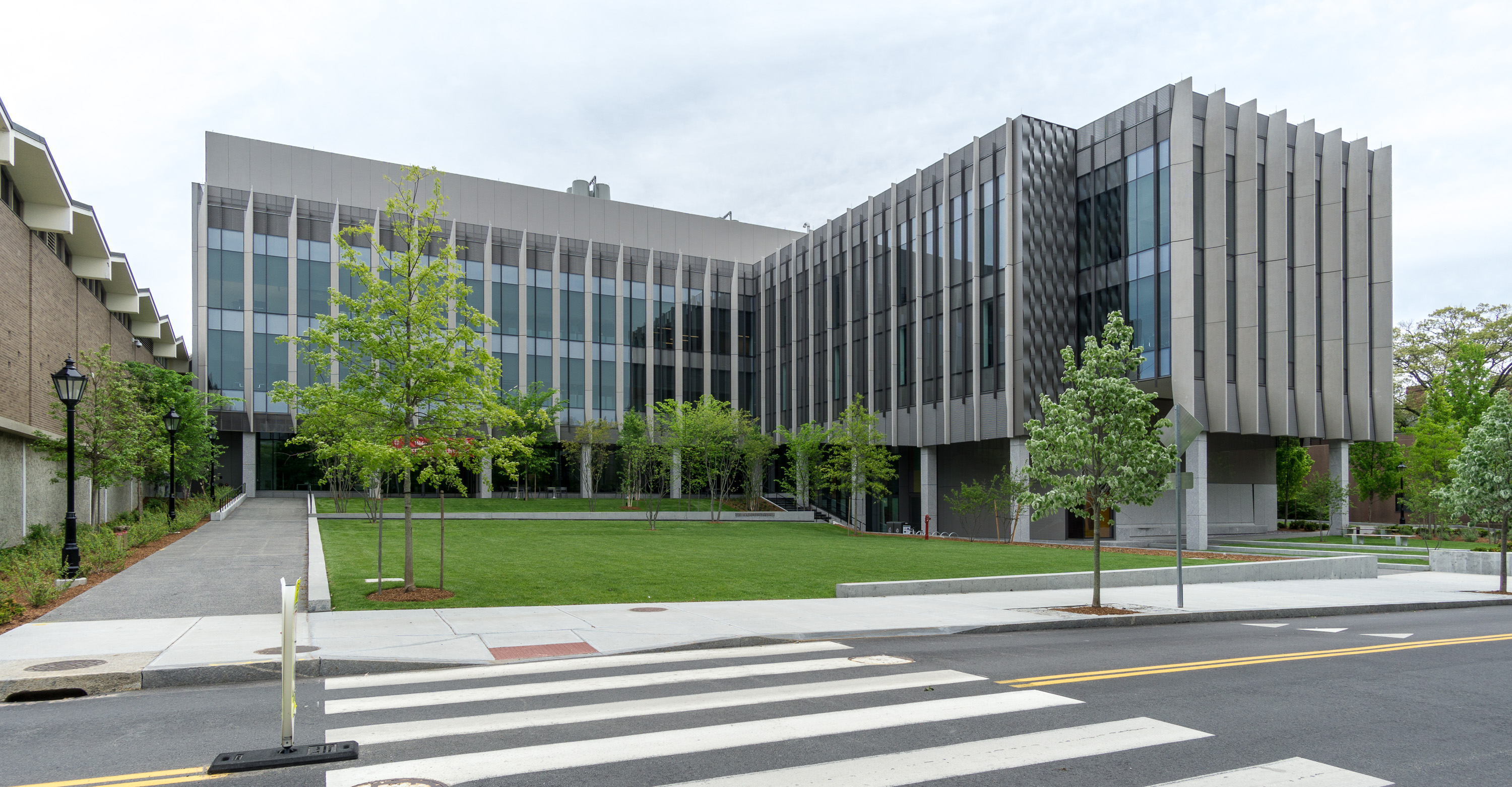
Brown University Engineering Research Center (2017)

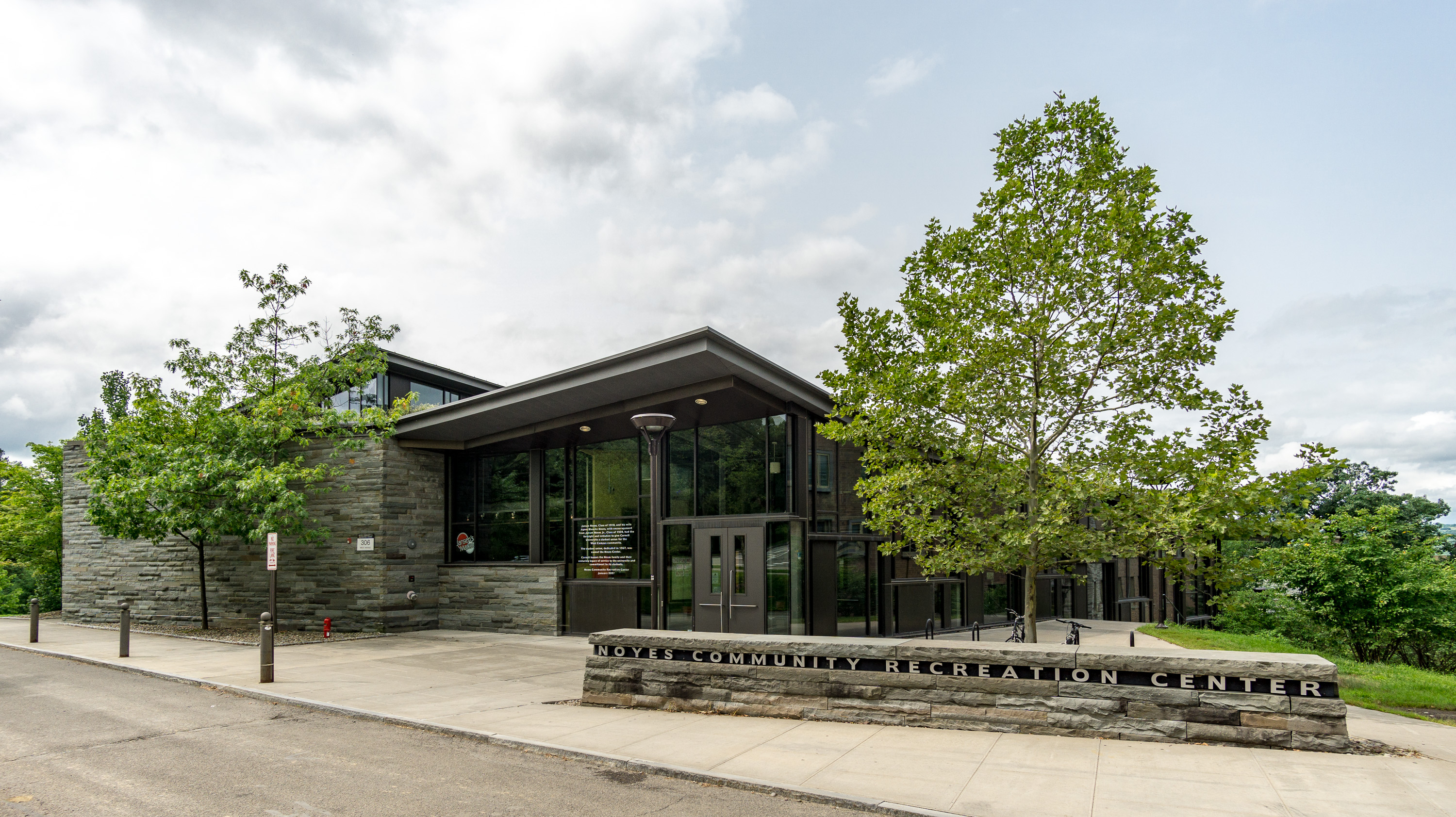
Noyes Community Recreation Center, Cornell University (2006)

Project	Location	Status	Year
West Middle School, The Shipley School	(United States) Bryn Mawr, PA	Completed	1993
Loblolly House	(United States) Taylors Island, MD	Completed	2006
Sidwell Friends School Middle School Renovation	(United States) Washington, D.C.	Completed	2006
Yale University Sculpture Building and Gallery	(United States) New Haven, CT	Completed	2007
Cellophane House, Museum of Modern Art	(United States) Midtown Manhattan, New York City	Completed	2008
Yale University Morse College and Ezra Stiles College Renovation	(United States) Wellesley, Massachusetts	Completed	2010
Rice University Brockman Hall for Physics	(United States) Houston, Texas	Completed	2011
University of California, San Diego Charles David Keeling Apartments	(United States) San Diego, California	Completed	2011
Dilworth Park	(United States) Philadelphia, PA	Completed	2014
Pound Ridge House	(United States) Pound Ridge, New York	Completed	2014
High Horse Ranch	(United States) Willits, California	Completed	2016
Embassy of the United States, London	(United Kingdom) London	Completed	2017
Washington University in St. Louis Danforth Campus East End Transformation	(United States) St. Louis, Missouri	Completed	2019
University of California, Santa Barbara Henley Hall Institute for Energy Efficiency	(United States) Santa Barbara, CA	Completed	2020
Iowa State University Student Innovation Center	(United States) Ames, Iowa	Completed	2020
University of Washington North Campus Housing	(United States) Seattle, Washington	Completed	2021
Art and Ideals: President John F. Kennedy at the John F. Kennedy Center for the Performing Arts	(United States) Washington, D.C.	Completed	2022
New York University John A. Paulson Center	(United States) New York City	Completed	2023
Folger Shakespeare Library Renovation	(United States) Washington, D.C.	Completed	2024
Penn's Landing Park Pavilion	(United States) Philadelphia, PA	Under Construction	2024
University of Toronto Mississauga Science Building	(Canada) Mississauga, ON	Completed	2024

== Selected awards ==
- 2001 American Institute of Architects College of Fellows Latrobe Prize
- 2008 American Institute of Architects Architecture Firm Award
- 2009 American Institute of Architects Education Facility Award for Yale University Sculpture Building and Gallery
- 2010 Cooper-Hewitt National Design Award
- 2014 American Institute of Architects Institute Honor Award for Sidwell Friends School Quaker Meeting House and Arts Centre
- 2019 American Institute of Architects Housing Award for University of California Santa Barbara San Joaquin Villages
- 2021 Center for Architecture and Design's 35th Louis I. Kahn Award
- 2022 American Institute of Architects Architecture Award for U.S. Embassy in London
- 2023 American Institute of Architects Regional and Urban Design Award for Washington University in St. Louis East End Transformation
- 2024 American Institute of Architects Housing Award for University of Washington North Campus Housing
- 2024 American Institute of Architects Architecture Award for New York University John A. Paulson Center

== Publications ==
- Kieran, Stephen; Timberlake, James (2002). Manual: The Architecture of KierenTimberlake. Princeton Architectural Press. p. 216. ISBN 978-1568983509.
- Kieran, Stephen; Timberlake, James (2003). Refabricating Architecture. New York: McGraw Hill. p. 175. ISBN 978-0071709088.
- Kieran, Stephen; Timberlake, James (2008). Loblolly House: Elements of a New Architecture. Princeton Architectural Press. p. 176. ISBN 978-1568987477.
- Kieran, Stephen; Timberlake, James (2011). Cellophane House. KieranTimberlake. p. 145. ISBN 978-0983130130.
- Kieran, Stephen; Timberlake, James; Wallick, Karl (2011). KieranTimberlake: Inquiry. Rizzoli International Publications. p. 256. ISBN 978-0847836789.
- Kieran, Stephen; Timberlake, James (2015). Alluvium: Dhaka, Bangladesh, in the Crossroads of Water. ORO Editions. p. 351. ISBN 978-1941806869.
- Kieran, Stephen; Timberlake, James (2019). Fullness. Phaidon Press. p. 608. ISBN 978-1580935548.
