= Clara Dickson Hall =

Residence hall at Cornell University

Coordinates: 42°27′17.16″N 76°28′45.87″W

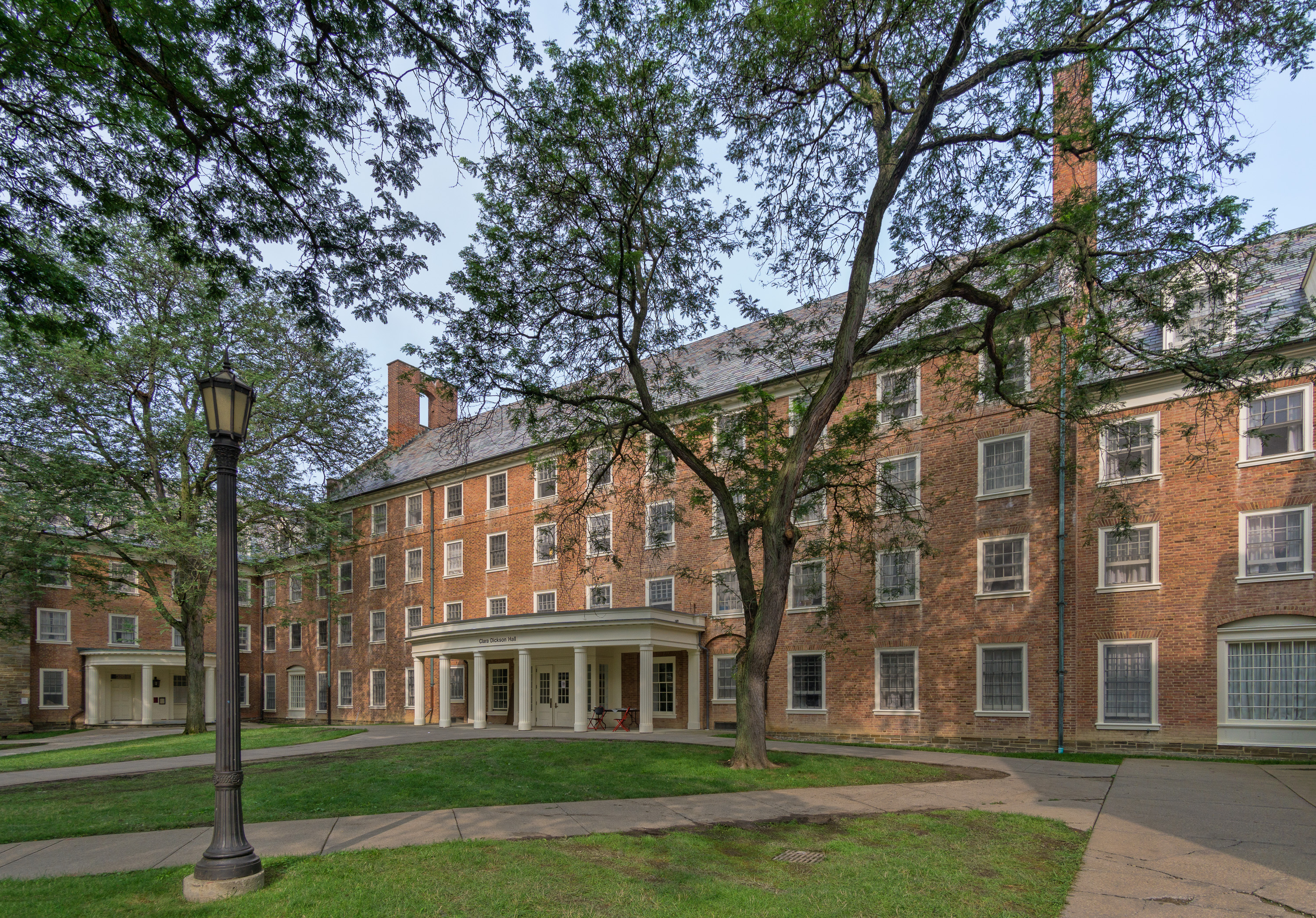
Clara Dickson Hall

Clara Dickson Hall is a residence hall located on the North Campus of Cornell University. For many years it was the largest dormitory on North Campus, housing over 460 students, until construction of Ginsburg Hall (504 beds) and Ganędagǫ Hall (577 beds) in 2022. Clara Dickson is also home to the Multicultural Living Learning Unit, or "McLLU".

== History ==
Clara Dickson Hall was constructed in 1946 in the Colonial style. The hall was named after Clara Dickson, the mother of Cornell's first president Andrew Dickson White. Dickson Hall was originally built as a women-only dorm, as were the other North Campus residences at the time.

Future Supreme Court Justice Ruth Bader Ginsburg '54 lived in Dickson during her freshman year at Cornell.

== Facilities ==
Dickson Hall has an idiosyncratic numbering system for rooms. Room numbers start with the floor the room is on, followed by a number indicating which side of the building they are on; rooms in the southwest are said to be on the "5" side and rooms in the northeast half are said to be on the "6" side. Furthermore, the basement (which is the building's ground floor at the back side due to its being on a hill) is labeled as the first floor. So, for example, a room on the first floor, on the far left side of the building (when looking at it from the front) would be said to be in "2-5". All room numbers are 4 digits, with the last two increasing as one moves toward the center of Dickson. For example, 2692 is the closest room to the middle on the 6 side. The far end of 2-6 has housed McLLU since 1999, and the last hall at the far end of 2-5 is commonly referred to as D-20 (though there is no real structural or administrative difference between it and the rest of the building).

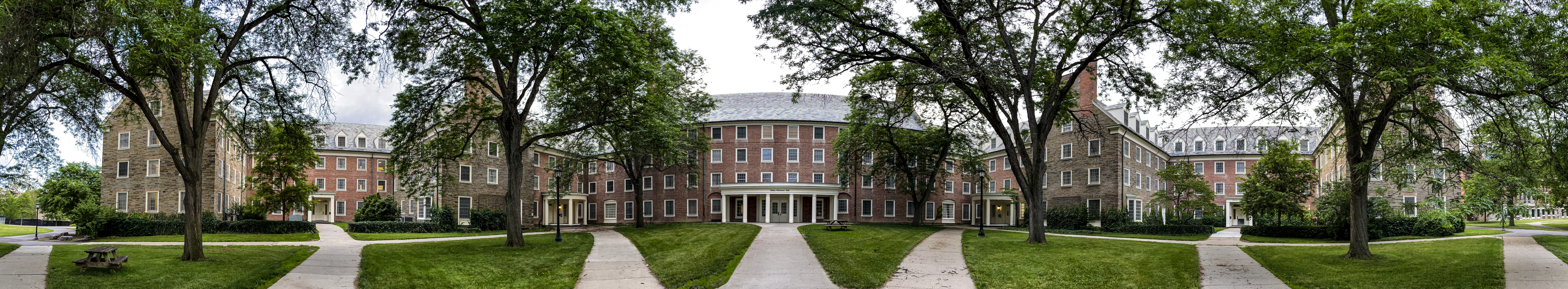
Panorama from courtyard

The majority of rooms in Dickson Hall are singles. This is with the exception of the 32 odd corner rooms, which are triple; there are very few doubles. Each side of each floor has at least one large bathroom for each sex on each side of the building, which has several stalls and showers. Each floor also has its own lounge at the center of the floor, dividing the 5 and 6 sides. The exception to this is the 1st floor (floor 2), which has the building's main lobby at its center, and as such, has two lounges: one about halfway down the 5 side and one about halfway down the 6 side. All lounges have TVs without cable, and the quality, size, and reliability of the TVs varies greatly with floor. Dickson houses both freshmen and upperlevel students, and became a popular choice for rising sophomores in the 2024-25 academic year who had later timeslots, but still wanted a single.
