= Charles E. Dagit Jr. =

American architect and artist

- Born: 1943; Philadelphia, Pennsylvania, U.S.
- Died: March 27, 2024 (aged 80–81); Bryn Mawr, Pennsylvania, U.S.
- Education: University of Pennsylvania
- Occupation: Architect
- Parent(s): Janet Donnelly Dagit; Charles Dagit
- Awards: Pennsylvania Gold Medal of Distinction
- Buildings: Shippensburg University Grove Hall; Cornell University Appel Commons; Dagit Residence; Lehigh University Zoellner Arts Center
- Projects: Cornell North Campus Residential Initiative

Charles E. Dagit Jr. was a contemporary American architect, artist, writer and professor. He was a Fellow of the American Institute of Architects residing in suburban Philadelphia, Pennsylvania, USA.

Charles Dagit taught architectural design for 40 years at Temple University, and Drexel University, and was a visiting critic and lecturer at the University of Pennsylvania, Cornell University, Carnegie Mellon University, and Syracuse University.

In 2012 the American Institute of Architects (AIA) Pennsylvania presented Charles Dagit with its highest honor, the Gold Medal of Distinction for his career achievements in architecture. Only three other Philadelphia Design Architects have ever received this award; Robert Venturi, Peter Bohlin, and Vincent Kling. The AIA's Philadelphia chapter also honored Dagit in 2012 with the prestigious Thomas U. Walter Award for a lifetime of achievement in design excellence, dedication as a teaching professor, and for his committed service to the AIA over four decades. In 2013 his first book was published, Louis I. Kahn Architect - Remembering the Man and Those Who Surrounded Him.

== Early life and education ==
Dagit was born in Philadelphia, Pennsylvania and was raised in a family of architects. His grandfather, Henry D. Dagit, had founded a prominent architectural firm in 1888, Henry D. Dagit & Sons, known best for Catholic Churches in the eastern United States, and his father and uncles were architects at the firm. Dagit studied in the Louis I. Kahn Masters Studio in architecture, earning a master's degree in Architecture in 1968, at the University of Pennsylvania. In Philadelphia in the 1960s, Louis I. Kahn's Masters Studio was the hub for what became known as "The Philadelphia School". The philosophies and design of Louis Kahn, Robert Venturi, Aldo Giurgola, and others were influential in his designs.

== Architecture ==
In 1970 he founded Dagit•Saylor Architects and won over 60 Design Awards including the Gold and silver medals for design from AIA Pennsylvania and AIA Philadelphia. In 1976 Robert A.M. Stern named him one of the “40 Under 40 American Architects” in A+U Magazine. 1983 he was elevated to the College of Fellows of the American Institute of Architects, the youngest architect to that time to be honored as an AIA Fellow. Dagit's work has been published in international design magazines including; Architectural Record, L’Architecture d’Aujourd’Hui, The Japan Architect, L’Industria delle Construzioni, and many others.

Charles Dagit has provided leadership in the AIA National Committee on Design (COD) for over 3 decades, chairing the National Awards Task Group and the Gold Medal Task Group. He served as Chairman of the Committee in 1994. He chaired the AIA COD National Design Conference in 1991, with a focus on “The Philadelphia School”. Dagit has also served on the Boards of both the AIA Pennsylvania and Philadelphia, and was President of AIA Philadelphia in 1991.

== Select projects ==
=== College buildings ===
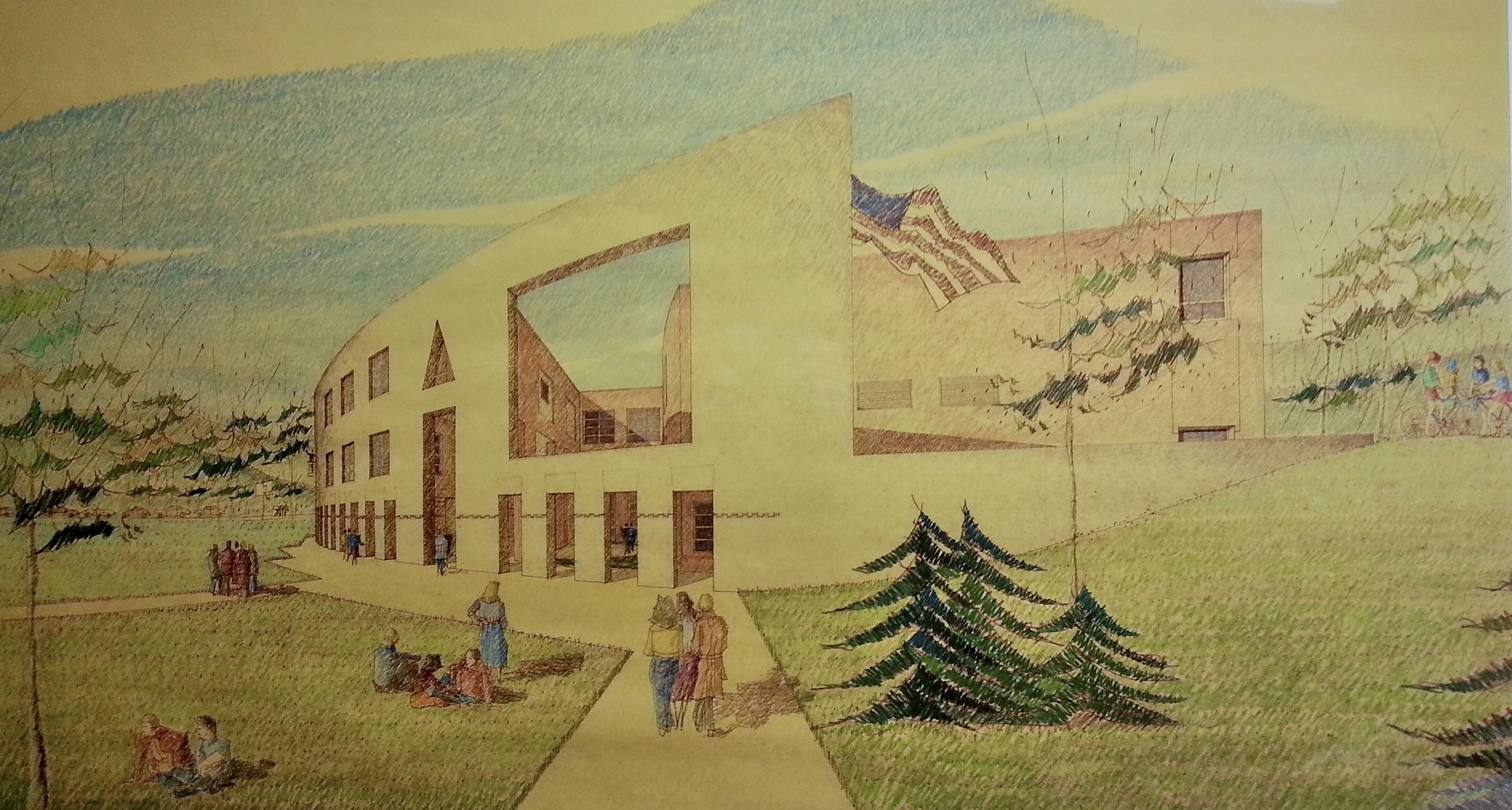
Drawing of Shippensburg University Cumberland Union building by Charles E. Dagit Jr.

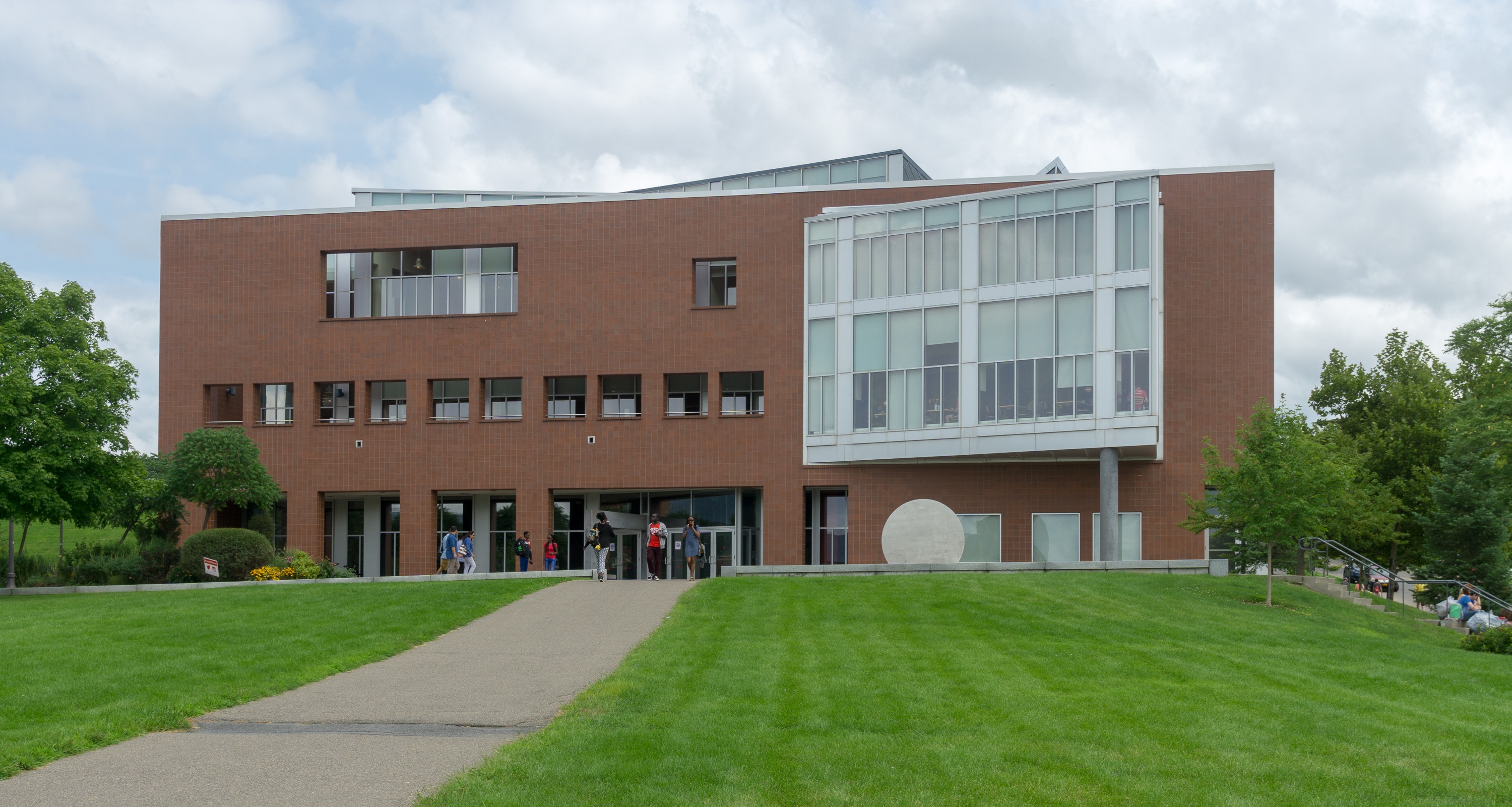
Appel Commons, Cornell University (2000)

- Beloit College, Logan Museum of Anthropology, 1993–95
- Cornell University
  - Appel Commons Building (2000)
  - North Campus Residential Initiative Plan
- Haverford College, Whitehead Campus Center, 1990
- Lehigh University, Zoellner Performing Arts Center, 1997
- Pennsylvania State University
  - Physical Education Building
  - Agricultural Arena
- Shippensburg University
  - Grove Hall, College of Business
  - Cumberland Union Building
- Swarthmore College, Lang Performing Arts Center, 1991
- Ursinus College
  - F.W. Olin Hall
  - Berman Museum of Art, 1989

=== Other buildings ===
- Samuel M.V. Hamilton Building, Pennsylvania Academy of the Fine Arts, 2005
- Monastery of St. Clare
- Pennsylvania Ballet

== Awards and honors ==
- The Medal of Distinction, Gold Medal, AIA Pennsylvania 2012
- The Thomas U. Walter Award, AIA Philadelphia 2012
- Silver Medal of the Pennsylvania Society of Architects, 1985
- National Design Competition Winner, Cultural Arts Pavilion in Newport News, Virginia, 1984
- College of Fellows, Design, AIA, 1983
- World Contemporary Architecture Survey, The Japan Architect, 1976
- "40 Under 40" American Architects, A+U Magazine, 1976
- Gold Medal of the Philadelphia Chapter, AIA, 1976
- Silver Medal of the Philadelphia Chapter, AIA, 1975
- Shenck-Woodman Traveling Fellowship, 1968
- John Stewardson Memorial Traveling Fellowship, 1967
- James Smyth Warner Prize, 1967
- Dales Traveling Fellowship, 1966

== Books ==
- The Groundbreakers: Architects in American History - Their Places and Times, Dagit, 2015 ISBN 978-1-4128-5614-0
- Louis I. Kahn Architect: Remembering the Man and Those who Surrounded Him, Dagit, 2013 ISBN 978-1-4128-5179-4
