= Archimedes Russell =

American architect (1840–1915)

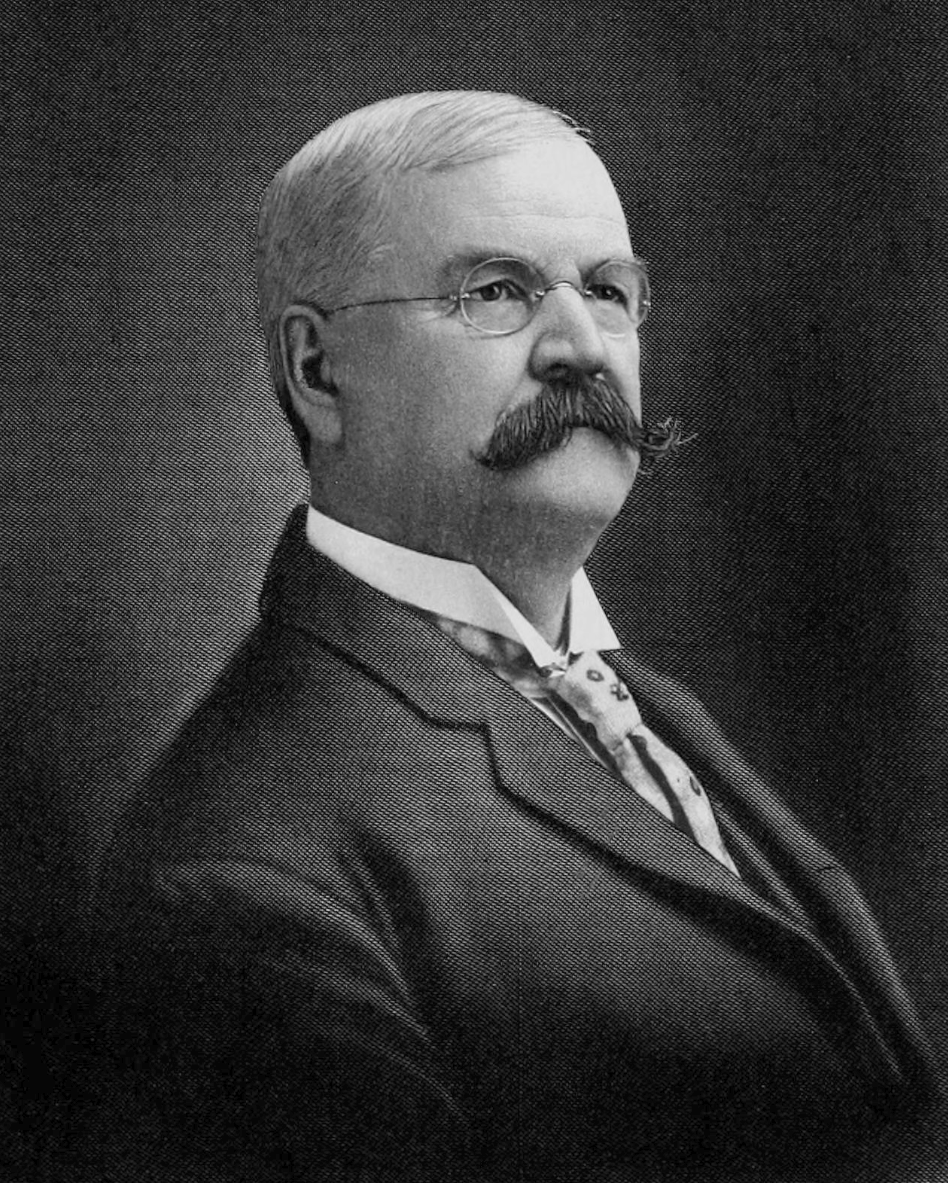
- Born: June 13, 1840; Andover, Massachusetts
- Died: April 3, 1915 (aged 74); Syracuse, New York
- Resting place: Mount Auburn Cemetery
- Occupation: Architect
- Buildings: Crouse College, Syracuse University

Signature
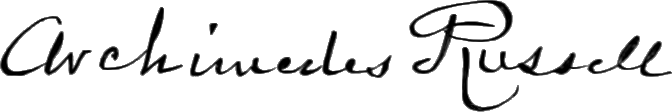

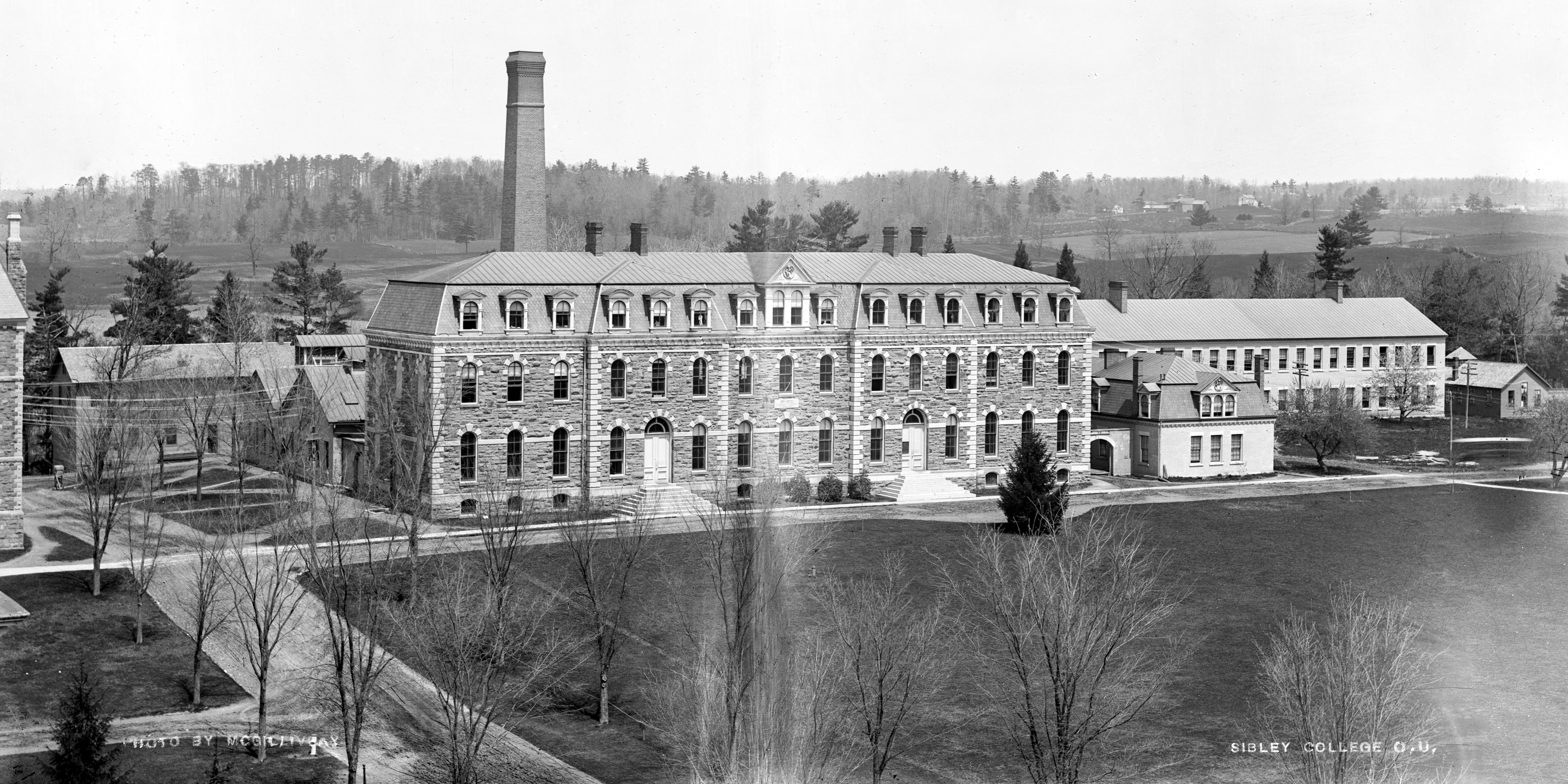
West Sibley Hall, Cornell University (1870)

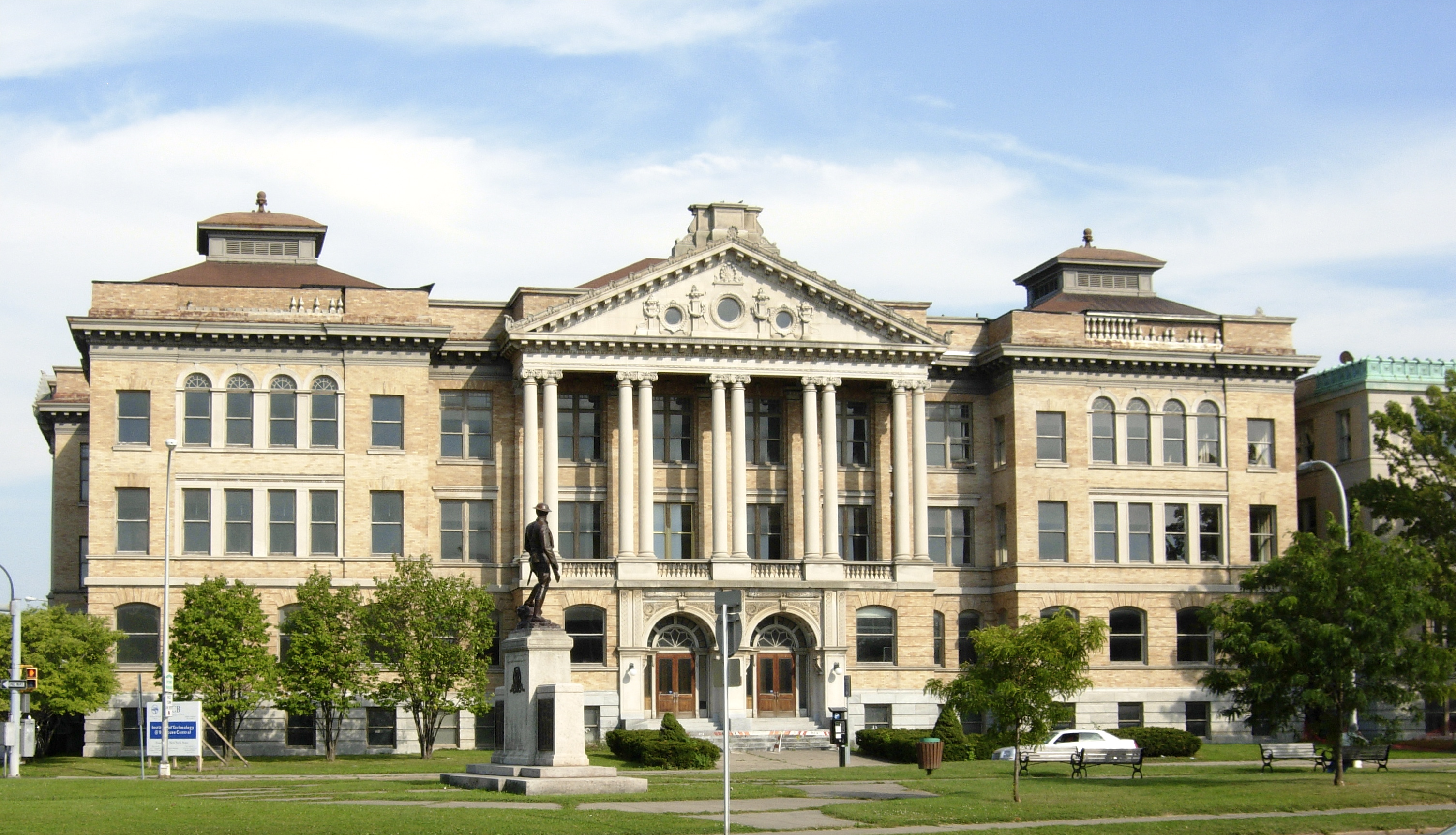
Central Technical High School in Syracuse (1900)

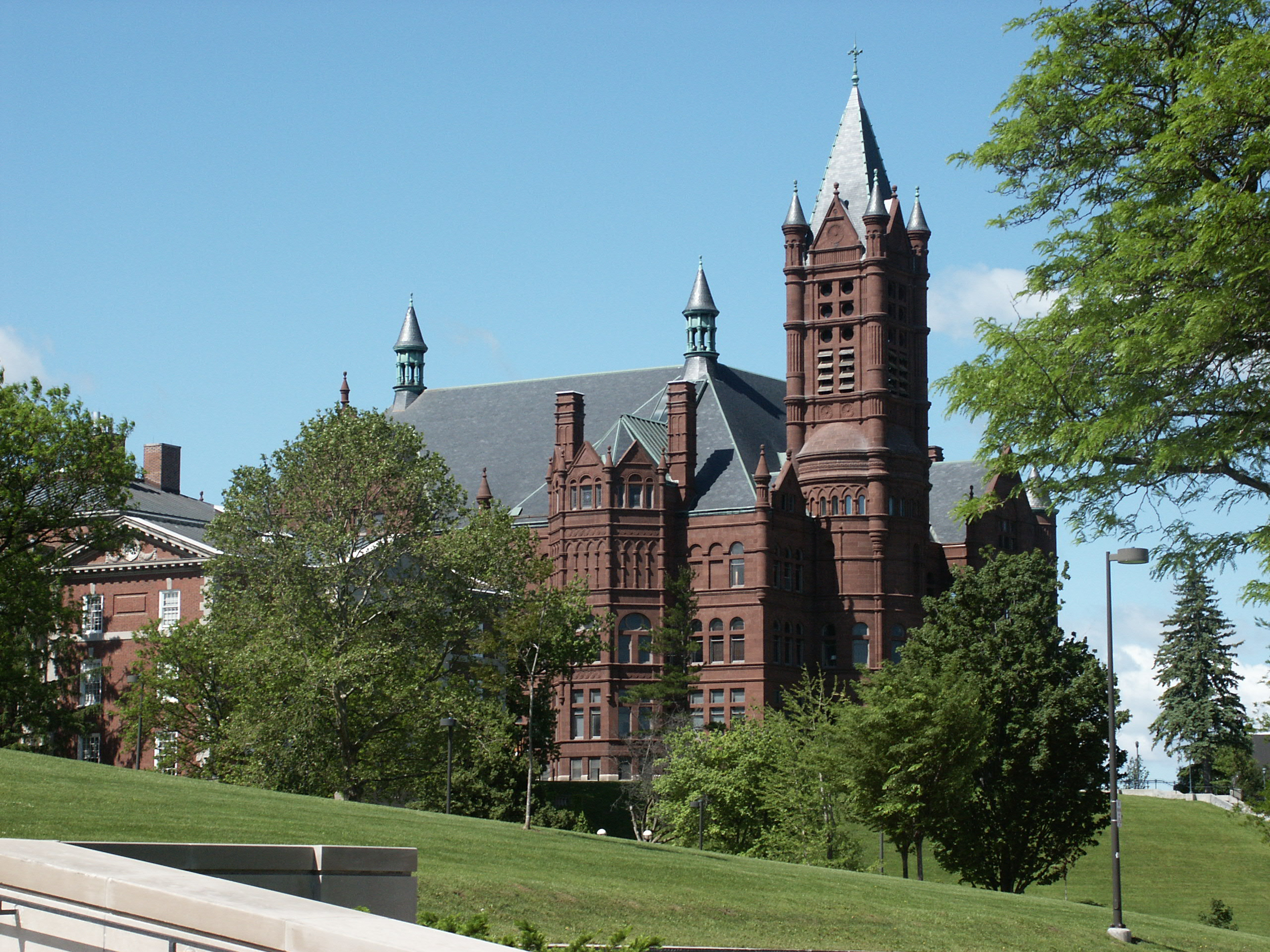
Crouse College, Syracuse University (1881)

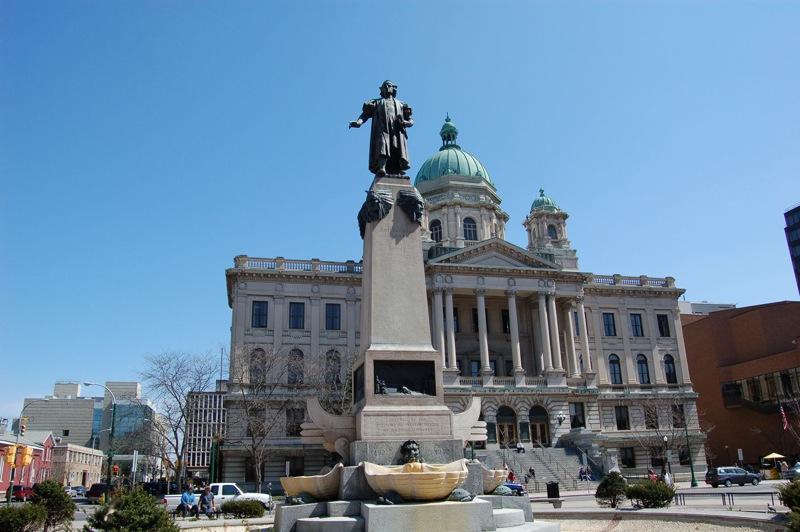
Onondaga County Courthouse, with Columbus Obelisk in foreground (1904-1907)

Archimedes Russell (June 13,1840 – April 3, 1915) was an American architect most active in the Syracuse, New York area.

== Biography ==
Born in Andover, Massachusetts and trained under local architect Horatio Nelson White, Russell served as a professor of architecture at Syracuse University from 1873 through 1881.

In the course of his career he designed over 850 commercial and civic buildings in the central New York region, including the David H. Burrell Mansion in Little Falls, New York, a Queen Anne/Romanesque Revival stone mansion.

His practice still continues today as King + King Architects, and is New York state’s oldest and the third oldest architectural firm in the United States.

He died in Syracuse on April 3, 1915, and was buried at Mount Auburn Cemetery in Cambridge, Massachusetts.

== Work ==
Russell's work, much of which has been listed on the National Register of Historic Places, includes:

- Mrs. I. L. Crego House, 1870
- West Sibley Hall, 1870, and McGraw Hall, 1872 at Cornell University
- St Lucy Church, Syracuse, 1873
- First Baptist Church of Camillus, 1879
- Otsego County (New York) Courthouse, 1880
- Crouse College, Syracuse University, 1881
- Third National Bank, aka the Community Chest Building, Syracuse, 1885
- Overlook, Little Falls, New York, 1889
- Whedon–Schumacher House, Syracuse, 1892; National Register of Historic Places
- West Hill School, 1891–93
- Dey Brothers Building, Syracuse, 1893, a contributing building in the South Salina Street Downtown Historic District
- Bastable Theatre, Syracuse, 1893
- Central Technical High School, Syracuse, 1900
- Onondaga County Courthouse, Columbus Circle, Syracuse, 1904-1907 (with murals by William de Leftwich Dodge)
- C. W. Snow and Company Warehouse, 1913
- St. Matthew's Church, East Syracuse, 1915
- St. Anthony of Padua Church, Syracuse
