= Morrill Hall (Cornell University) =

Building in Ithaca, New York

- Morrill Hall, Cornell University
- U.S. National Register of Historic Places
- U.S. National Historic Landmark
- New York State Register of Historic Places
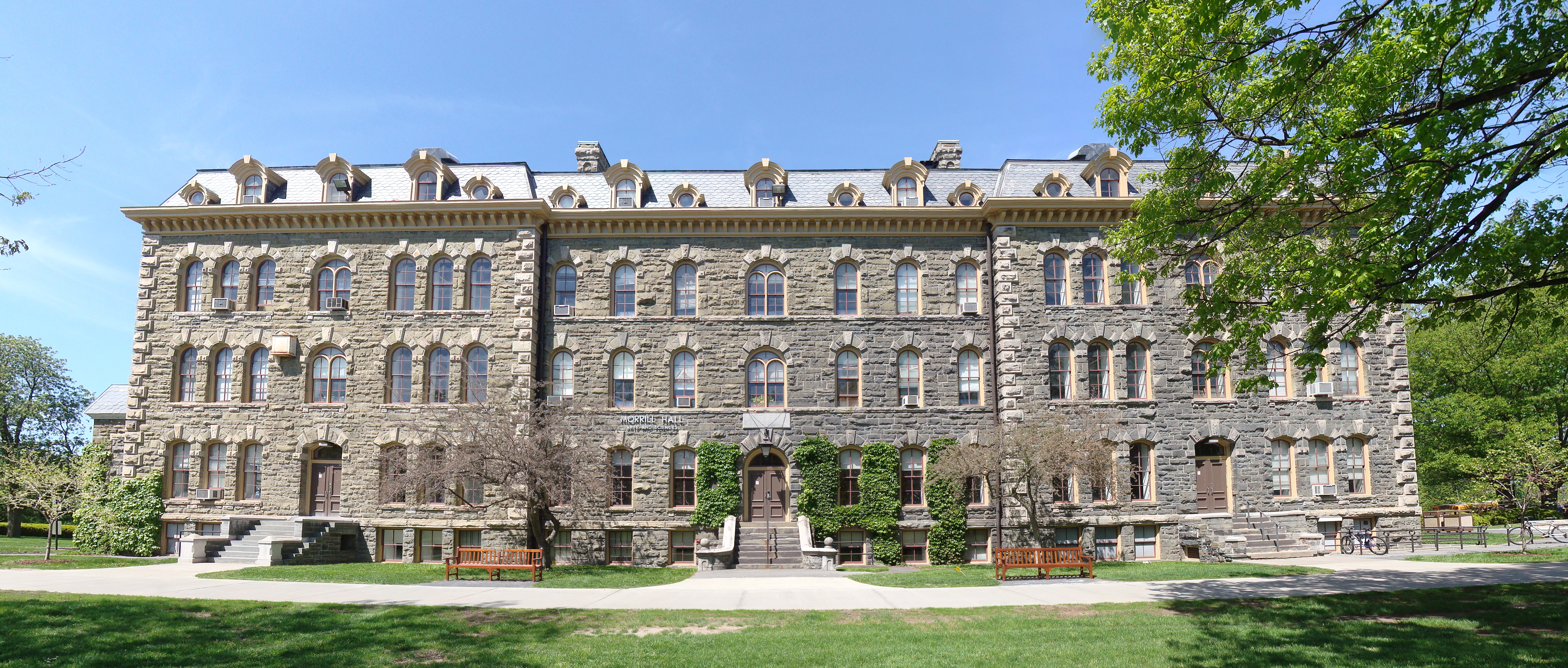
- Morrill Hall at Cornell University in May 2009

- Location within New York Location within the United States
- Location: 159 Central Ave., Ithaca, New York, U.S.
- Coordinates: 42°26′55″N 76°29′7″W
- Built: 1866
- Architect: Harlow Wilcox and Cyrus K Porter
- Architectural style: Second Empire
- NRHP reference No.: 66000576
- NYSRHP No.: 10940.000008

Significant dates
- Added to NRHP: October 15, 1966
- Designated NHL: December 21, 1965
- Designated NYSRHP: June 23, 1980

Justin Morrill Hall, known almost exclusively as Morrill Hall, is an academic building of Cornell University on its main campus in Ithaca, New York. As of 2009, it houses the university's Departments of Romance Studies, Russian Literature, and Linguistics. The building is named in honor of Justin Smith Morrill, who as Senator from Vermont was the primary proponent of the Morrill Land-Grant Colleges Act of 1862 which greatly assisted the founding of Cornell University. Morrill Hall was declared a National Historic Landmark in 1965.

== History ==
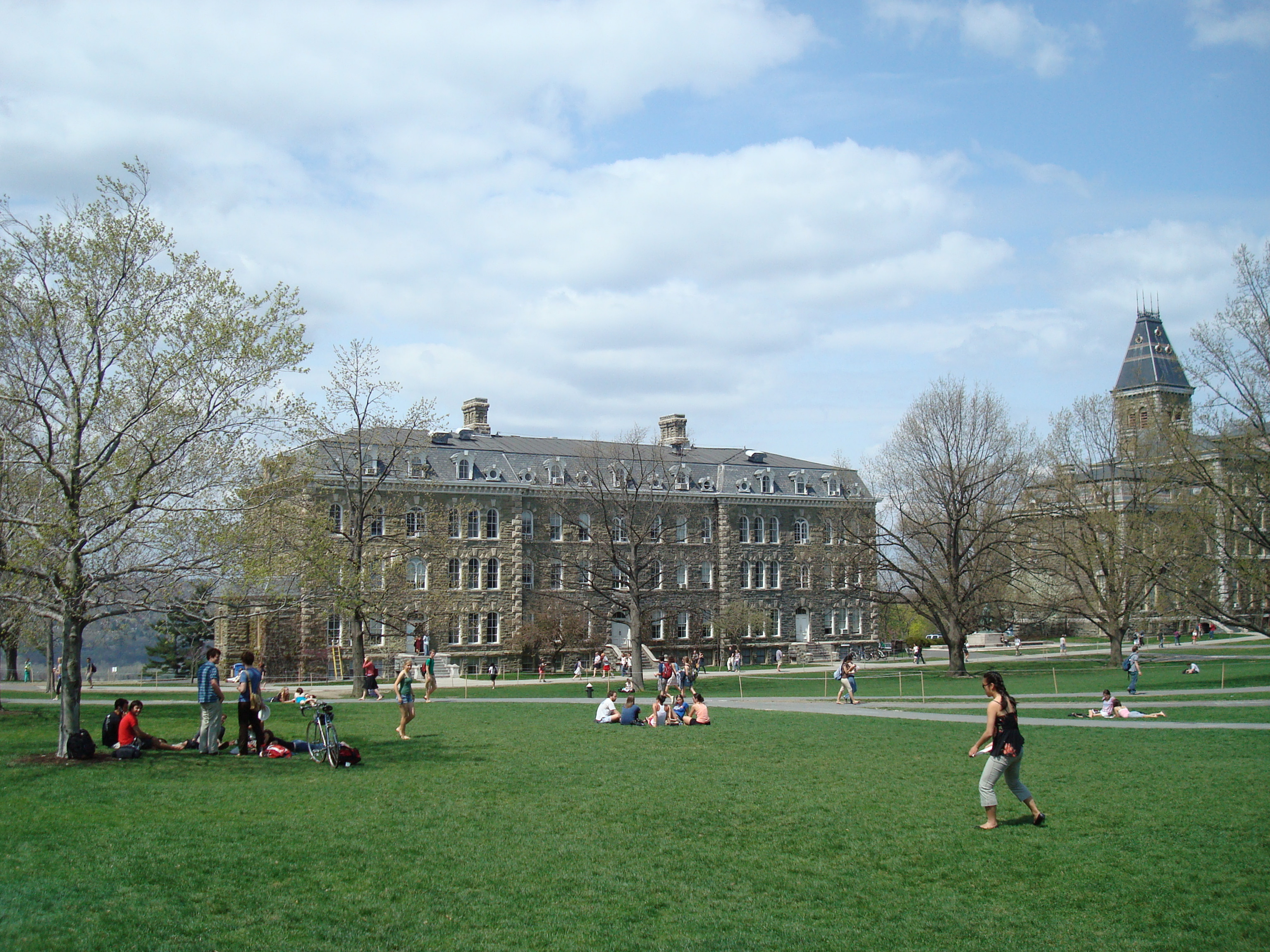
The eastern face of Morrill Hall

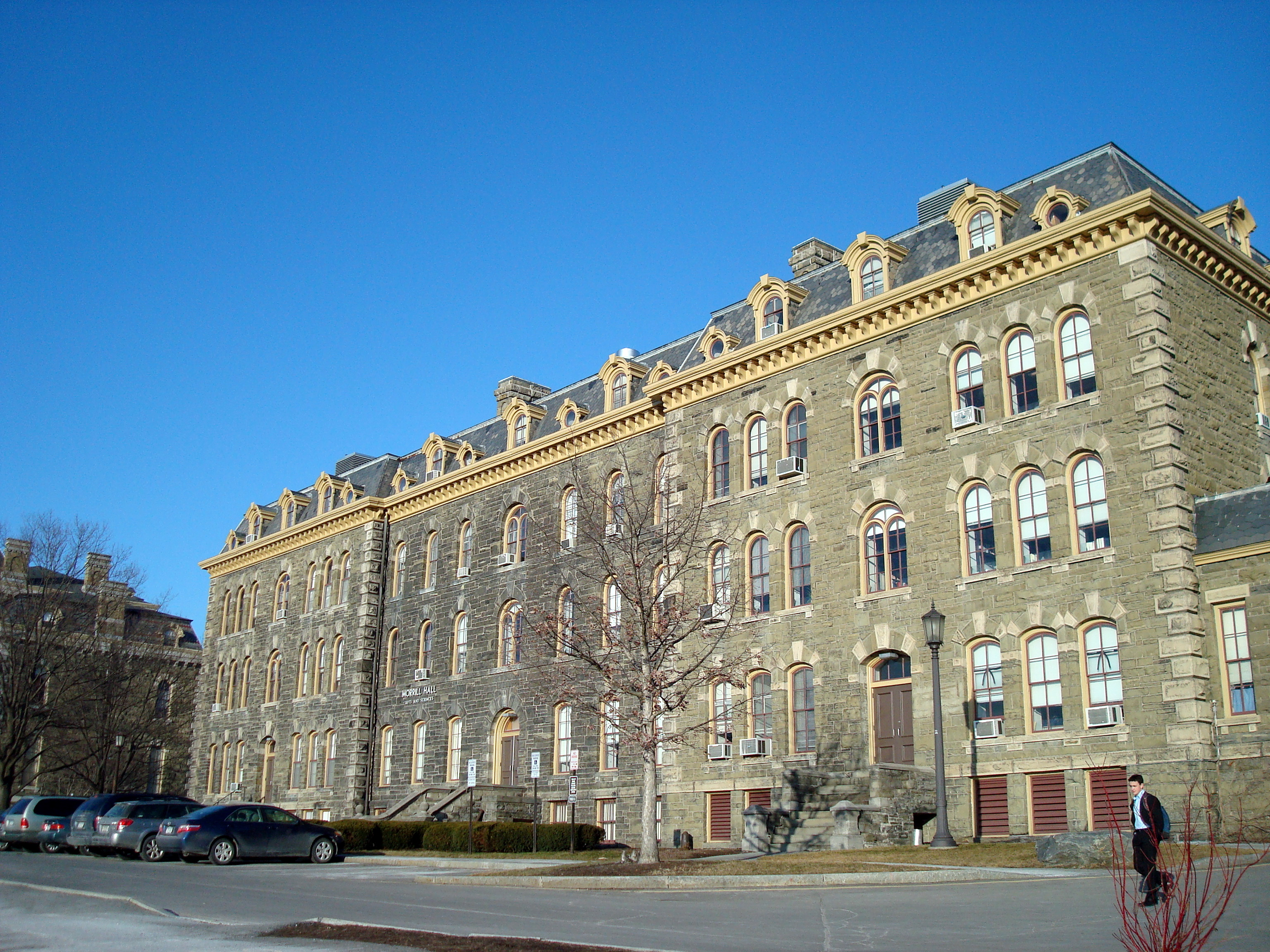
The western face of Morrill Hall, which presently serves as the back of the building

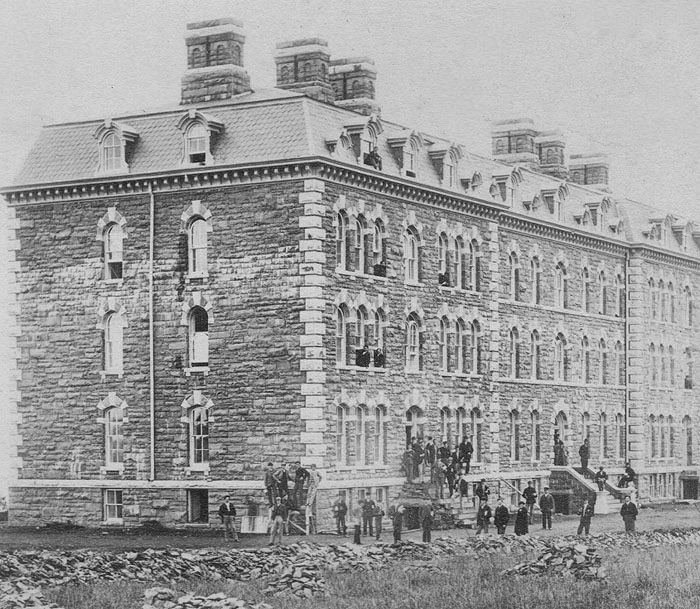
Morrill Hall shortly after completion

Morrill Hall was Cornell University's first newly constructed building, built at a cost of $70,111 and opening on October 7, 1868, as South University Building, or less formally, as South Hall. It is the southernmost of the three buildings which comprise the "Stone Row" which forms the west side of Cornell's Arts Quadrangle, all constructed of Ithaca bluestone quarried from the base of Libe Slope. An early Cornell professor, Goldwin Smith, said dismissively of these three buildings that "nothing can redeem them but dynamite." While all three of these historic buildings remain standing, each has undergone periods of extensive renovation to overcome the limitations of their original structural designs.

While the building primarily provides a home for language-related departments such as Romance Studies, Russian Literature, and Linguistics, Morrill Hall has previously served as the headquarters for a much broader variety of departments. The fourth floor of the building housed the Cornell Law School in its entirety when it first opened in 1887. The Psychology Department was located in Morrill Hall until its current headquarters were established in Uris Hall, and the university Co-Operative store, also known as the Co-Op was located Morrill Hall's basement during the early 20th century.

== Architecture ==
The exterior architectural style of Morrill Hall has been alternatively described as Second Empire and Italian Renaissance. The structure was originally divided into three distinct sections: a southern wing containing student residential suites with room for sixty students; a central academic wing for classrooms, the library, and an auditorium; and a northern wing containing offices. Originally, the sections were not interconnected, and moving from one to the other required exiting and re-entering the building. This segmented structure was designed as a safety feature, as a fire in one wing of the building would be less likely to spread to the other two sections of the structure. The partitions between the three segments of the building were demolished in 1897 as part of a large-scale renovation.

The buildings comprising the Stone Row – Morrill Hall, McGraw Hall, and White Hall – all face westward toward Libe Slope, as the university originally intended to develop the slope area with further construction projects. Later construction efforts, however, focused on the area east of the three historical buildings, leaving them facing the wrong way. Morrill Hall's current interior layout, following a 1973 remodeling, thus runs counter to the original exterior orientation. The structure's three primary entrances and main reception area all open to the eastern face of the building on the Arts Quadrangle, with only one of the original western entrances still in use. Thus, the exterior front of the building now serves functionally as the back of the building.
