= Ehrman Mitchell =

American architect

Ehrman B. Mitchell III
- Born: Harrisburg, Pennsylvania, US
- Occupation: Architect
- Spouse: Hermine Mitchell
- Parent: Ehrman B. Mitchell II & Alice Marie Decevee
- Practice: Mitchell/Giurgola Architects

Ehrman Burkman Mitchell III FRAIA FRAIC (January 25, 1924 - January 18, 2005) was an American architect. He was born in Harrisburg, Pennsylvania in 1924 and graduated from The Hill School in 1941. He then attended the University of Pennsylvania, graduating in 1948. In 1958, he co-founded Mitchell/Giurgola Architects with Romaldo Giurgola.

He served as president of the American Institute of Architects from 1979-1980 and advocated quality design in public architecture.
