= King + King Architects =

American architecture firm in Syracuse, New York

- Company type: Corporation
- Industry: Architecture, Engineering, Interiors, Landscape, Planning
- Founded: 1868
- Founder: Archimedes Russell
- Headquarters: 358 West Jefferson Street; Syracuse, New York
- Number of employees: ~50 people
- Website: kingarch.com

King + King Architects is an architectural, engineering, and planning firm based in Syracuse, New York, United States.

Started by Archimedes Russell in 1868, it is New York state’s oldest, and the third oldest architecture firm in the United States. In 1906 it was called Melvin L. King Architects; then in 1932 it changed to Melvin L. & Harry A. King Architects when Harry King became a partner; in 1945, it changed to Melvin L., Harry A. & Curtis King Architects when Curtis King became a partner, and in 1959 Russell King became a partner — changing the firm’s name to King & King Architects.

The firm has completed more than 40 projects for Syracuse University for over 150 years. The King + King Architecture Library in Slocum Hall at the School of Architecture was inaugurated in 2018.

== Notable designs ==
- National Veterans Resource Center, at Syracuse University (2020)
- E.S. Bird Library, at Syracuse University (1972)
- Niagara Mohawk Building, Syracuse (1932)
