= Cornell Central Campus =

University campus section in Ithaca, US

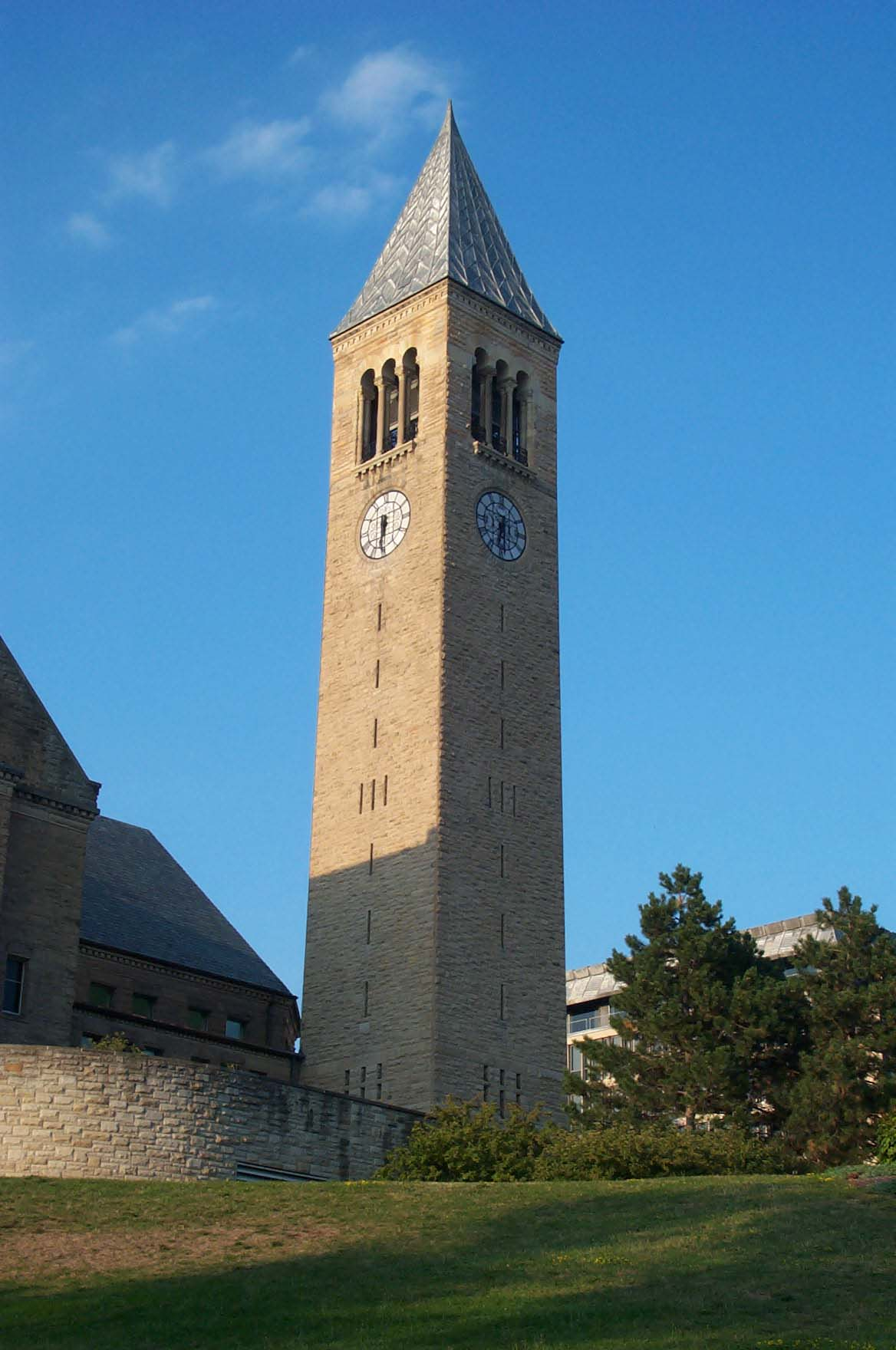
One of the most recognizable buildings on the Cornell University campus, McGraw Tower, at the top of Libe Slope on Cornell's main campus

Central Campus is the primary academic and administrative section of Cornell University's main campus in Ithaca, New York. It is bounded by Libe Slope to its west, Fall Creek to its north, and Cascadilla Creek to its south.

== History ==
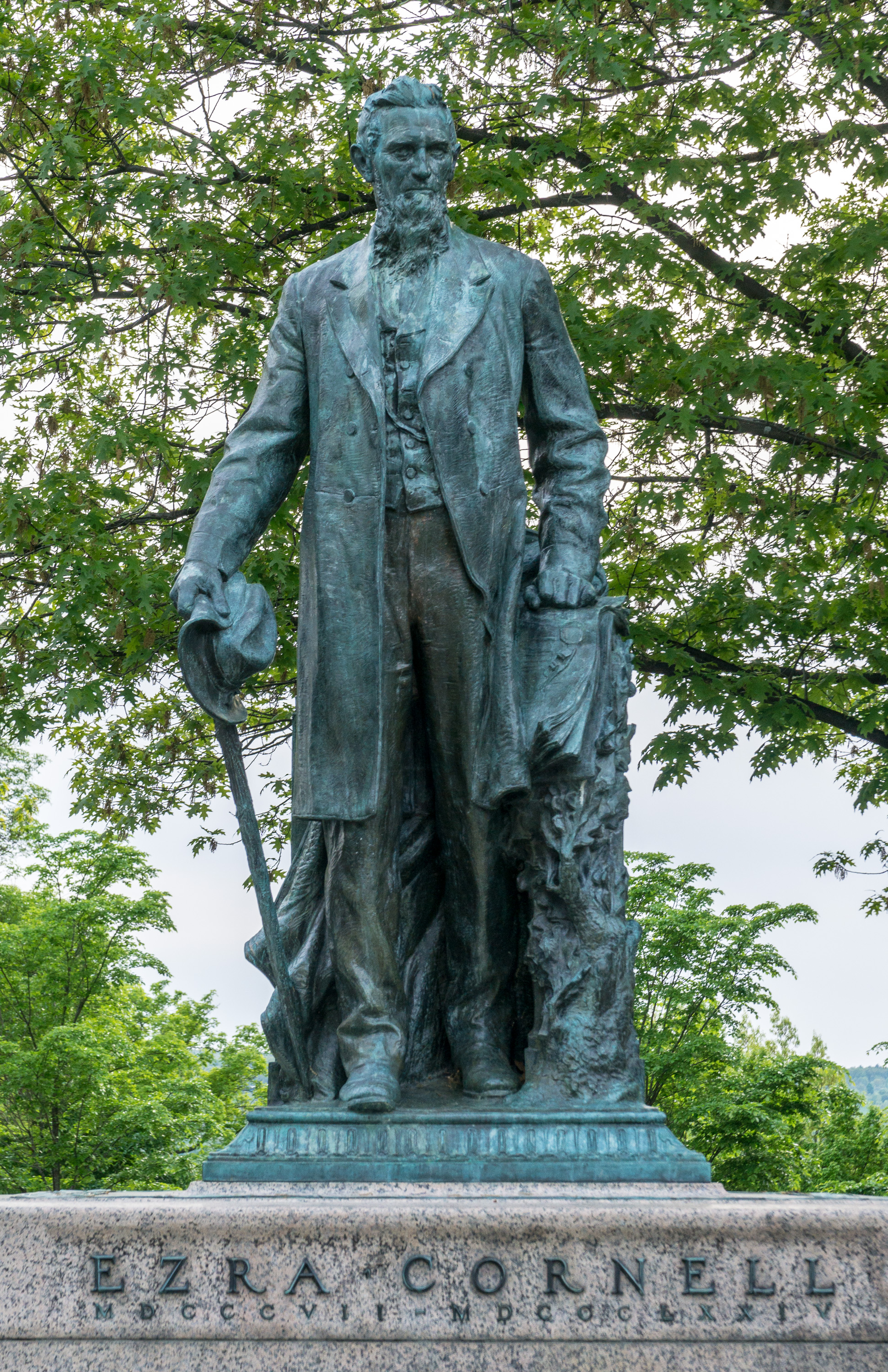
A statue of founder Ezra Cornell by Hermon Atkins MacNeil was dedicated on the Arts Quadrangle in 1919

Ezra Cornell donated his farm for the site of the Cornell University as a part of the package to bring New York's land grant college to Ithaca. With the exception of Cascadilla Hall, no buildings were on the site so the campus evolved based on the hilly terrain and the conflicting visions of its designers, starting with Ezra Cornell and Andrew Dickson White.

Over the years, the Buildings and Properties Committee of Cornell's Board of Trustees has maintained the stewardship of campus planning supported by a Vice President for Planning, Planning Office, and in recent years, a university architect. Periodically, outside architects and consultants, beginning with Frederick Law Olmsted, have been commissioned to develop master plans. Because the entire campus is subject to a special class of zoning, land use decisions are largely made internally rather than by the Ithaca zoning process. However, construction or renovation of statutory college buildings are subject to additional planning steps involving the New York State University Construction Fund Office.

Cornell has historically been reluctant to demolish its buildings, but has repeatedly renovated and found new uses for old structures. Morrill Hall is a National Historic Landmark. In 1971, Ithaca adopted a pioneering landmark and historic preservation ordinance, with the Arts Quadrangle and a number of individual buildings being designated landmarks or historic districts.

Registered historic places on the central campus include: Andrew Dickson White House, Bailey Hall, Caldwell Hall, old Comstock Hall, Deke House, East Roberts Hall (demolished), Fernow Hall, Rice Hall, Roberts Hall (demolished) and Stone Hall (demolished). The two Norwegian spruce trees in front of the Deke House planted by Theodore Roosevelt are on the National Register of Historically Significant Trees. The campus includes more recent, 20th-century buildings that have earned architectural acclaim, especially the I. M. Pei-designed Johnson Art Museum and James Stirling-designed Schwartz Performing Arts Center.

In 2006–2007, Cornell embarked on another in its series of master plans, retaining Urban Strategies Inc. of Toronto as a consultant.

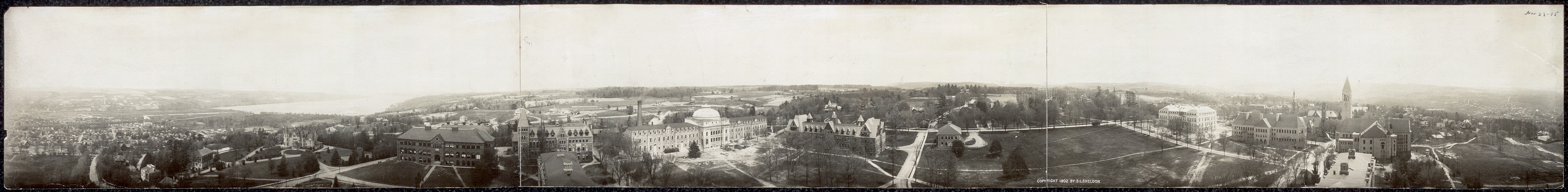
A 1902 cycloramic view of Cornell University from McGraw Hall
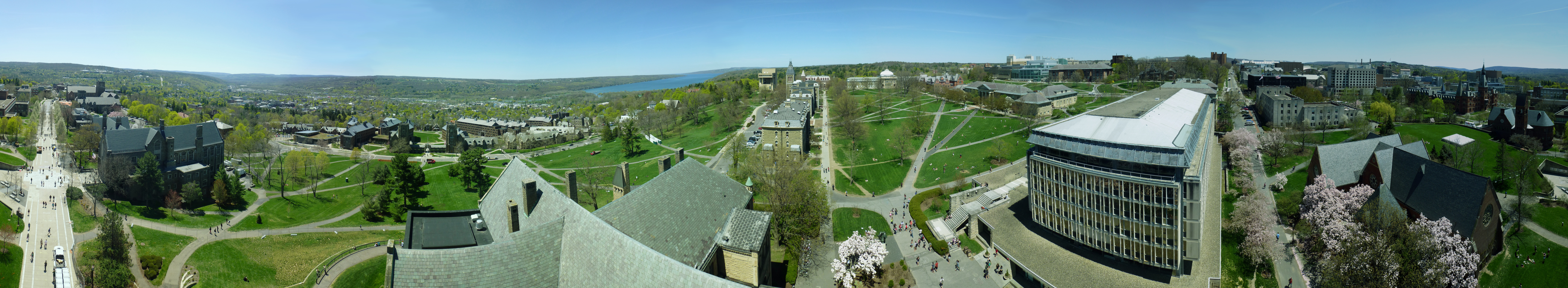
A 2013 panorama of the campus taken from McGraw Tower with Sibley Hall seen in the center

== Arts Quadrangle ==
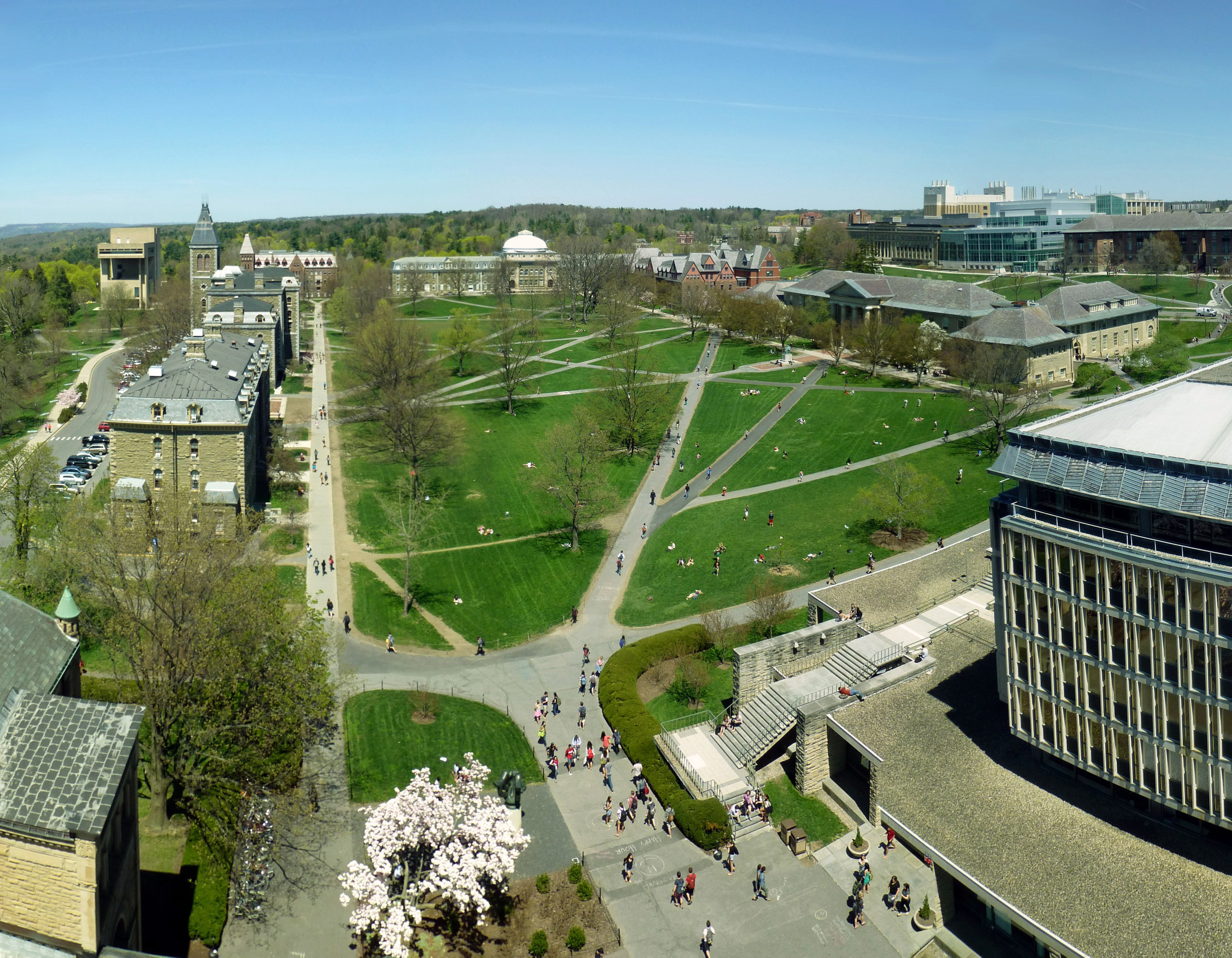
The Cornell Arts Quadrangle as seen from McGraw Tower

The Arts Quad reflects Cornell and White's decision to use a quadrangle model for organizing academic buildings around formal open spaces. The quadrangle started with the "stone row" along the ridge of Libe Slope—Morrill (1866) and White (1867) Halls (both by Buffalo architects Wilcox and Porter), and McGraw (1869). Both McGraw and West Sibley (1870) Halls were designed by Syracuse architect Archimedes Russell.

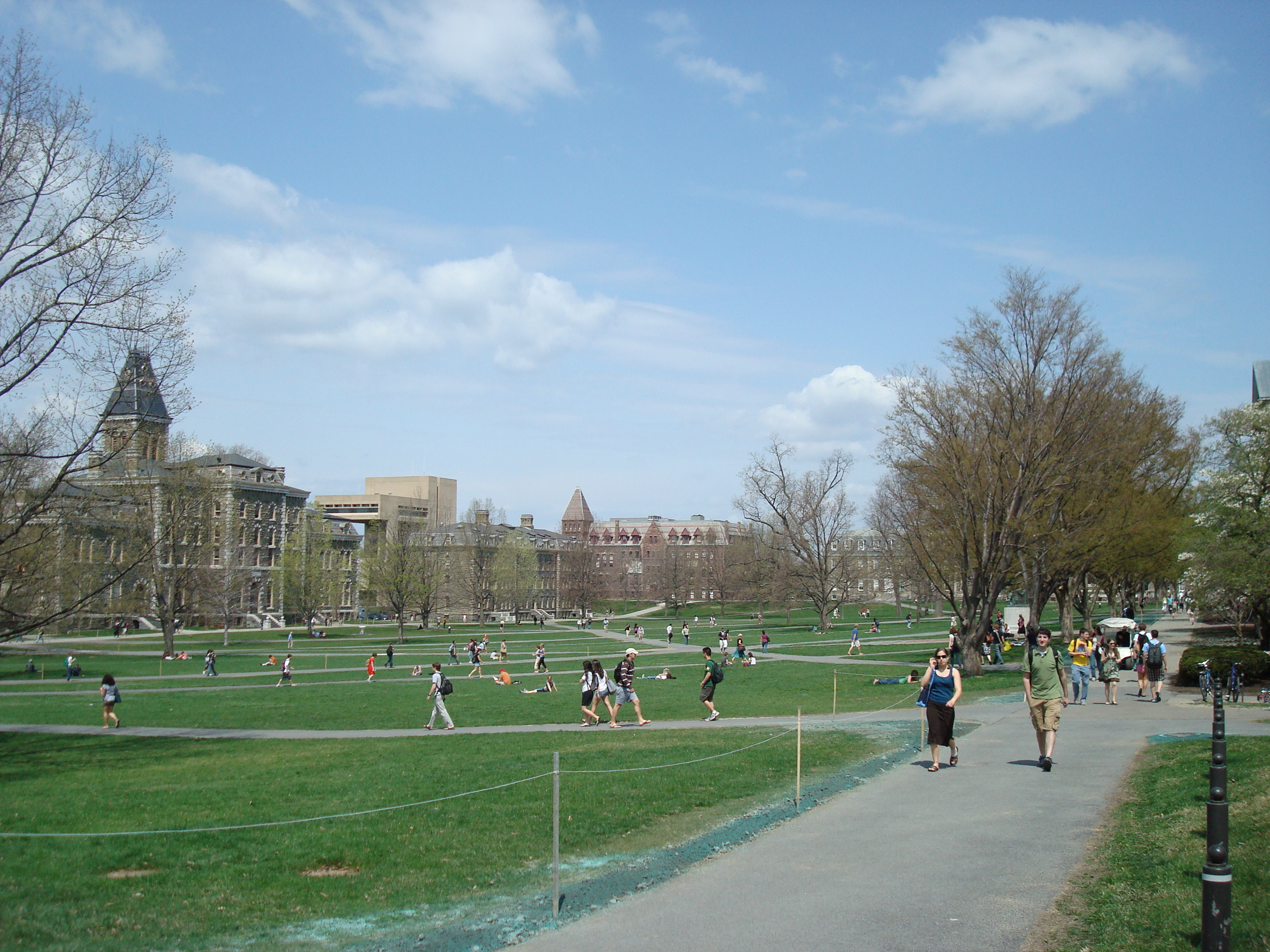
A view of the Arts Quad on a sunny spring day.

There were tensions between Cornell's preference for practical designs while White favored a more classical design. Hence although the Stone Row was built from native gray siltstone (nicknamed "llenroc"), later buildings including Lincoln Hall, Sage Residential College and Sage Chapel were built from red brick. Originally, the Arts Quadrangle was proposed to be a square extending to the east to the site of Baker Laboratory and Rockefeller Hall. The subsequent construction of Lincoln Hall and Goldwin Smith Hall, however, ended up defining it as a rectangle, with its long dimension oriented north–south.

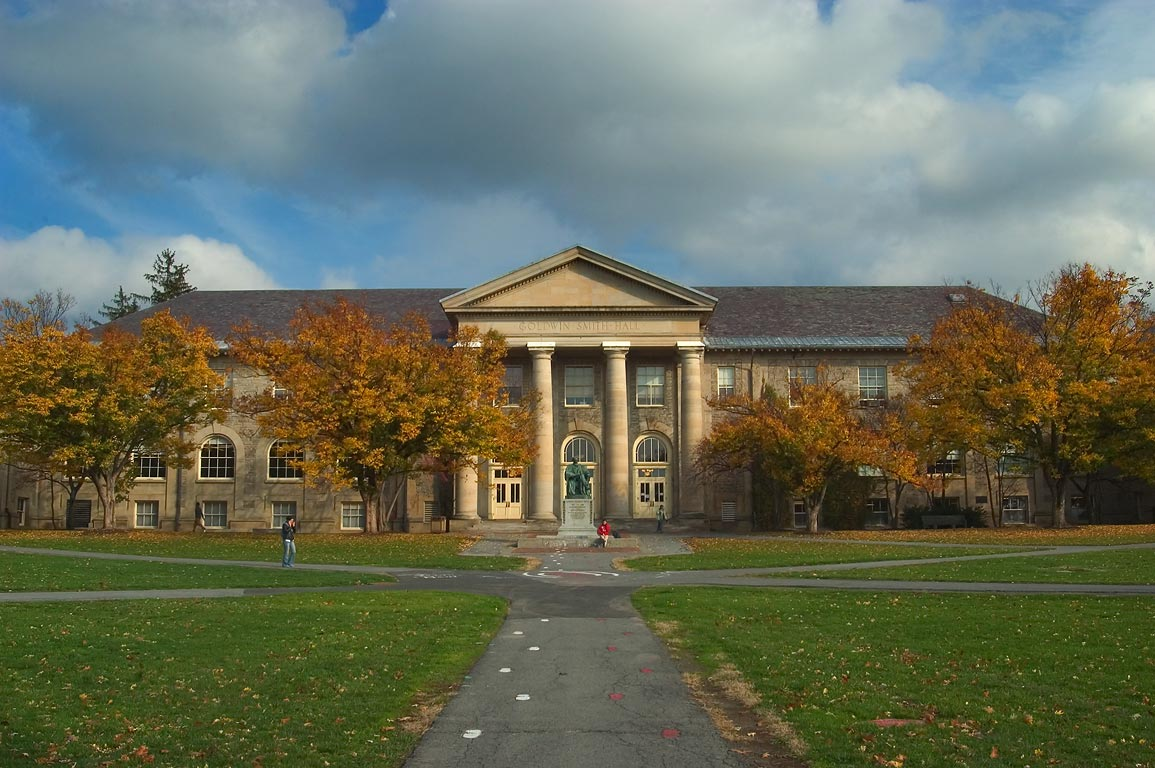
Goldwin Smith Hall viewed across the Arts Quad

By 1871, Cornell had established one of the United States' early architecture schools, and many campus buildings built in the last quarter of the Nineteenth Century were designed by the architecture school's professors and students. Hence, Cornell's first architecture professor, Charles Babcock, received many important commissions. Franklin (1882; now Tjaden) and Lincoln (1888) Halls reflect Babcock's interpretation of the Romanesque Revival style. William H. Miller, who studied architecture under Cornell President Andrew D. White, also employed the Romanesque Revival style in the design of Uris Library (dedicated 1891), which has grown to iconically represent Cornell. Uris Library was expanded from its original cross shape twice—first to expand the library stacks in 1937 and to add underground reading rooms overlooking Libe Slope in 1982.

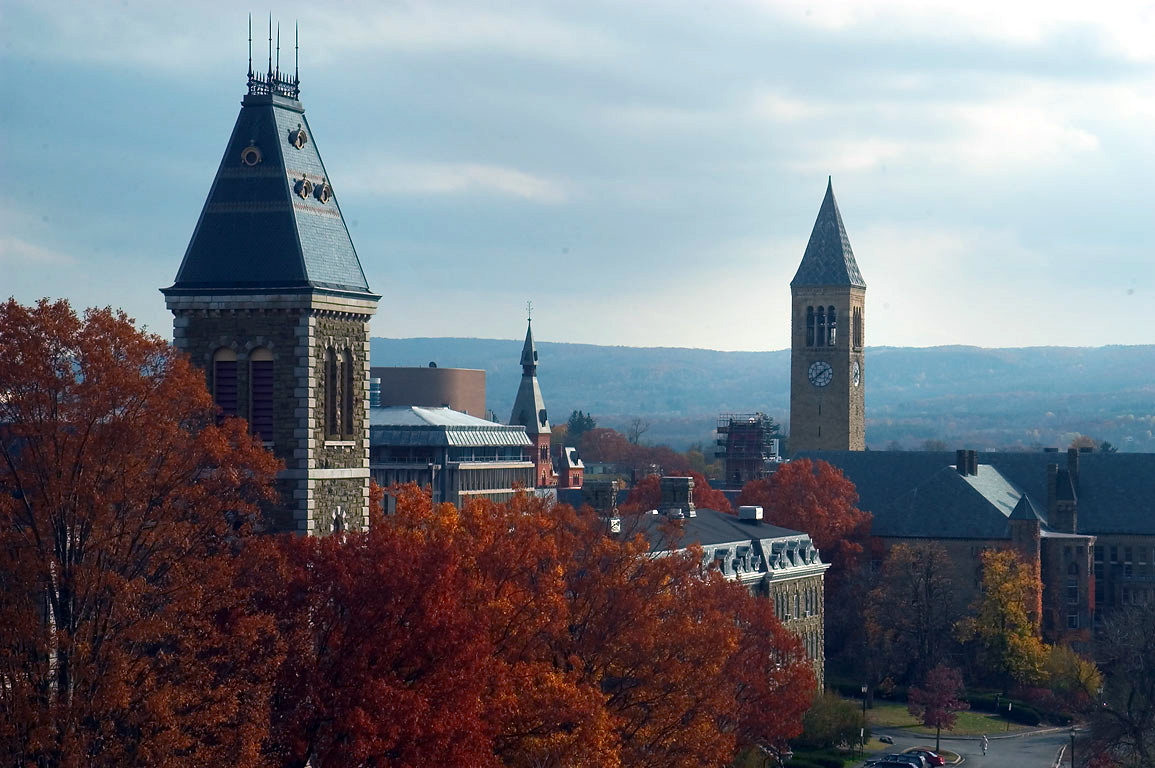
Old Stone Row on the Arts Quadrangle with (left to right) McGraw and Morrill Halls, and Uris Library)

Miller's Stimson Hall (1902), and the Sibley Dome (1902), by Arthur N. Gibb (who also graduated from the Cornell architecture school), reflect Neoclassical themes. Cornell shifted to outside architects, the nationally prominent firm of Carrère and Hastings, to design Goldwin Smith Hall (1904) and the adjacent Sheldon Memorial Exedra and Sundial (installed 1910), also in a Neoclassical style. Goldwin Smith Hall began as a modest building with an east–west orientation, but the 1904 expansion to its south converted it into the focal point of the east side of the Quad.

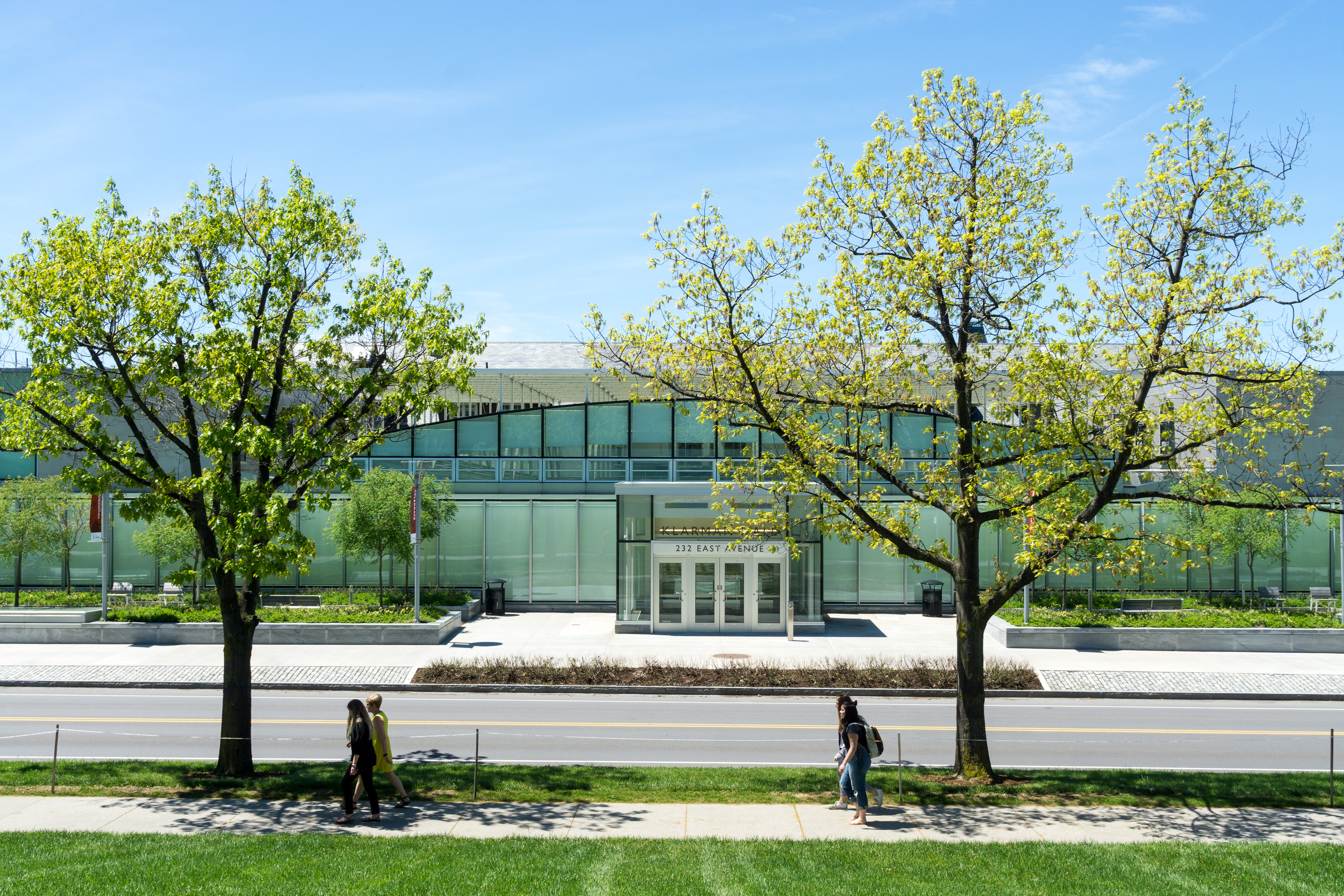
Klarman Hall

Klarman Hall, a new humanities building built in the space between the back of Goldwin Smith Hall and East Avenue, was completed in 2016. The new building is connected to Goldwin Smith Hall with a 7,700 square foot glass covered atrium and creates 33,250 square feet of assignable space for classrooms and offices.

Next to Stimson Hall was Miller-designed Boardman Hall, constructed to house the Law School in 1892, anchored the south end of the Quad until it was demolished in 1959.

At the center of the Arts Quad are statues of Cornell and White facing each other from the western and eastern edges of the quad. In 1959, Boardman Hall was demolished and replaced with the 240,026 sq ft (22,299.1 m^{2}) John M. Olin Graduate Library (1960), designed by Warner, Burns, Toan & Lunde. The Carl Kroch Library, which opened on August 24, 1992, is underground between Stimson and Goldwin Smith Halls and is accessible through Olin Library. A new wing was added to the rear of Lincoln Hall in 2000. It incorporates new space for the Sidney Cox Library of Music and Dance, a large rehearsal facility, a gamelan room, and expanded studio and practice room space.

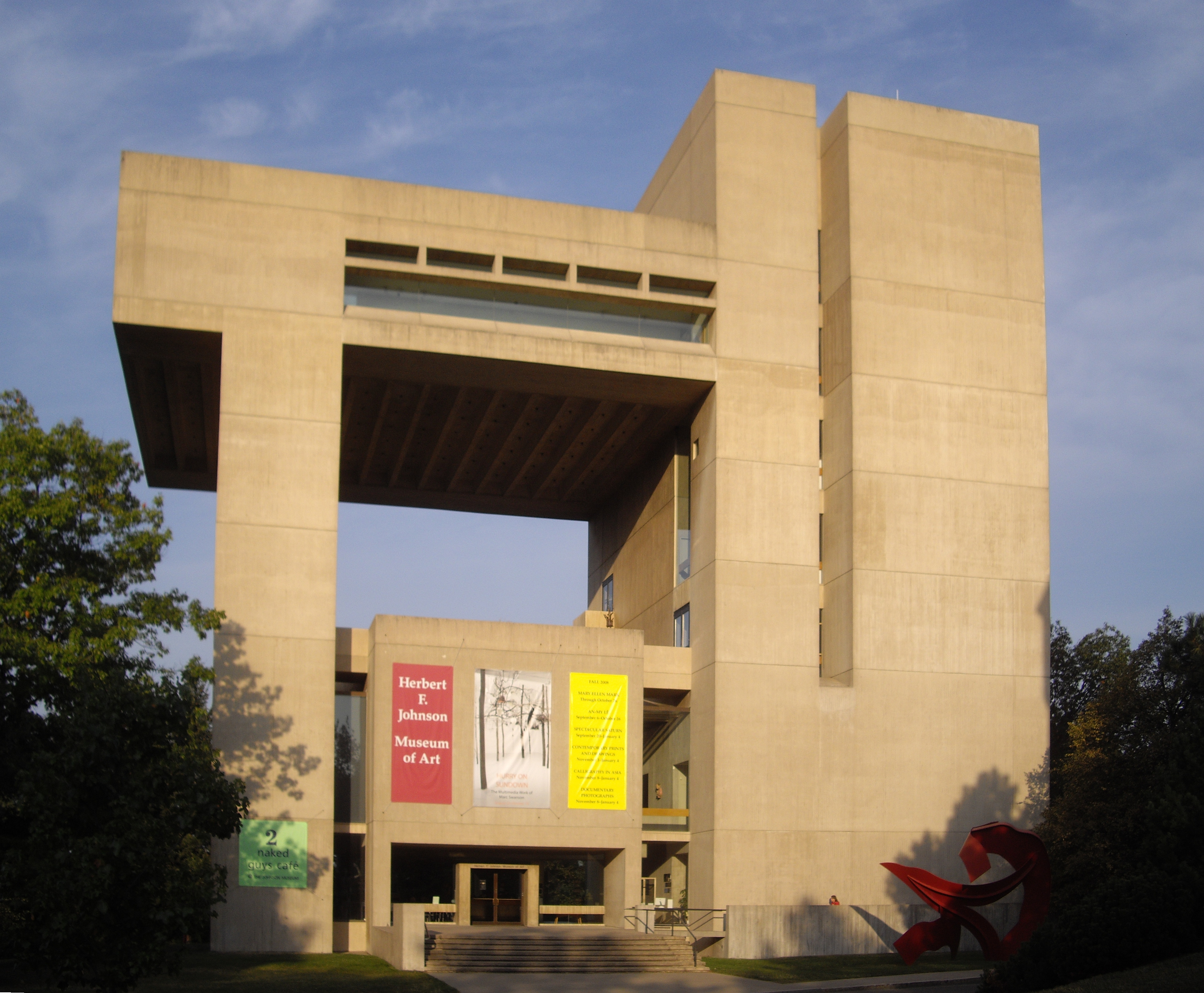
Herbert F. Johnson Museum of Art

To the west of Tjaden Hall is the Herbert F. Johnson Museum of Art, built in 1973 and designed by I.M. Pei. The original design included an underground gallery north of the main structure. Early designs extended this space under University Avenue and included windows overlooking Fall Creek gorge. This gallery was not built due to funding. However, in response to a dramatic increase in the museum's collection, an altered version of that addition, totaling 16,000 square feet (1,500 m^{2}) of above and below ground space was built to the north of the existing building. It was designed by the original building's architects at Pei Cobb Freed & Partners, including the original architect-in-charge, Cornell alumnus John L. Sullivan, III and opened in October 2011. Previously, Morse Hall stood next to Franklin/Tjaden Hall, but it was destroyed by a fire in 1916. Minor support buildings include Rand Hall (1911) designed by Gibb and Waltz and the Foundry (1883).

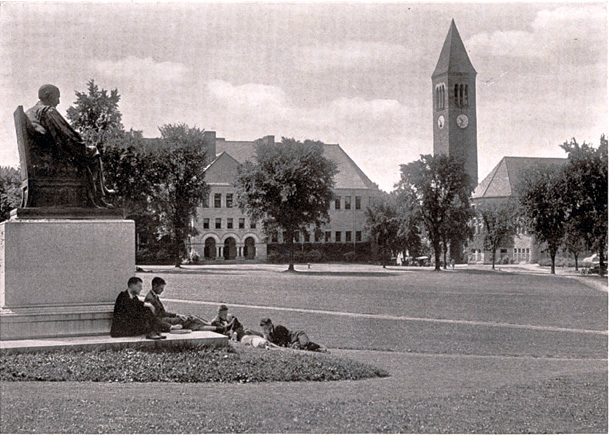
Boardman Hall was demolished in 1959.

Milstein Hall, a new 43,000-square-foot (4,000 m^{2}) facility designed by Rem Koolhaas was built on the parking lot behind Sibley Hall and opened in 2011. It connects to Sibley and Rand Hall and provides 25,000 square feet of studio space for the College of Architecture, Art, and Planning and contains a 250-seat auditorium. The building is cantilevered over University Avenue. During 2007–2010, while Milstein Hall was pending, second year architecture students used rented studio space on Esty Street.

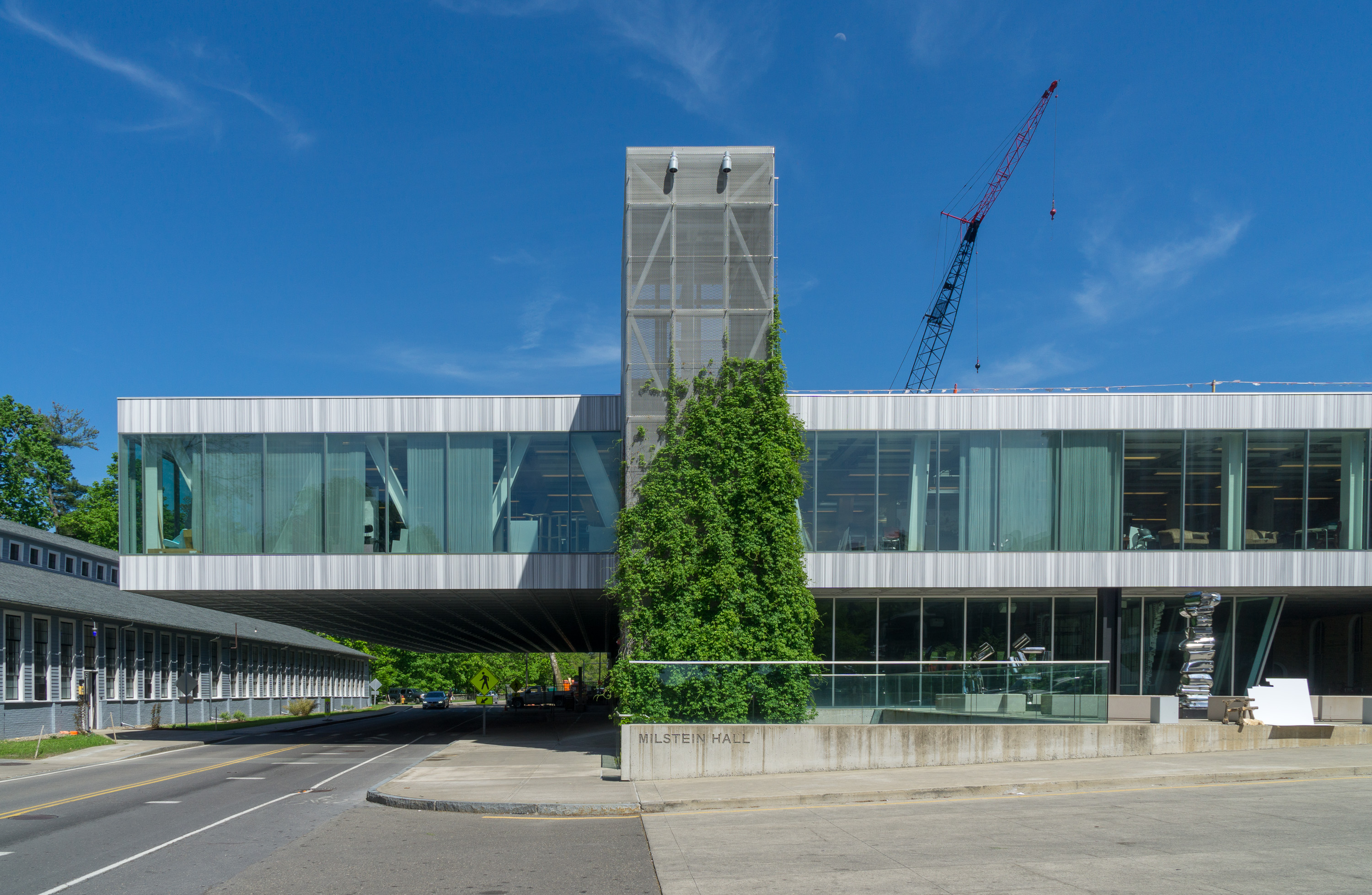
Milstein Hall

The landscaping of the Arts Quad is mostly informal and was historically dominated by towering elm trees. After Dutch elm disease swept the campus, a new row of Zelcova trees was planted in the 1970s along the sidewalk on the eastern edge of the quad. These trees were selected for their vase shape (which are similar to elms trees), but grow much slower than the elms which they replaced. The sidewalk on the northern edge is also significant because I.M. Pei aligned window slots in the Art Museum on the sidewalk's axis to preserve a view of West Hill through the museum.

== Engineering Quadrangle ==
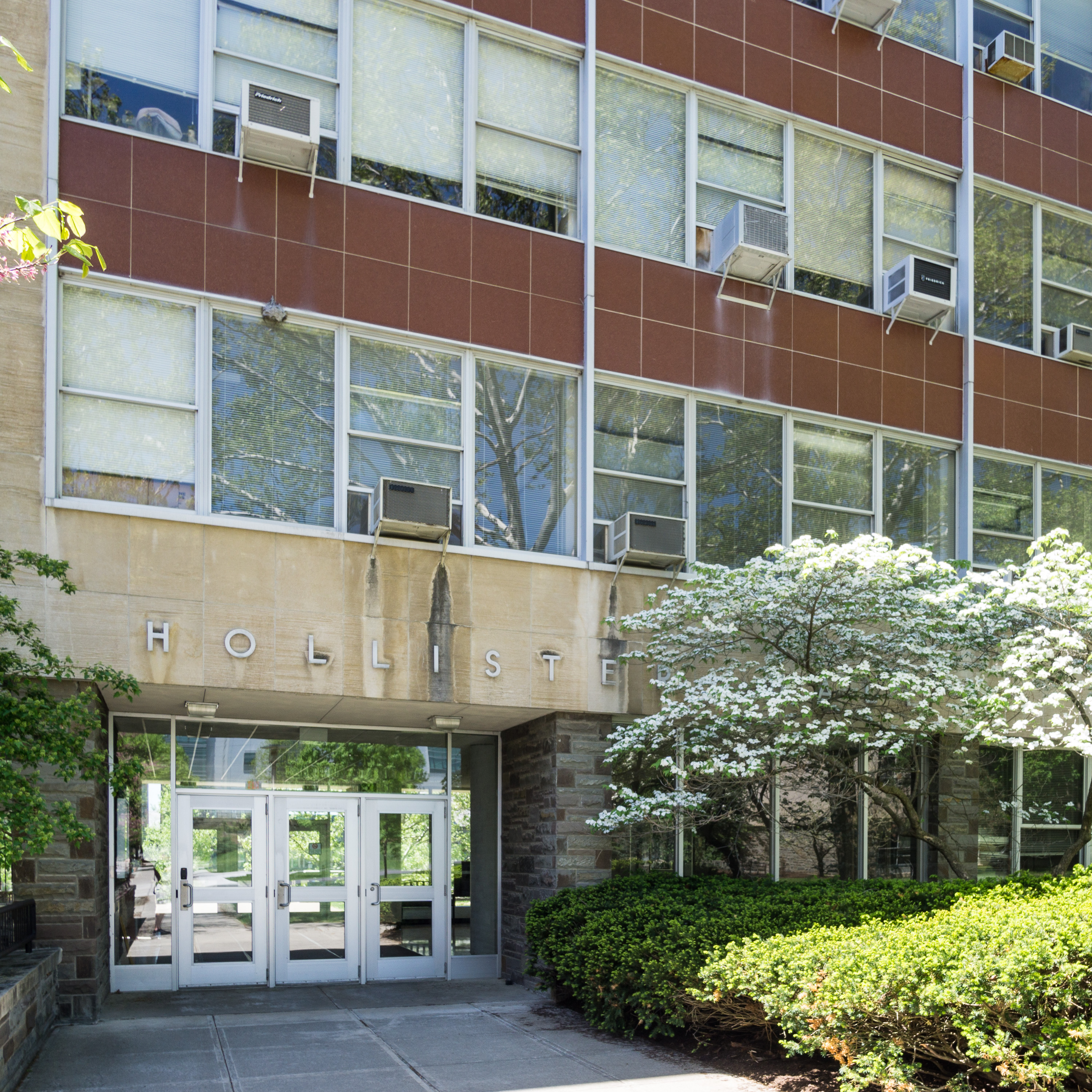
Hollister Hall

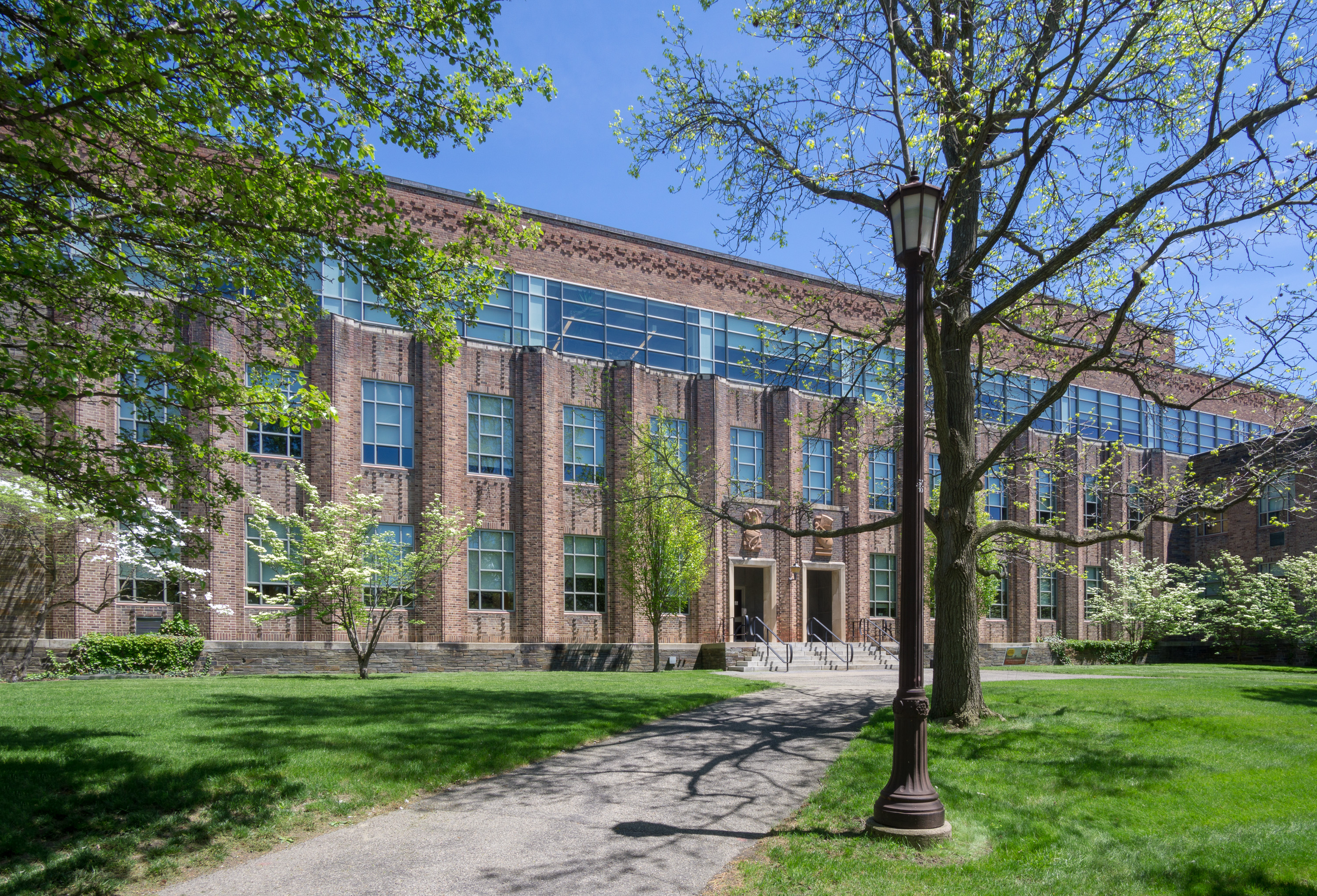
Olin Hall

The Engineering Quad was designed in the 1940s and 1950s on a site at the south end of the central campus previously occupied by the Old Armory and faculty housing, using a master plan developed by the Perkins and Will firm. It has undergone major changes in recent years, particularly with the completion of Duffield Hall. Prior to its construction, Engineering programs were housed in Lincoln Hall, Sibley Hall, Morse Hall and Franklin Hall at the north end of the Arts Quad. In 2004, landscaping renovation with a design inspired by Cascadilla Gorge was completed and its landmark Pew Sundial (designed by Dale Corson) was restored to its rightful place on the quad (after having been stored in Upson Hall during the construction period). Also, modern and open collaborative working spaces were introduced with the construction of a large atrium connecting Duffield, which houses research and teaching facilities for nanoscale science and engineering, with Phillips and Upson (1956) Halls. Connected to Upson Hall, away from the quad, are Grumman Hall (1957), which was built to house a Graduate School of Aerospace Engineering, and Frank H.T. Rhodes Hall designed by Gwathmey & Siegel (1990), which currently houses the Cornell Theory Center.

On the southern end of the Quad, next to Upson and near Cascadilla Creek, are Kimball, Thurston and Bard (1963) Halls, all part of a single brick and concrete structure. Thurston is the home to the Theoretical and Applied Mathematics department, and Bard Hall the home of the Material Sciences department. Between Upson and Kimball stands Ward Hall (1963), the soon to be closed down and former building for nuclear sciences. Next to Bard, and across the street from the Cornell Law School, stand Snee Hall (1984), which houses the Geology Department, and Hollister Hall, (1957) which houses Civil Engineering. Carpenter Hall (1956), containing the Engineering Library, stands next to Hollister on the northwestern corner. The edge of northern face of the quad, mostly open space, is lined with trees along Campus Road. Across Campus Road is Franklin W. Olin Jr. Hall (1942), home of the School of Chemical and Biomolecular Engineering.

=== Bill & Melinda Gates Hall ===
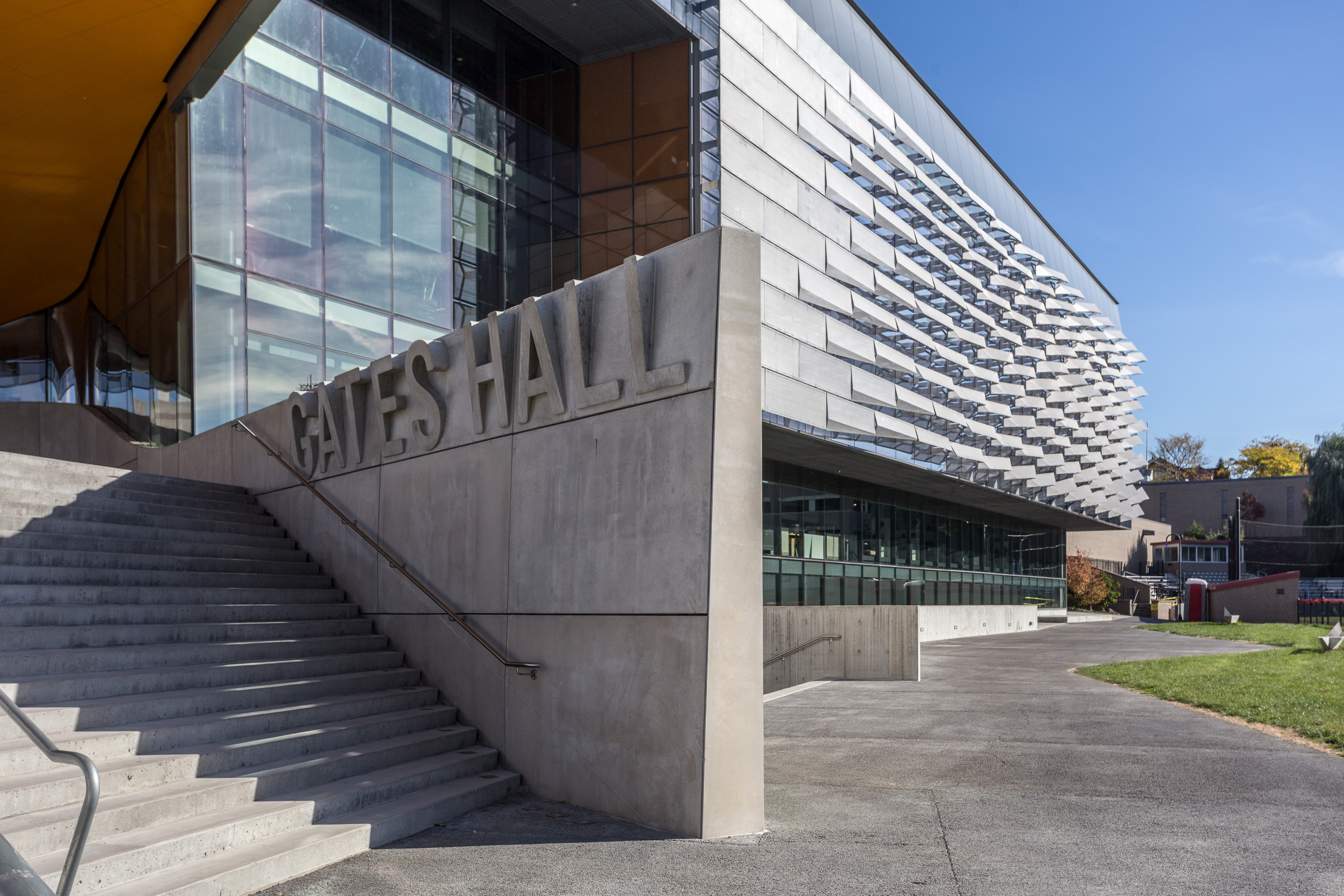
Bill & Melinda Gates Hall

In March 2012, construction began on Bill & Melinda Gates Hall. The building, funded in part by a $25 million gift from the Bill and Melinda Gates Foundation, is located across Campus Road from Barton Hall and east of Phillips Hall, across Hoy Road, on the site of a parking lot for Hoy Field and Grumman Squash Courts. The building is home to the Department of Computer Science, previously located in Upson Hall, and the Department of Information Science, formerly located off campus. The 100,000 square foot building was designed by Pritzker Prize winning architect Thom Mayne. The budgeted cost of the building was $60 million to complete and was funded entirely from outside sources without the need for any additional debt. Gates Hall is expected to earn at least silver LEED certification. Occupancy of the building began in early 2014 and the building was dedicated in October 2014.

== Agriculture Quadrangle ==
=== Main Ag Quadrangle ===
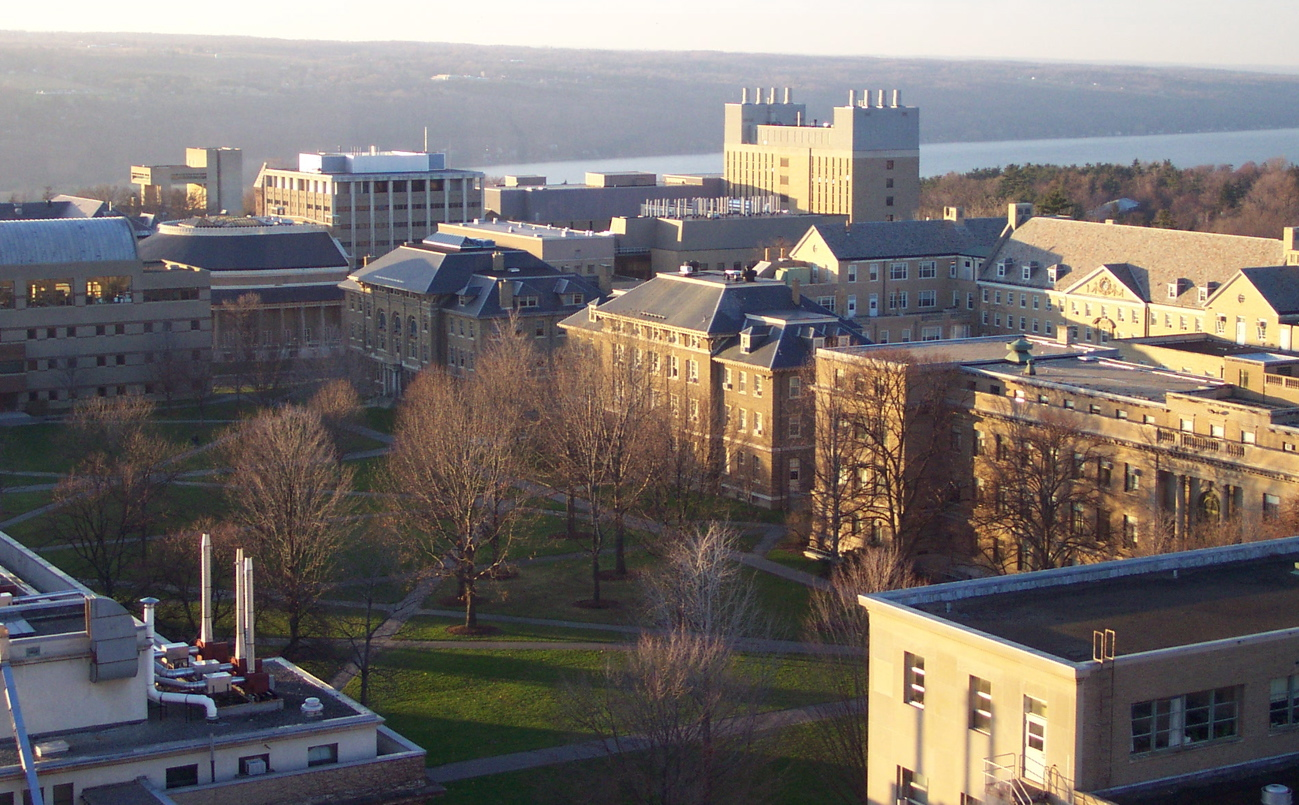
The Agriculture Quad seen from Bradfield Hall with Ithaca's West Hill and Cayuga Lake in the background

The Agriculture Quadrangle (Ag Quad) contains buildings which house many of the programs in the College of Agriculture and Life Sciences. It is a quadrangle east of the Arts Quad and west of the College of Veterinary Medicine. The oldest building still standing on the quad is Caldwell Hall, in the Colonial Revival style, which opened in 1913. The Plant Science Building opened in 1931 and Warren Hall, across from Plant Science, opened in the next year, The art deco style Mann Library on the eastern end of the quad, connecting Warren Hall on the north to the Plant Sciences Building on the south, opened in 1952. Between Plant Science and Tower Road is the greenhouses built in 1931 to house Liberty Hide Bailey's palm collection and the Minns Garden. Designed by Gwathmey & Siegel and completed in 1990, Keith Kennedy and the "new" Roberts Halls, featuring an archway that connects the two halls, extend along the western face of the quad, having replaced the original Roberts Hall (1906) and East Roberts Hall and Stone Hall. The Computing and Communications Center (formerly named Comstock Hall), which was designed by Cornell faculty members Clarence Martin, Jean Hebrard, and George Young, stands between Roberts and Caldwell Halls. The quad now opens toward the south with the Minns Garden between Roberts and Plant Science.

To the west of Roberts Hall is Bailey Hall (1912). It is the largest auditorium on the campus. Both Bailey Hall and "old" Comstock Hall are historic landmarks.

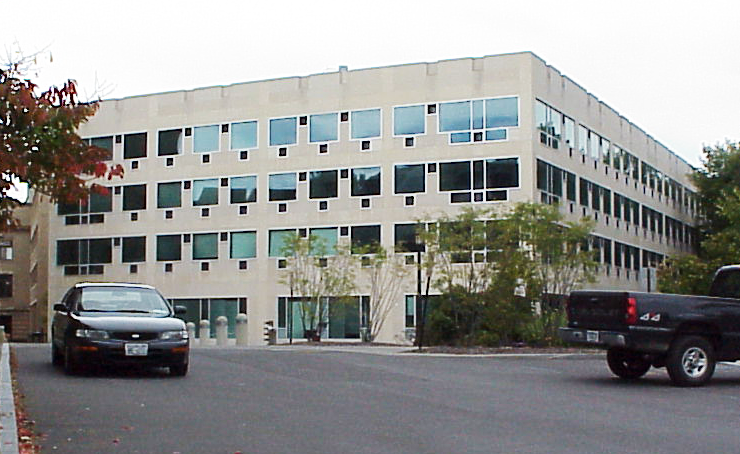
Mann Library Extension finished in 2000. Designed by Edward Larrabee Barnes and John MY Lee Associates. Finished by Lee/Timchula Architects.

The most recent addition has been a 105,372 sq ft (9,789.4 m^{2}) expansion of Mann Library to the northeast, designed by Lee Timchula and opened in 2000.

=== Human Ecology ===
Since 1933, the home economics/human ecology programs have been housed in Martha van Renssalaer Hall (MVR), a 171,648 sq ft (15,946.6 m^{2}) Georgian Revival style brick building designed by William Haugaard located between the Ag Quad and Beebe Lake. In 1968, a dramatic, cantilevered wing designed by Ulrich Franzen was added to the North side of MVR overlooking Beebe Lake. However, the building was declared structurally unsafe in 2001 and abandoned. In the meantime, a west wing was built to house the human nutrition labs as a link between the main MVR and the north wing, but it opened in 2002, after the north wing was closed. The North wing was demolished in 2006, and construction began in 2008 to replace it with an 88,228-square-foot (8,196.6 m^{2}) teaching and laboratory building atop a 290 car parking garage. The lead architect is Darko Hreljanovic, a 1977 graduate of Cornell's architecture college. The new building opened in 2012.

=== Eastern buildings ===
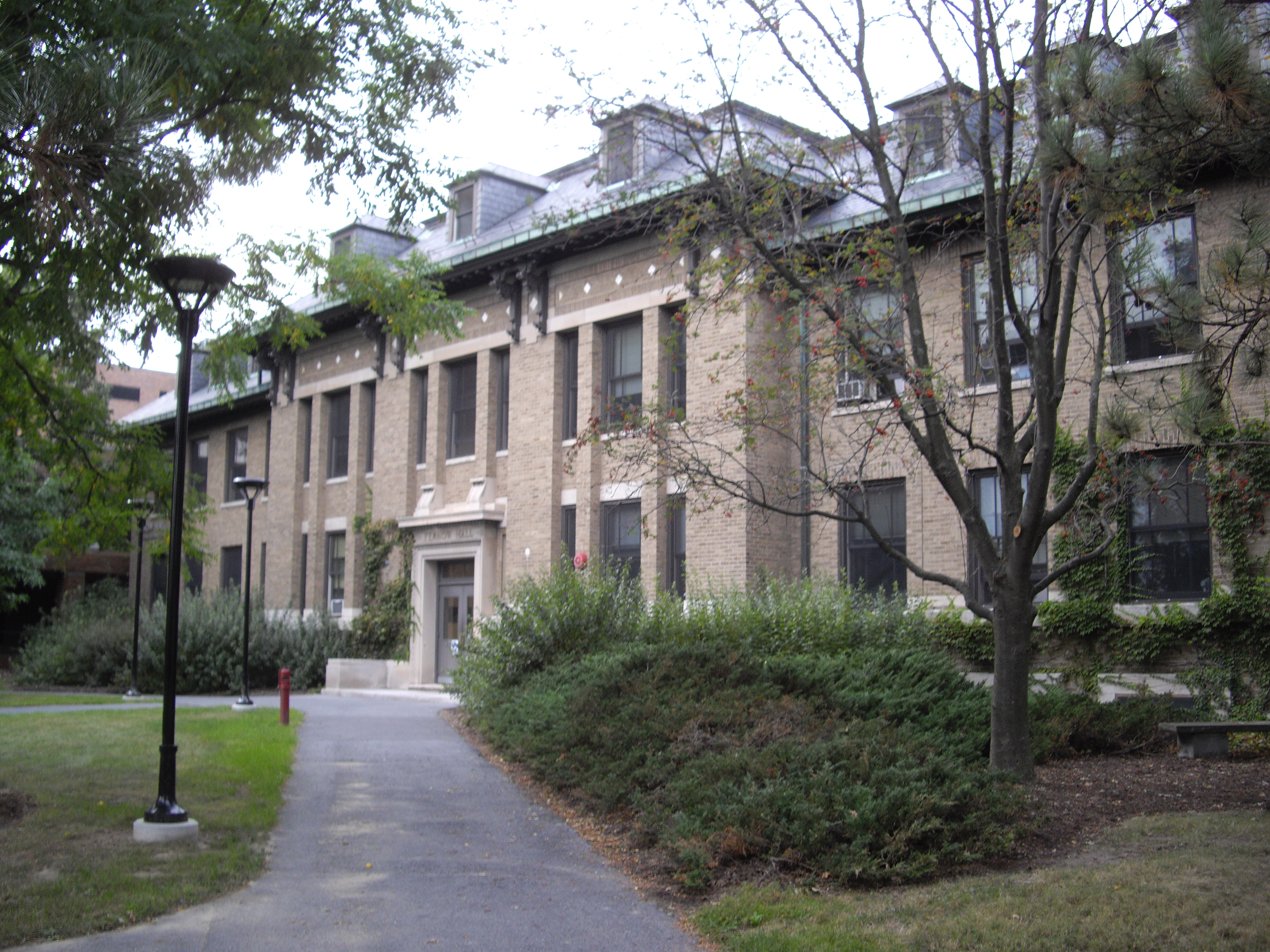
Fernow Hall facing Tower Road

To the east of the Plant Science Building are Emerson Hall and Bradfield Hall (agronomy), both constructed in 1968 also designed by Ulrich Franzen to complement his MVR north wing. Fernow Hall (1915) was built as consolation by New York State in the wake of the closure of the New York State College of Forestry at Cornell to house an environmental sciences program. Other buildings are:

- The Poultry Houses
- Bruckner Lab
- Rice Hall (1912)
- Beebe Hall
- The Insectary Complex
- The Kenneth Post Greenhouses
- Dimock Lab
- Federal Nutrition Lab (and greenhouses) houses programs of the U.S. Department of Agriculture. Just south of the Plant Sciences Building is the Minns Garden.

=== South of Tower Road ===
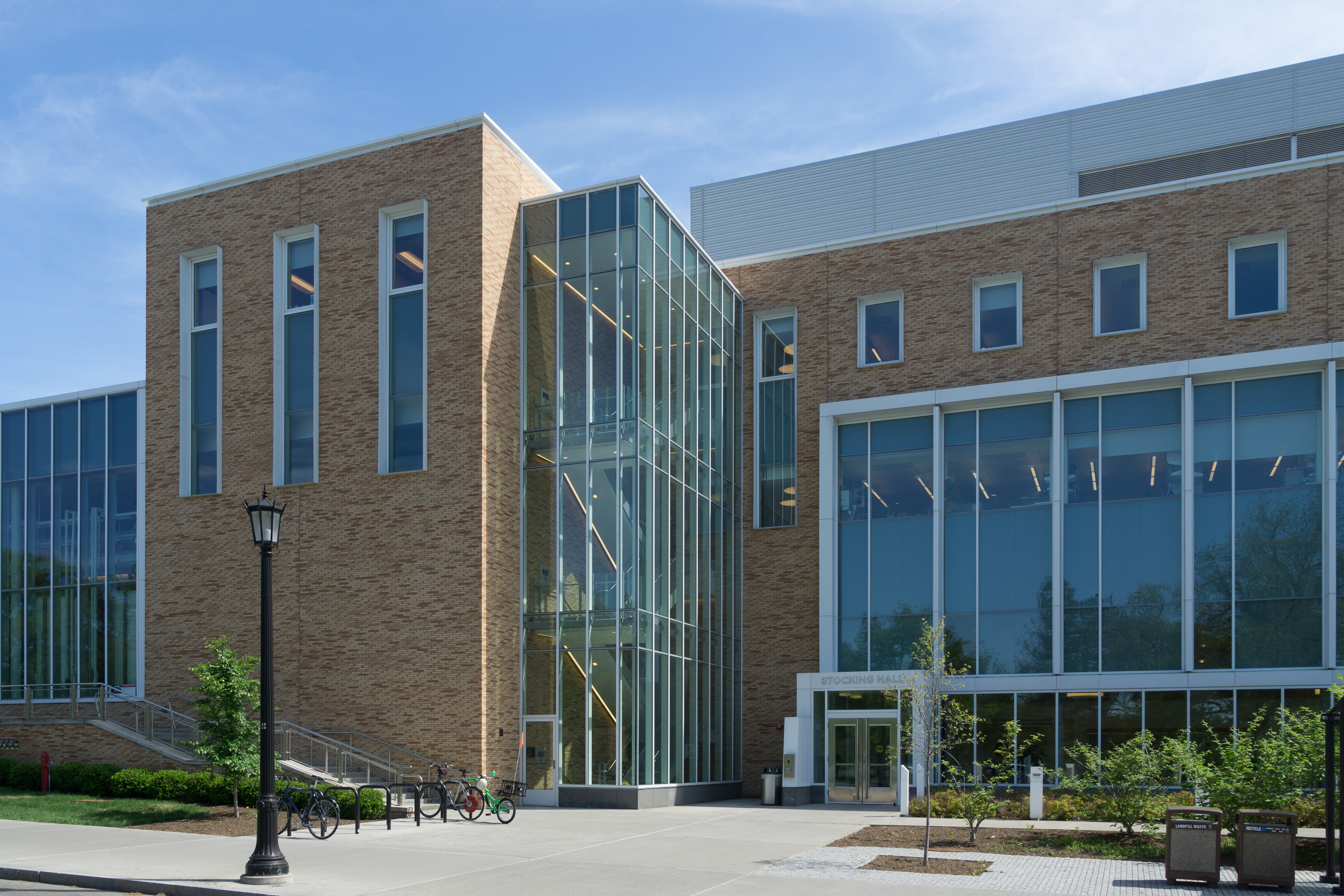
Stocking Hall

Across Tower Road on the south side at the east end of Alumni Fields are:

- Stocking Hall with the Dairy Bar
- Wing Hall (Wing Hall is statutory and owned by NY State, but its 1965 wing is endowed and owned by Cornell)
- Riley-Robb Hall (Biological engineering)
- Morrison Hall (1961)
- Nematode Lab (1937)

== Alumni Fields, Athletics, and Biology Buildings ==
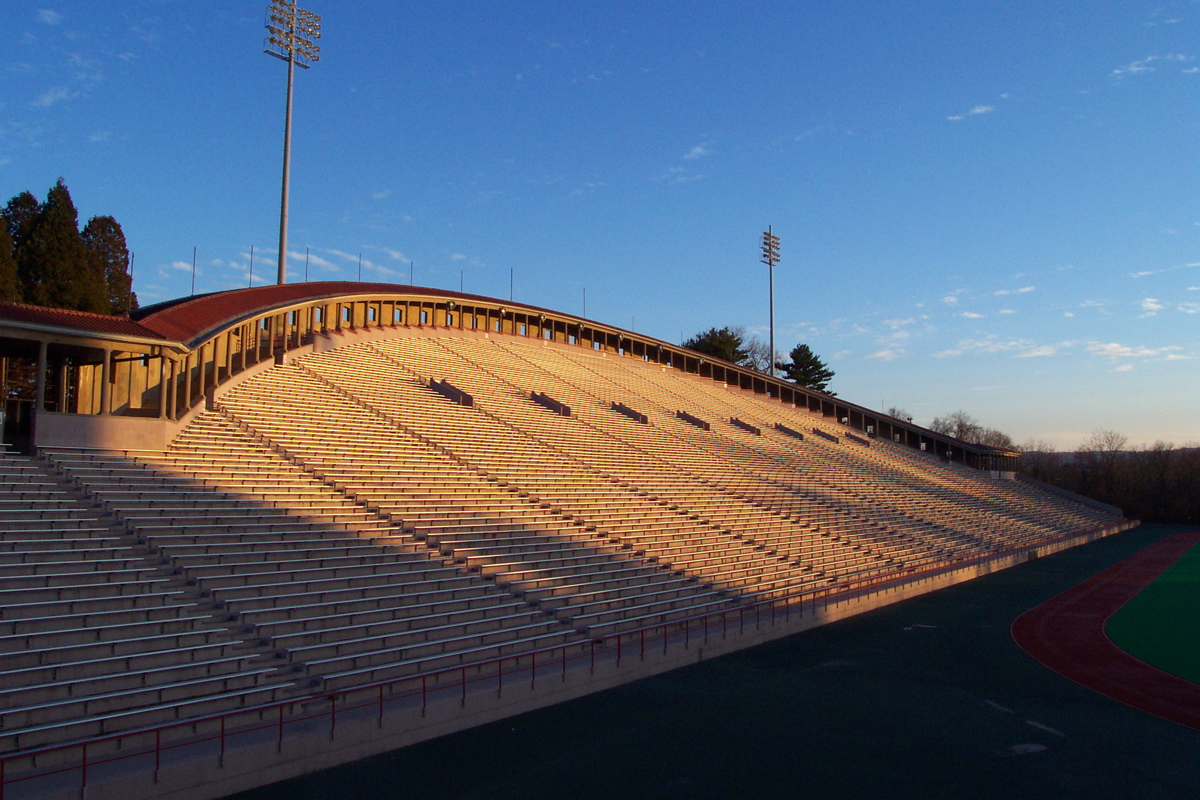
The crescent of Schoellkopf Field

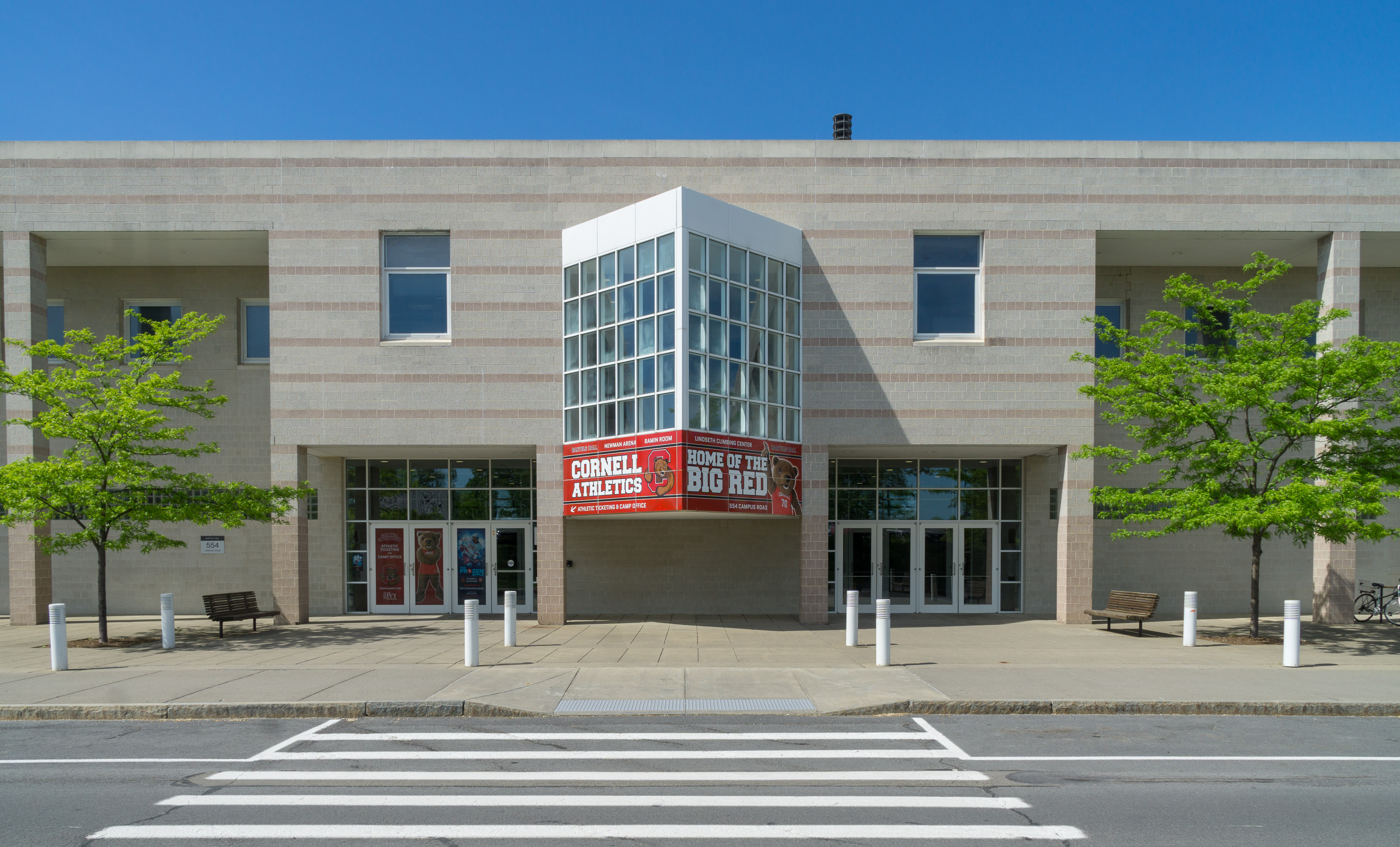
Bartels Hall

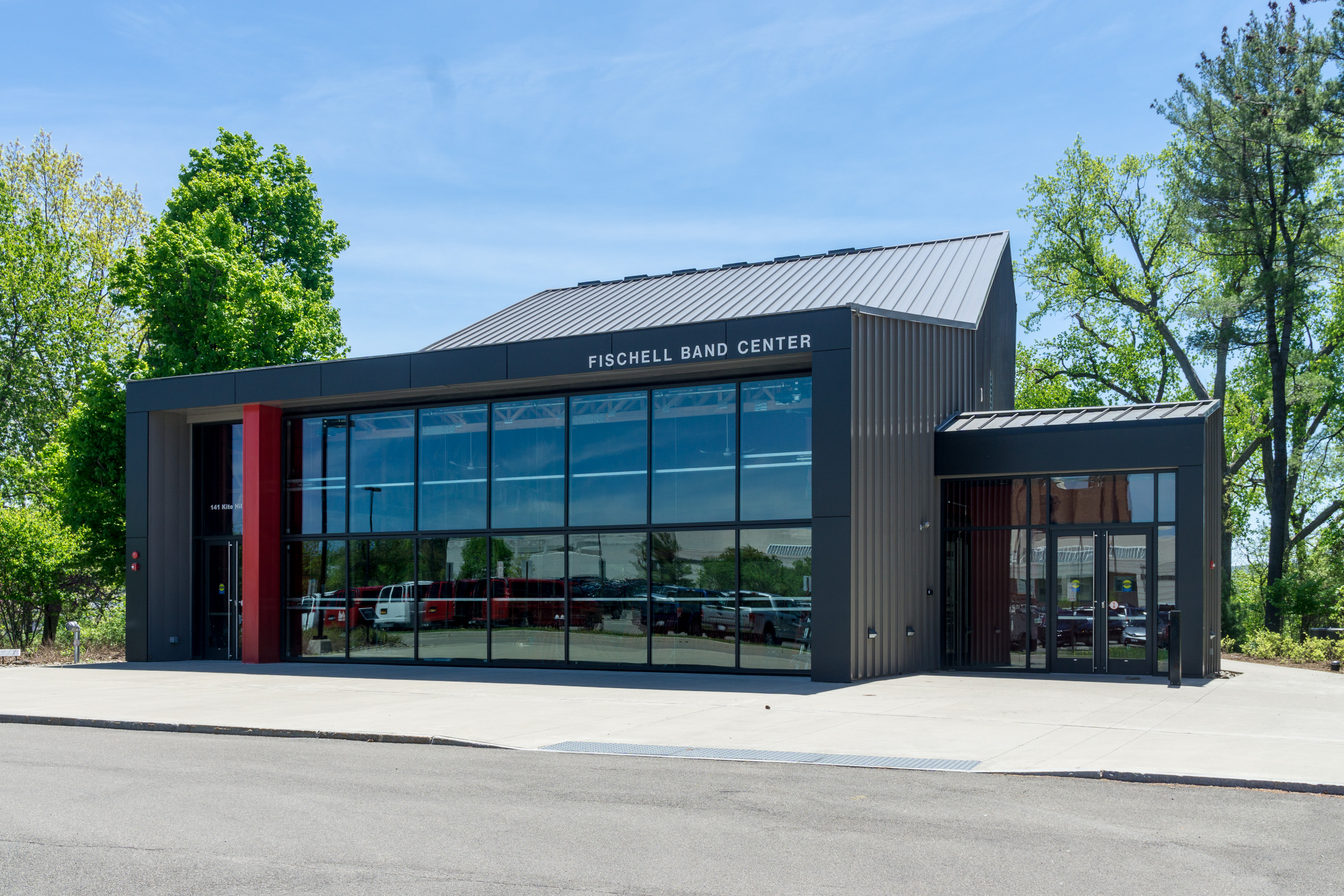
Fischell Band Center

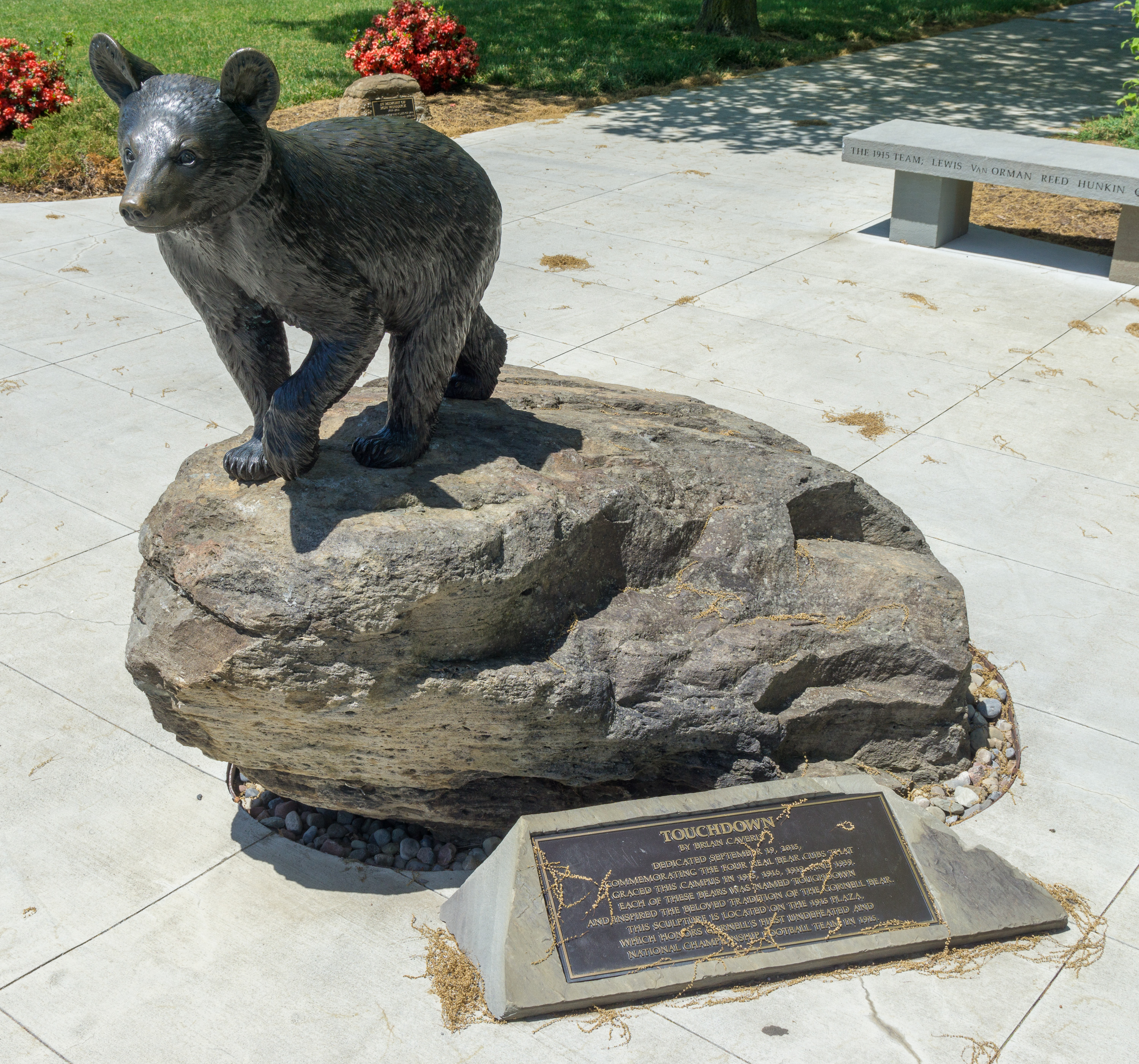
Statue of Touchdown in 1915 Plaza

An important factor in the amount of the open space on the central campus was the gift in 1902 of the alumni fields, which the Alumni leveled to provide athletic playing areas in exchange for a promise that it would remain forever open for that purpose. In 1910, the expansion of the Ag School south of Tower Road caused the Trustees and the Alumni Field Committee to agree to exchange the east end of the fields (the site of Stocking Hall) for the area which now includes Schoellkopf Field and Hoy Field.

Athletic buildings constructed in this area include: Schoellkopf Field, with Schoellkopf Memorial Hall (with a 2006 east wing), the Crescent (1914 with an expansion in 1923), and Paul Schoellkopf House for Visiting Teams), Grumman Squash Courts, Teagle Hall, Lynah Hockey Rink, Bacon Cage (since demolished) In the 1920s when Cornell's football team was national champion, the football stadium was filled to capacity with spectators. In the 1960s, the Wilson Synchrotron Laboratory was constructed in a tunnel 15 meters underneath Upper Alumni Fields. For many years, a cider track was located on Upper Alumni Fields to the east of Lynah Rink, but the 151,900 sq ft (14,110 m^{2}) Bartels Hall field house designed by Gwathmey & Siegel (1990), and the Friedman Wrestling Center (2002) were built on the site of that track. A replacement track and field complex, named for Robert J. Kane and William E. Simon was built on the east end of Upper Alumni Fields in 1996.

Just outside the Schoellkopf Crescent is the Fischell Band Center (dedicated 2013), a custom-built structure which is home to the Big Red Marching Band. The building is a three-story glass structure designed by University Architect Gilbert Delgado, with slanted walls and ceilings for superior acoustics. It also includes display cases for memorabilia, photos, and uniforms.

Outside Teagle Hall is 1915 Plaza, dedicated to the legendary football team of that year. A bronze statue of Touchdown, the unofficial Cornell mascot, stands in the plaza.

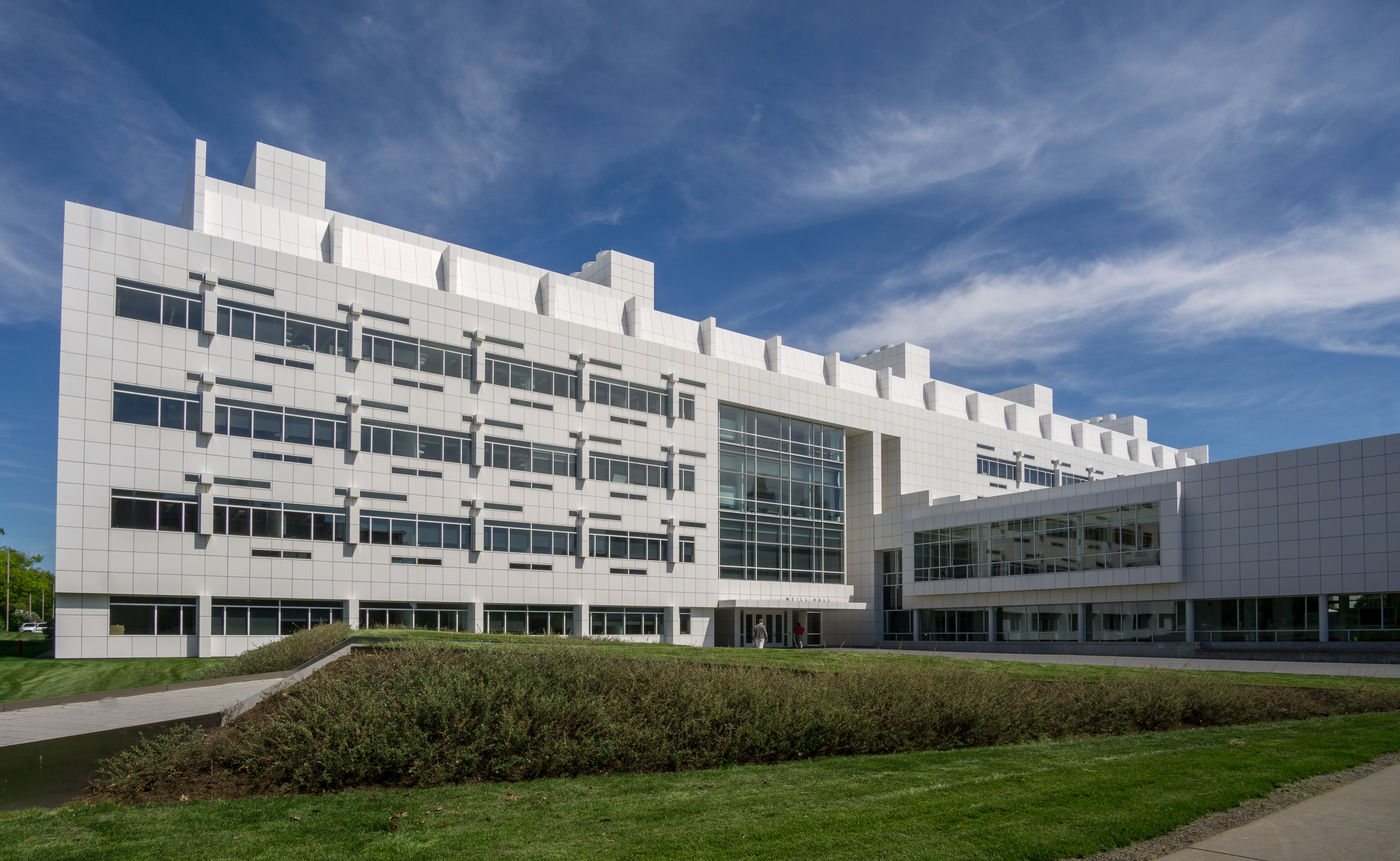
Weill Institute for Cell and Molecular Biology

In the 1970s, a new quadrangle was planned for Lower Alumni Field to house the since-dissolved Division of Biological Sciences. Three buildings were built on that playing field: the 110,380 sq ft (10,255 m^{2}) "new" Comstock Hall (1985), Seeley G. Mudd Hall – Dale R. Corson Hall (1982), and the 173,818 sq ft (16,148.2 m^{2}) Biotechnology Building (1986). In addition, Weill Institute for Cell and Molecular Biology, a $162 million Life Sciences Technology Building designed by Richard Meier was built on the west end of Upper Alumni Field in 2008. Weill Hall includes the Fuller Learning Center with extensive video conferencing equipment.

== Veterinary medicine ==
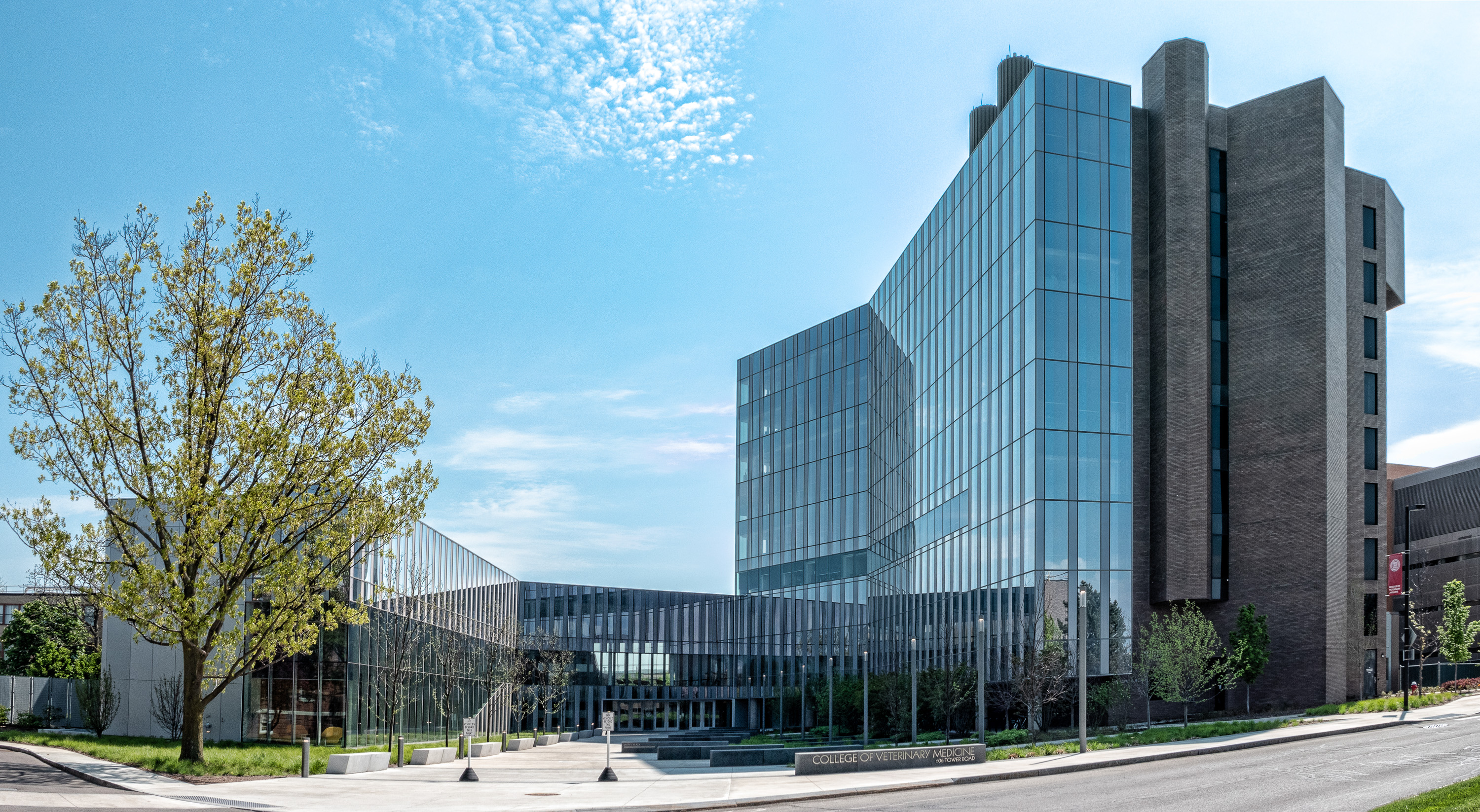
Cornell's College of Veterinary Medicine

The enabling legislation creating the college also provided funds for a veterinary building at Cornell. The building opened in the fall of 1896, and is now a portion of Ives Hall. A new veterinary complex for Cornell and the college was created in 1957 at the east end of Tower Road. The main building is named Schurman Hall. Today, this complex is the largest veterinary complex in higher education in the United States. (To compensate for the extra distance of the veterinary school from the center of the campus, a sound system was installed to amplify the chimes in Uris Library on that campus. Later, the system was extended to also play in the lobby of the Statler Inn.) In 1974, a 125,460 sq ft (11,656 m^{2}) Vet Research Tower (originally called the "Multicategorical Research Tower") was added with special central facilities to house animals for lab experiments. Its high-rise design by Ulrich Franzen balances Bradfield Hall.

In 1976, a Veterinary Diagnostic Lab was added to provide support for veterinarians throughout New York State. It was designed by Levatich, Miller & Hoffman. In 1993, a Primary Vet Teaching wing was added. In 1997, a 321,395 sq ft (29,858.6 m^{2}) Vet Hospital was added along the south side of the complex.

Adjacent to Schurman Hall is the W. C. Muenscher Poisonous Plant Garden, used by veterinary students to learn about plants poisonous to livestock. For many years, the garden included Cannabis plants.

In 1978, a new 116,854 sq ft (10,856.1 m^{2}) building designed by Ulrich Franzen was built next to the Cornell Veterinary School to house the Boyce Thompson Institute for Plant Research.

== Science buildings ==
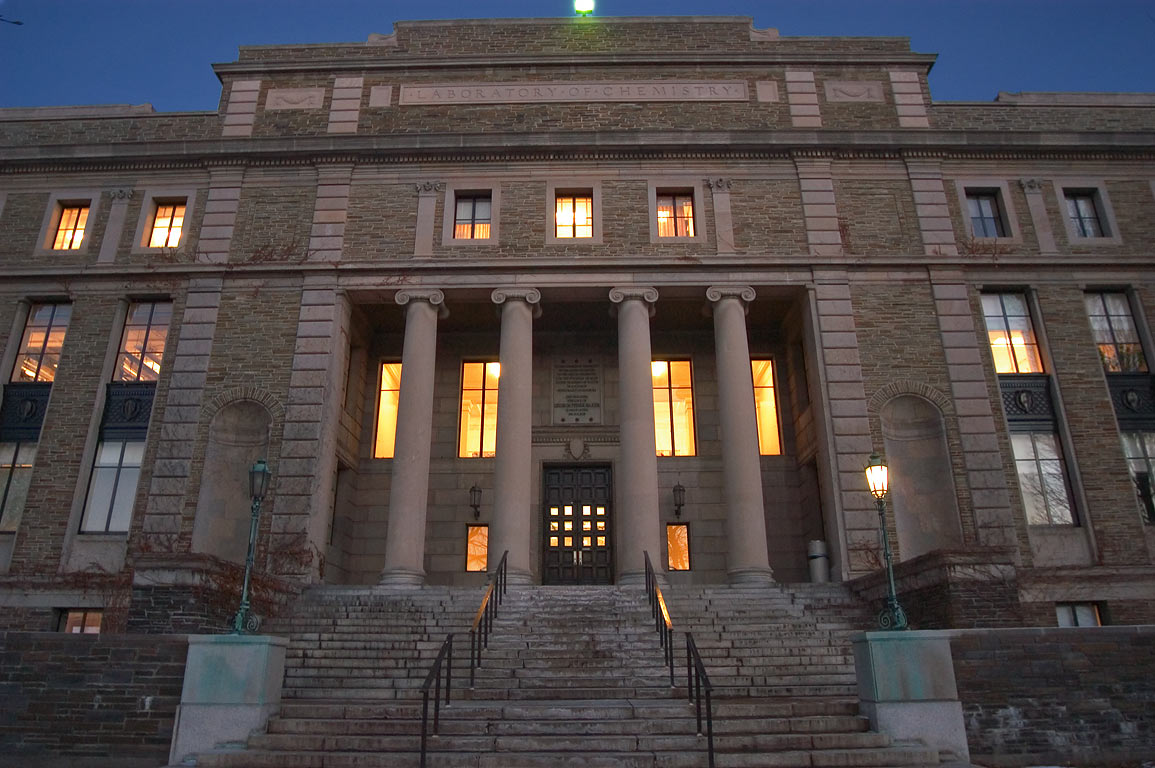
Baker Lab

The need for additional science labs caused the Arts College to expand to the east side of East Avenue, displacing faculty housing. Science buildings, in order of construction, are:

- Rockefeller Hall (1904 and 1980, physics) – red brick classroom building designed by Carrère and Hastings.
- Baker Lab (1921, chemistry) – stone building designed by Gibb & Day
- Savage Hall (1948, nutrition) – designed by Skidmore, Owings & Merrill
- Floyd R. Newman Lab (1947, physics) – contained Cornell's first particle accelerator prior to Wilson Lab.
- Clark Hall (1965, material science and physical science library) – designed by Warner, Toan & Lunde
- Spencer T. Olin Chemistry Research Lab (1967)
- Space Sciences Building (1967, astronomy)
- Kinzelberg Hall (1988, nutrition) designed by King & King.

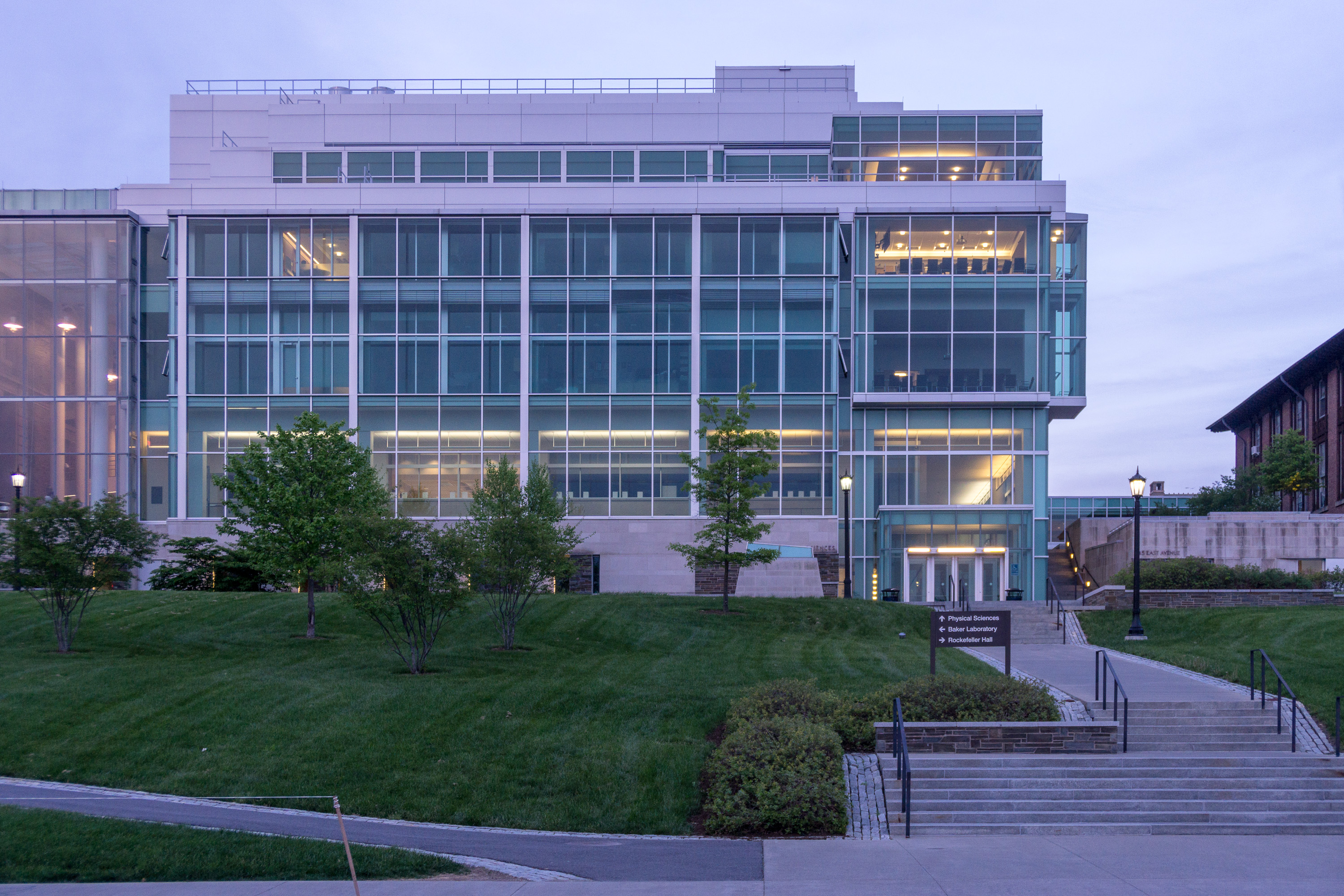
Physical Sciences building

- Physical Sciences Building (2010) - Joint project of the College of Engineering and College of Arts and Science. Houses School of Applied and Engineering Physics as well as space for the Departments of Physics and of Chemistry and Chemical Biology. Designed by Koetter, Kim & Associates.

Also located in this area are Andrew Dickson White's house, the only remaining faculty residence, now housing the Society for the Humanities, and the Big Red Barn, which was White's horse barn and which is now used as a student center for graduate students.

Malott Hall, which was built to house the Business School, now houses the Mathematics Department. Across Forest Home Drive and downhill from these buildings, are the Hydraulics Lab (1896, rebuilt 1961–62, collapsed 2009), the Weinhold Chilled Water Plant, and the Toboggan Lodge (which housed toboggan and ice skating but now serves as a University Auditors office.)

== Central buildings ==
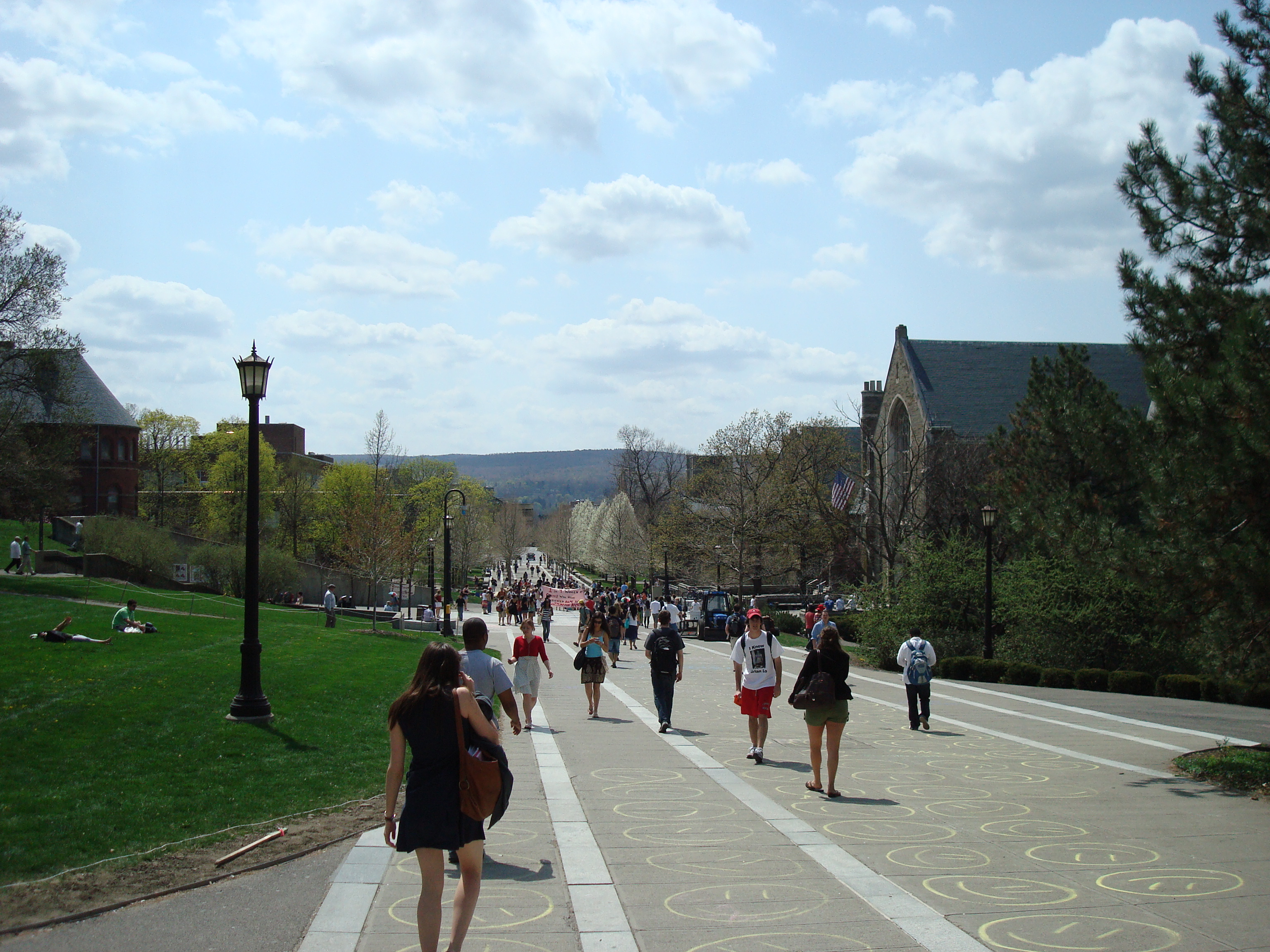
Ho Plaza, a pedestrian walk built on what used to be a stretch of Central Avenue

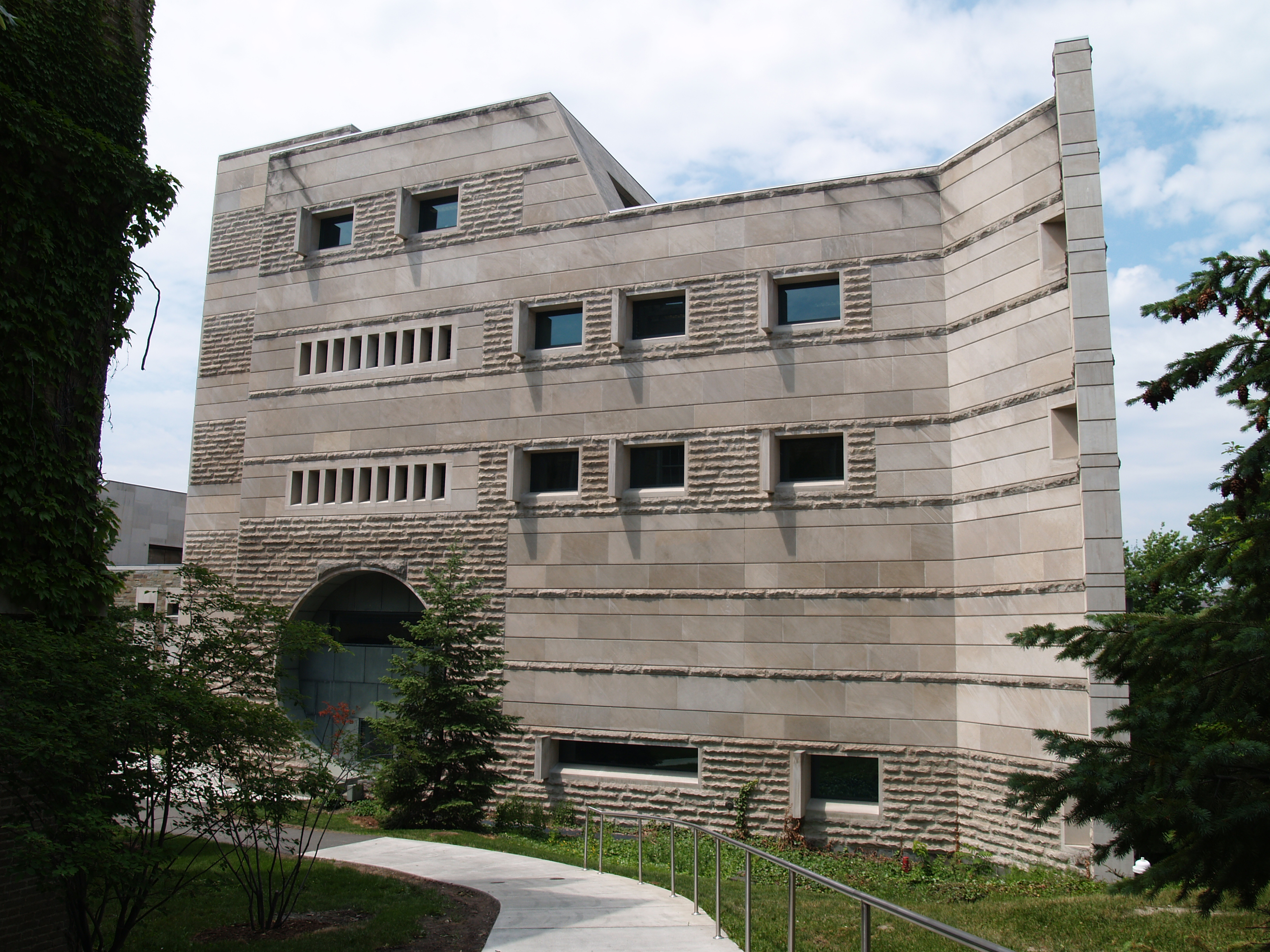
Ives Hall at the School of Industrial and Labor Relations

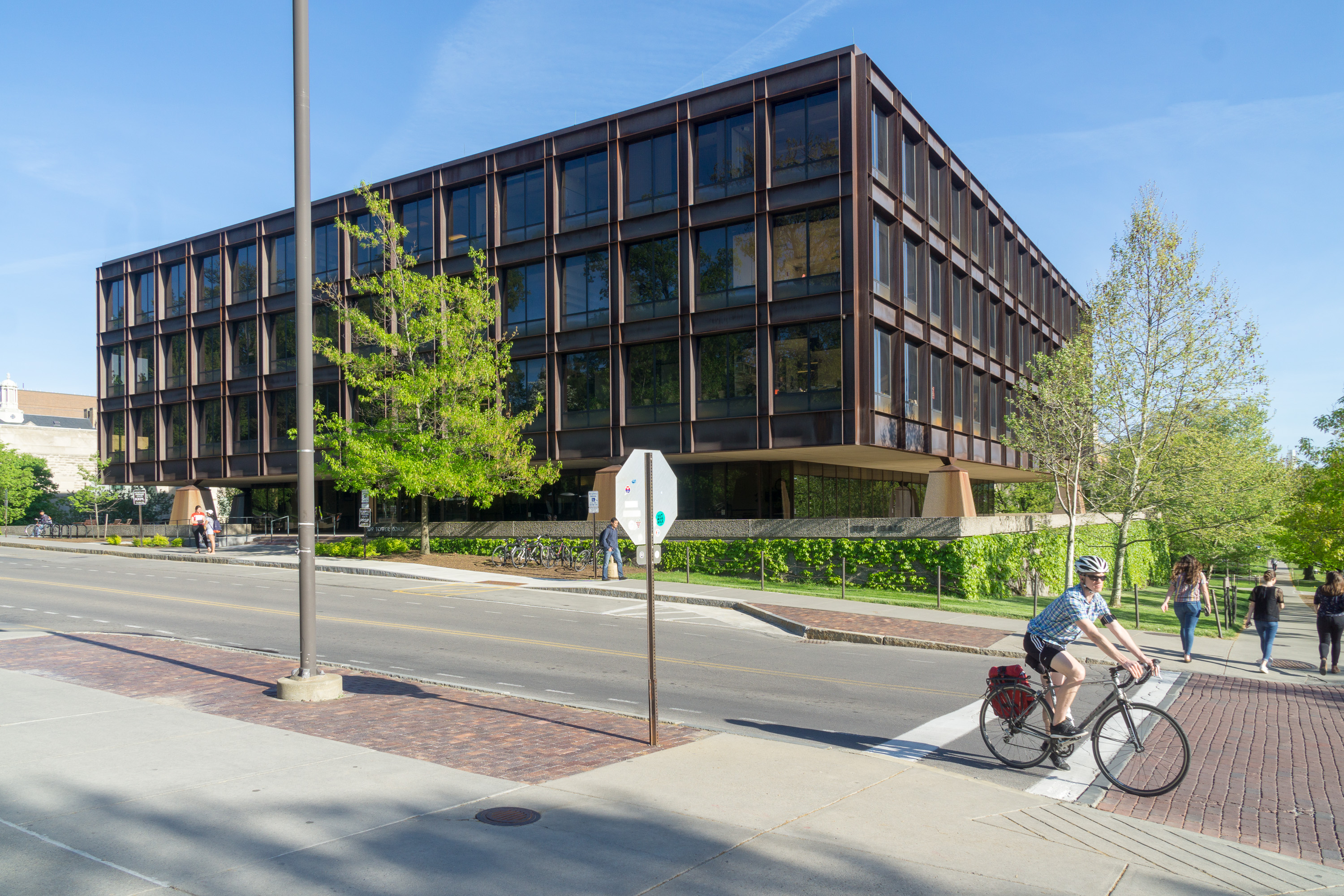
Uris Hall

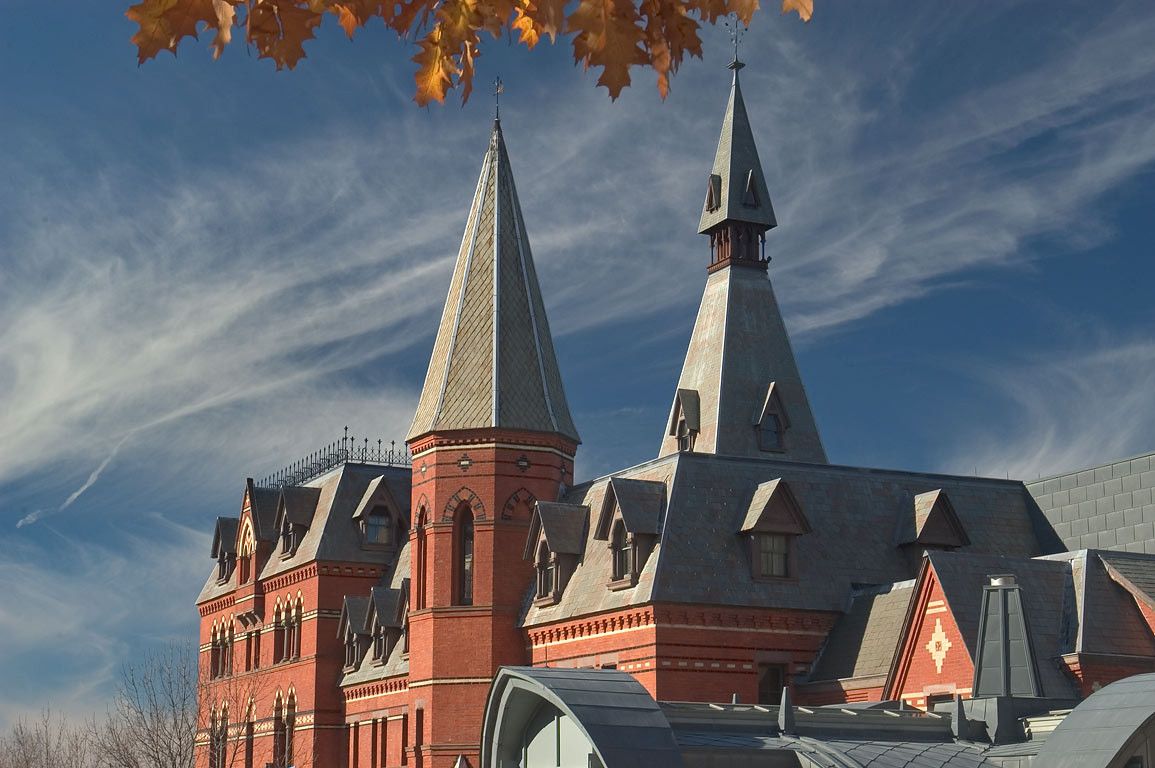
Sage Hall

The area between the Arts Quad and the Engineering Quad include a number of major buildings, including (from west to east), Willard Straight Hall (which houses Okenshields, the only dining hall on central campus), Cornell Health, Barnes Hall, the underground Cornell Campus Store designed by Earl Flansburgh, Sage Chapel, Sage Hall (which was originally a women's dormitory and is now home to the Business School), Day Hall (the administration building), corten steel-clad Uris Hall (social sciences), Statler Hall (which houses the Hotel School), Irving Ives Hall (which houses the Industrial and Labor Relations School), and Barton Hall, the armory/drill hall. The ILR extension building, located between Ives and Barton Halls, was renamed Dolgen Hall in 2008. Dolgen Hall as well as the southwest portion of Ives Hall were built to house the Veterinary School until 1957.

The open spaces in the area are enhanced by the "Wee Stinky Glen", a creek and ravine, Ho Plaza on a portion of what was Central Avenue, George Peter Plaza (between Statler and Uris Halls), the Ruth Uris Garden, the Livingston Farrand Garden, and the Mary Rockwell Azalea Garden.

On the southwest corner of Campus Road and Central Avenue are Anabel Taylor Hall (1953, home of the Cornell United Religious Works, and Myron Taylor Hall (1932, the home of the Law School). They form a harmonious quadrangle in the Collegiate Gothic style.

Across Cascadilla Gorge from the Law School, at the edge of College Town, are two major Cornell structures, historic Cascadilla Hall, now serving as an undergraduate dormitory, and the Schwartz Center for the Performing Arts. Designed by architect James Stirling (considered to be the most important British architect of the 20th century), the marble- and stucco-clad performing arts building features a loggia running alongside the gorge, from which one enters the complex. It is one of only four structures in the U.S. designed by Stirling.

== Parking and traffic ==
Historically, students lived off campus and were expected to walk to campus, and faculty housing was available on the campus, so parking was not a major issue. A trolley line from downtown crossed the campus to provide public transportation. Later, a statute gave Cornell the power to regulate parking and traffic on its campus.

The general trend has been to preserve the central campus as a pedestrian space, and parking lots have been eliminated and used as sites for new buildings. In 1969, daytime traffic across the central campus was restricted to holders of special staff parking permits. A campus bus system shuttled commuters to peripheral "A" and "B" parking lots, with the cost of the parking permits covering the operating cost of the bus system.

Subsequently, the western end of Tower Road was permanently closed to all traffic as was Central Avenue, which was developed into Ho Plaza.

However, staff continue to press for more parking on the central campus, and in response, parking structures have been built on the site of Bacon Cage on the south and on the site of the North Wing of MVR on the north. Plans to build a third garage on the Hughes Hall parking lot have been defeated. Proposals for new parking lots have generally drawn protests from neighbors as indicated by the Redbud Woods controversy in 2005.

The future of Cornell's transportation needs is currently undergoing a generic environmental impact study.

== Gorges ==
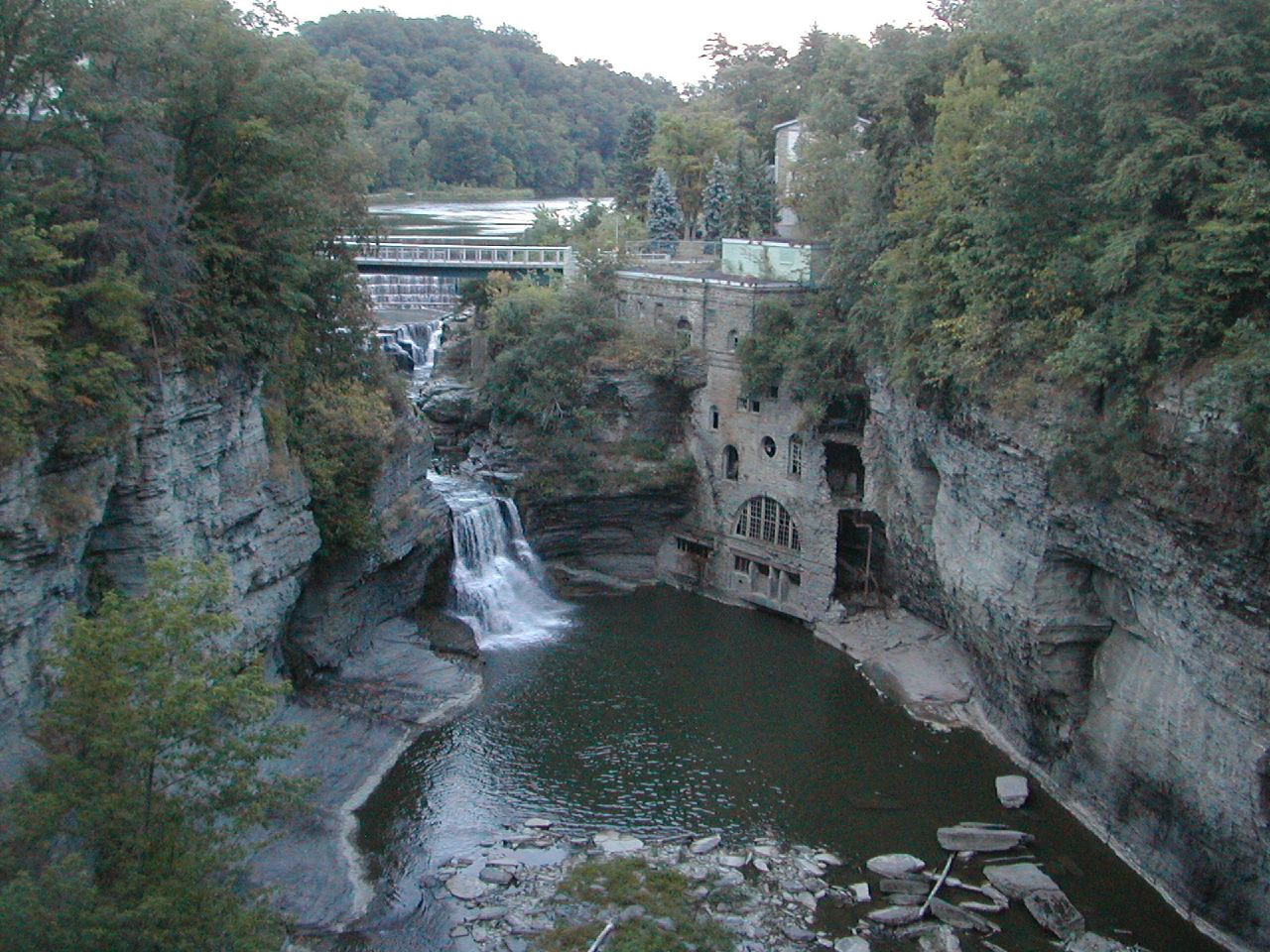
The view from Thurston Avenue Bridge of Fall Creek, Triphammer Falls, and the ruins of the Hydraulic Lab before its collapse in 2009

The central campus is flanked by two gorges: Fall Creek to the north and Cascadilla Creek to the south.

On the north, pedestrians may cross Fall Creek via the Thurston Avenue Bridge, between Rand and Risley Halls, which has a view of Triphammer Falls and Beebe Lake. Fall Creek is also crossed by the Triphammer Footbridge, directly above Triphammer Falls. Just above the falls is Beebe Dam and Beebe Lake. At the east end of Beebe Lake is the Sackett footbridge.

In October 1898, a Hydraulic Lab was built adjacent to Triphammer Falls to study water purification and water flows from the falls. A flood closed the lab in the 1960s, and the decaying building sat vacant for several decades. Finally in 2009 the building collapsed into the gorge, and not long after the structure was removed completely.

Adjacent to the Johnson Art Museum is a pedestrian suspension bridge (1960) designed by Dean S.C. Hollister and William McGuire. It replaces an earlier version constructed in 1913. Adjacent to the dam is another pedestrian bridge which was originally constructed to serve the trolley lines.

On the south, pedestrians can cross Cascadilla Gorge over the Stewart Avenue bridge, the College Avenue Bridge, a pedestrian bridge originally built for trolleys, the Eddy Dam bridge, and the Hoy Road/Dwyer Dam bridge.

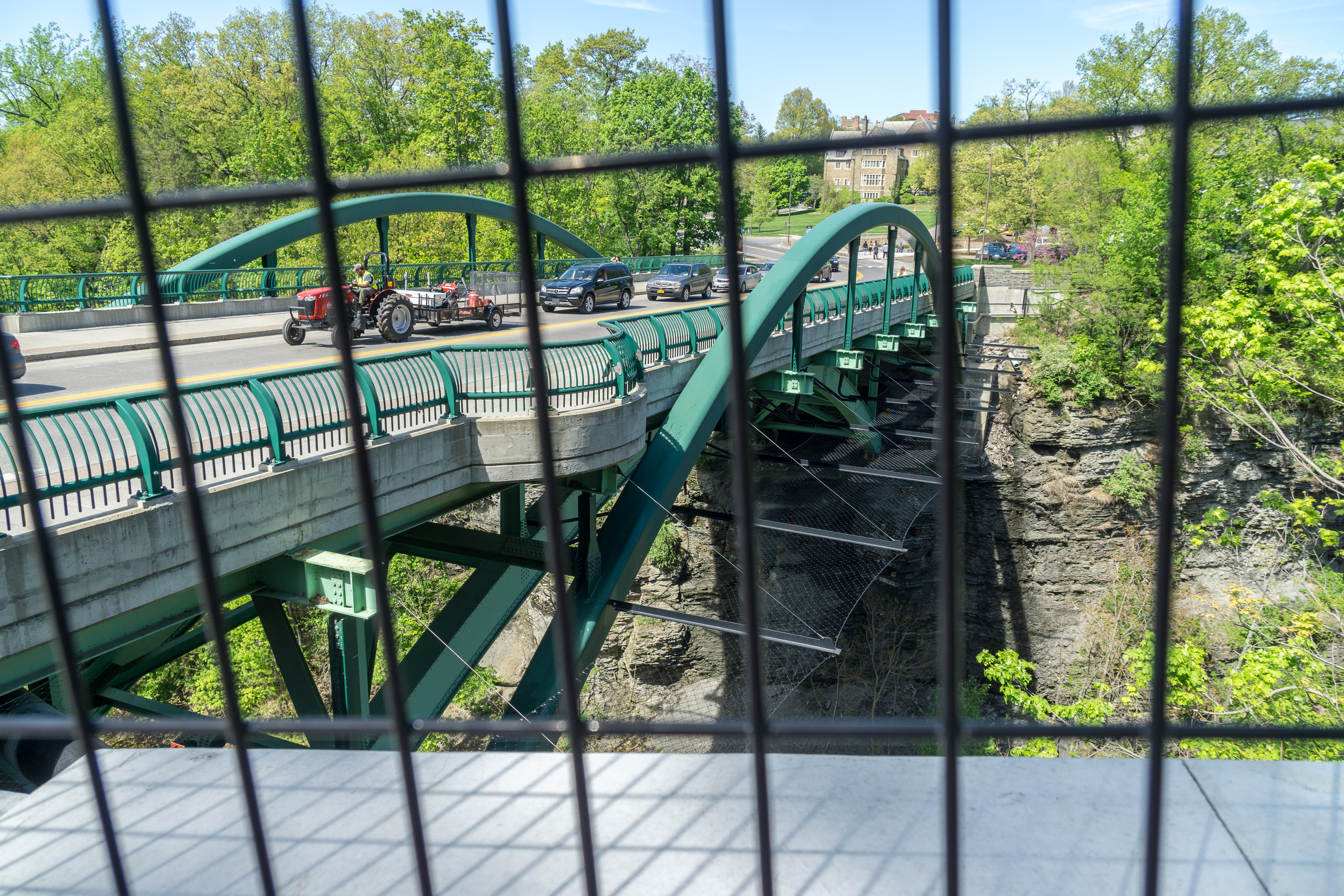
This view of the Thurston Avenue Bridge was taken through the metal fence on the southeast side of the bridge, looking north. The suicide nets are visible just below the bridge.

=== Suicide barriers ===
Following six suicides during the 2009–2010 school year, administrators erected fences along the gorge bridges, including Thurston Avenue Bridge, as a suicide deterrent. In 2012, in response to criticism that the fences were ugly, some fences were replaced with nets that couldn't be seen from the road.

== See also ==
- Cornell North Campus
- Cornell West Campus
- List of Cornell University buildings
