= Cornell Dairy =

Cornell University Dairy Cattle Teaching and Research Center or Cornell Dairy is about a 25-minute drive from Cornell University's Ithaca, New York campus and is home to over 900 milk-producing cows. The milk is used to make various signature products, including ice cream, cheese, and yogurt, which are sold on campus. The products are also served in Cornell Dining facilities for students and faculty consumption. The dairy is used as a training facility for students in both the College of Agriculture and Life Sciences and the College of Veterinary Medicine.

The Cornell Dairy Bar is located near the Agriculture Quad and sells ice cream designed by undergraduate students. Flavors include the common strawberry, vanilla, and chocolate, and the more esoteric Dean's Berry Swirl, Clocktower Pumpkin and Banana Berry Skorton. The Dairy Bar temporarily closed on June 18, 2010 to undergo renovations as part of a larger remodeling project of Stocking Hall. A newly remodeled Bar reopened Fall 2013. In May 2017, to celebrate Cornell University's commencement speaker, former Vice President Joe Biden, the Dairy Bar created and sold the flavor "Big Red, White, and Biden."

The Cornell University Department of Food Science operates the Cornell Dairy, which manufactures such items as ice cream, milk, and yogurt. These products are provided to the network of Dining Units throughout campus and also are sold in Stocking Hall on the main campus, at the Dairy Bar. The 800+ cows that are the source of the milk for the Cornell Dairy, are located some 20 minutes away. The Cornell University Department of Animal Science operates the farm.
