= Rice Hall (Ithaca, New York) =

Building at Cornell University

- U.S. National Register of Historic Places
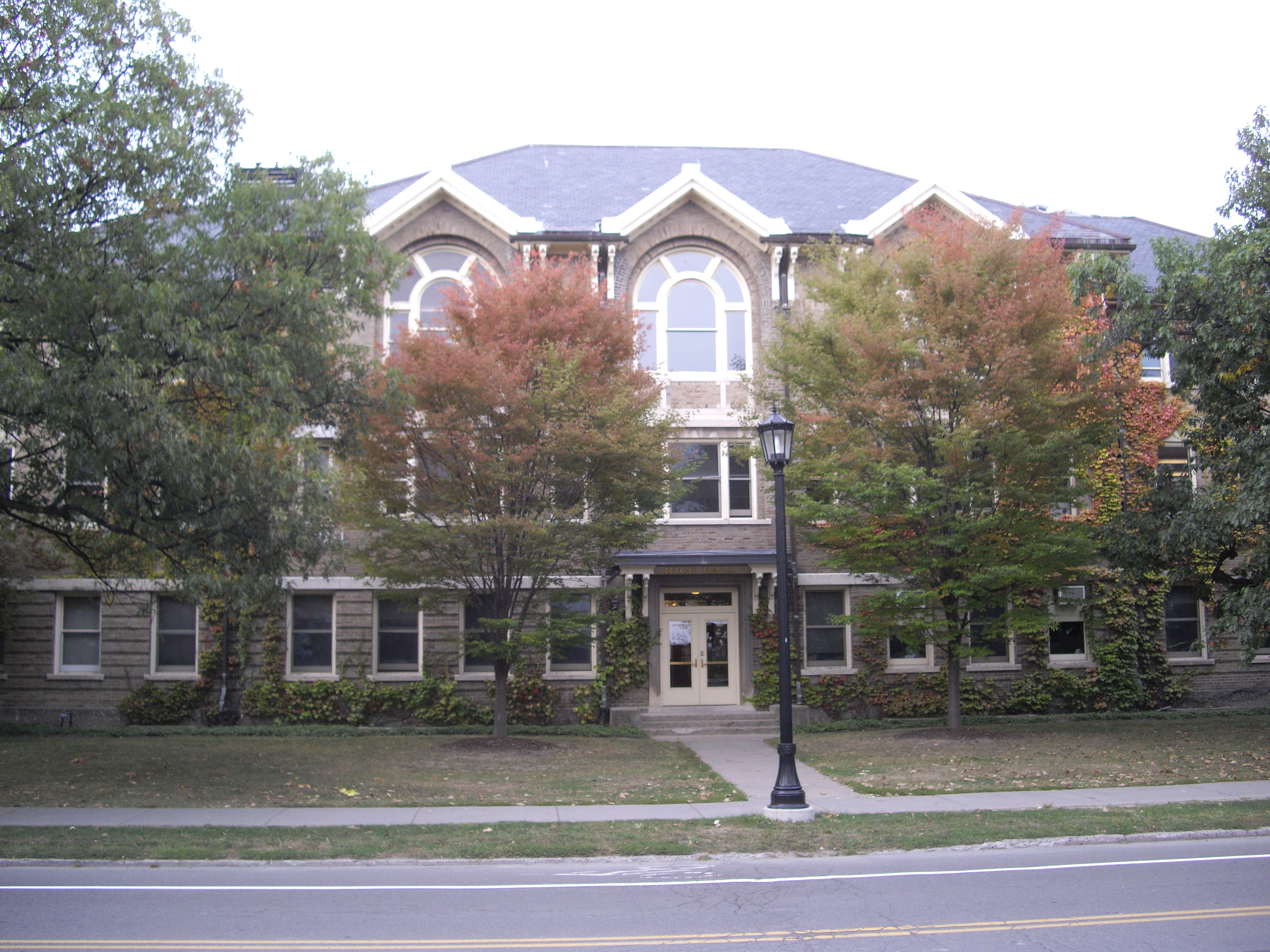

- Location within New York Location within the United States
- Location: Ithaca, New York
- Coordinates: 42°26′53.18″N 76°28′27.82″W
- Built: 1911
- Architect: Multiple
- Architectural style: Renaissance
- MPS: New York State College of Agriculture TR
- NRHP reference No.: 84003190
- Added to NRHP: September 24, 1984

Rice Hall is a building on the Cornell University campus that was listed on the National Register of Historic Places in 1984.

It is a three-story rectangular building. Its first floor is built with rusticated brick imitating clapboards, and has coursed brickwork above. It has a slate roof.

Its basement provides storage to the Cornell Computer Reuse Association (CCRA), a registered Cornell student organization whose mission is to donate computers and other computer-related technology to humanitarian organizations in the developing world, the local Ithaca community, and elsewhere.

Its eligibility for LEED certification is under review.
