= Computing and Communications Center, Cornell University =

- Comstock Hall
- U.S. National Register of Historic Places
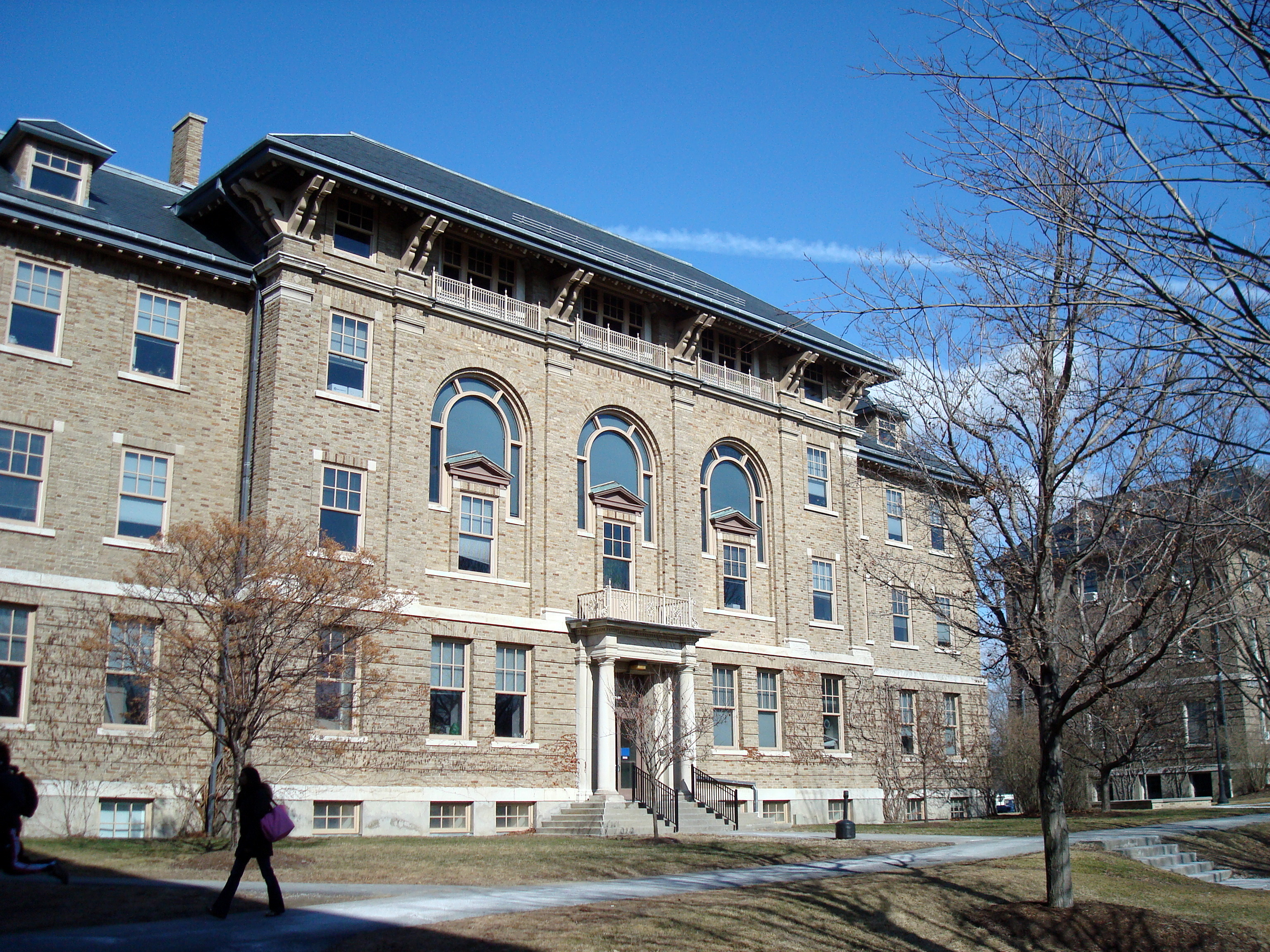
- The building in February 2009

- Location within New York Location within the United States
- Location: 235 Garden Ave., Ithaca, New York
- Coordinates: 42.4493°N 76.4790°W
- Area: 60,100 sq ft
- Built: 1911
- Architectural style: Renaissance Revival
- MPS: New York State College of Agriculture TR
- NRHP reference No.: 84003122
- Added to NRHP: September 24, 1984

The Computing and Communications Center is a building of Cornell University, located in Ithaca, New York. It was built in 1911 and listed on the National Register of Historic Places in 1984. It was designed by Green and Wicks with the collaboration of Clarence Augustine Martin, the Dean of the Architecture School at Cornell.

Originally built by New York State for the Home Economics program, the building was renamed Comstock Hall in 1934 when the Entomology Department relocated there. In the 1980s, it was sold to Cornell so that mainframe computers could be relocated from Langmuir Laboratory. As a result, a new, state-funded Entomology Department building was named Comstock Hall in 1985, and the historic building was given its present name. The building was named in honor of John Henry Comstock and Anna Botsford Comstock.
