= George Peter (technician) =

- Born: October 21, 1922; Ithaca, New York
- Died: August 10, 2008 (aged 85)
- Education: Ithaca High School
- Occupations: Technician, businessman, trustee, writer
- Employer(s): United States Army Air Corps; Arecibo Observatory; Cornell University
- Known for: Employee rights activism at Cornell University

George Peter (October 21, 1922 – August 10, 2008) was an activist for employee rights at Cornell University.

== Biography ==
Peter was born in 1922 in Ithaca, New York. His father was an Armenian immigrant, who had a farm near the town and worked in a quarry that was the source of the stone used to construct Myron Taylor Hall. Peter graduated from Ithaca High School in 1940 and then enlisted in the United States Army Air Corps. In 1947 Peter gave up a job which paid $4,400 annually for a post as an electriconics technician at Cornell that paid only $2,200. In 1960, he moved to Arecibo, Puerto Rico to help build the world's largest radio telescope. He returned to New York State two years later to lead the Research and Development Laboratory of the National Astronomy and Ionosphere Center, and lived in Aurora, New York. His work involved specialized, low-noise radio astronomy receiver and antenna systems.

In the aftermath of the black student takeover of Willard Straight Hall, Cornell revamped its governance, including adding student and faculty representatives to its board of trustees and creating a student-faculty-employee University Senate. Peter won election to the first Senate in 1970 and immediately began lobbying to establish an employee trustee position. When the state legislature created that seat in 1975, Peter won election to the position and served five terms. Peter also served as an employee representative on the Senate's executive committee and chaired other committees. He also served on the Trustee Executive Committee. He also started a page devoted to employee concerns in the Cornell Chronicle as well as other Cornell employee publications. Peter wrote a column called "Leadership Leads" and a collection of his columns was subsequently published as a book. Peter served as employee representative on two Presidential search committees. Outside his Cornell employment, Peter owned a TV and appliance sales and service business from 1952 to 1960 and from 1962 to 1968.

Peter was active as a Freemason and gained rapport with other trustees who were also masons. Peter served as Master of two local lodges as well as Grand Historian for the Grand Lodge of the State of New York. He co-founded a series of leadership courses for New York masons.

After Peter retired from Cornell in 1988, Peter was active in the Cornell Retirees Association. Cornell elected Peter trustee emeritus in 1990. Peter then became active in the Morgan Opera House in Aurora, New York. He was co-founder of the Cornell Recreation Club.

== Honors ==
In 1989, the outdoor plaza between Uris Hall and the Statler Hotel is named in his honor. The university named its "The George Peter Award for Dedicated Service" in his honor.
