= Howard W. Riley =

American engineer (1879–1971)

Howard W. Riley (2 May 1879 – 15 August 1971) was the first head of what is now the Cornell University Department of Biological and Environmental Engineering, appointed in 1907. He served as head of the department until his retirement in 1944. Riley-Robb Hall, where the department now resides, is named after him.
