= All Sports Competition (Cornell University) =

Collegiate intramural program

The All Sports Championship is a collegiate intramural program at Cornell University culminating in the awarding of the All Sports Trophy. The competition is refereed over a series of sports competitions through the Fall and Spring Term. Each sports' competition ends in the awarding of a University Championship and points toward the All Sports Trophy.

== Standard of Play ==
The prize was originally called the Class of 1897 All-Round Athletic Championship Trophy. Competition has ebbed and flowed over the generations, but has always been open to all. In 1930, the Chinese Students' Club took the trophy. Reaching a peak of competition in the 1950s, Beta Theta Pi took the Trophy twice in succession, joining only two other fraternities doing so since 1927, Alpha Chi Rho and Pi Kappa Alpha. Two other Cornell fraternities had won the Trophy three times, though not in succession, Phi Kappa Sigma and Pi Kappa Alpha. In the first 25 years of the competition, the Trophy moved between a high number of competitors. Alpha Chi Rho's beginnings of dynasty was interrupted by the Second World War. The first long run of victories came after the war, as veterans returning from the European and Pacific theatres brought Beta Theta Pi the championship four years in a row. The Betamen returned to the Champion's dais in 1960, after a heated three-way competition in 1959 in which Phi Kappa Psi played the spoiler, sapping points and placing Sigma Phi Epsilon in the lead position. For the next 25 years, a sports oligarchy passed the Trophy between 15 Houses. Chi Psi dominated the competition at the beginning of the 1980s, a decade which dissolved into a three-way competition between Chi Psi, Sigma Nu and Phi Kappa Psi. Following the Millennium, Sigma Alpha Epsilon returned with a run of five victories, 2000–2004, with a sixth victory in 2006 and a seventh in 2010. Sigma Alpha Epsilon was also in the lead for the Trophy in 2011, but its recognition was rescinded by the university following the death of a brother. The standard of play, at times, has been high. Notably, the presence for veterans studying under the G.I. Bill swelled the ranks of All Sports boxing competitors. Juniors and seniors were exempt from the university's Physical Education requirement during these years, and boxing in the Old Armory soon overshadowed the physical education classes. Intramural boxing flourished as it had never done so before, or since. Tournaments in the Old Armory or Barton Hall would attract fifty of sixty competitors between 1946 and 1953.

== Development of the Modern Cornell Intramural Program ==
Twenty years after Cornell University opened its doors in 1868, the concept of intramural sports had entered university operations but was not developed extensively. No general facilities existed for Cornell students not competing within the intercollegiate program. Traditionally, Cornell's Department of Physical Education would become the advocate for intramurals and a private organization—the Cornell Athletic Association—would advance intercollegiate competition. By 1934, the two organizations with conflicting priorities would exhibit intermittent hostility toward one another.

While some recreation was present at Cornell from its early years in the form of canoeing and gorge hiking, the advent of formal intramurals only began in 1905 when Charles Van Patten "Tar" Young arrived to serve as assistant coach of the varsity football team. Inter-class games had been scheduled and played over the previous generation. The Cornell fraternities also established, for instance, their own baseball league in the 1890s. President Jacob Gould Schurman made individual physical fitness a priority after the turn of the century. The Cornell alumni responded with funds to create the fifty-acre Alumni Fields, upper and lower for intramural play. By 1911, Schurman reported that 75% of Cornell men were participating in regular exercise. "Tar" became a forceful advocate for individual-based athletics as a recreation, a break from scholarly studies. He pushed golf, tennis, swimming, skiing, canoeing, and horseshoes. His influence helped provide facilities for those sports at Cornell. Young, who graduated in 1899 as one of Cornell's greatest athletes, maintained a deep interest in intercollegiate and intramural athletics until his death in 1960. He mustered as varsity football's quarterback on the gridiron, and pitched for the Diamondmen. He played major league baseball for one year as a pitcher with the Philadelphia Athletics.

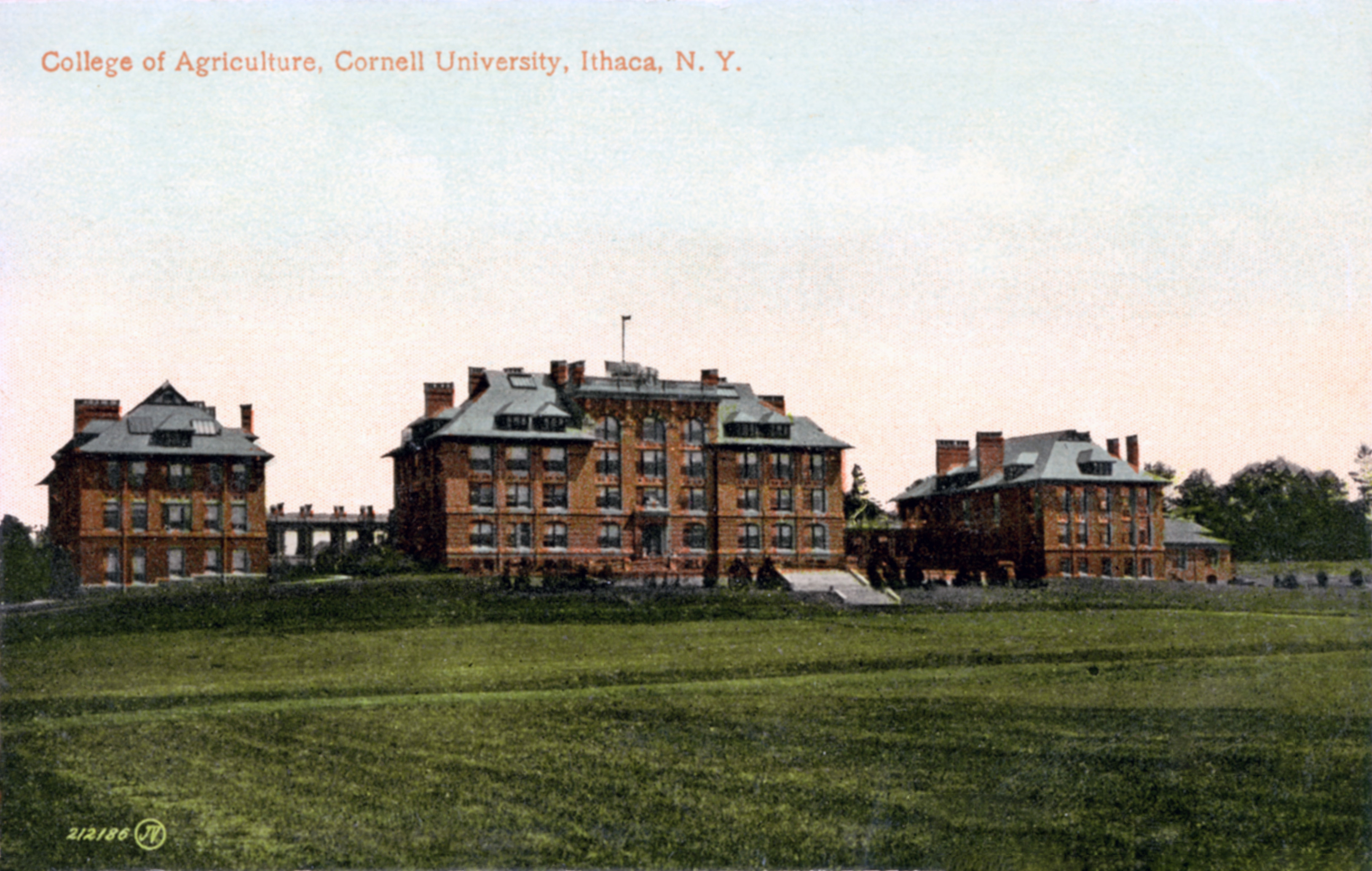
Lower Alumni fields, in foreground, were donated for the use of Cornell students playing intramurals. Now the site of the life sciences complex.

"Tar" Young was instrumental in raising money and creating Upper and Lower Alumni Fields as a permanent home for Cornell intramurals (though they are now home to the life sciences facilities and varsity practice fields), the Balch Hall athletic fields for women (which are gone, used to build Cornell North Campus), and the ski slope named in his honor in the Caroline Hills eleven miles east of Ithaca (now abandoned). He had much to do with the construction of the old intramural boathouse on the west shore of the Inlet (which also has been let go). The Outing Club he founded has modern successors. The Mount Pleasant Lodge was also built under his auspices but was not replaced after it fell into decay in the 1960s and burned down in 1968. For many years he maintained his office in the Old Armory (now the site of Carpenter Hall) and conducted roller skating sessions in the gymnasium. By 1929 and the issuing of the Carnegie Foundation's inquiry into college athletics, the Cornell intramural sports program was singled out as 'exceptional' along with ten other university programs.

The collapse of Cornell's intercollegiate athletics program in the 1930s led to campus-wide introspection regarding the heights fallen from since the early 1920s. Sensing opportunities were broader than the Cornell alumni-led discussion was offering, Cornell President Livingston Farrand requested that Professor Frederick G. Marcham draw up a plan for a rejuvenation of both the intercollegiate and intramural athletic system at Cornell. Marcham had chaired the faculty committee reviewing athletics, and had placed intramurals at the forefront of the debate. He sought to raise their prominence. Aiding the university with athletics in general were professors C.V.P. Young, physical education, and Hermann Diederichs, engineering. The Marcham Committee included professors Horace Whiteside, law and a former football player of renown at Michigan; H.E. Baxter, architecture; and Marcham. The report was critical of the existing program and graduate manager Romeyn Berry in particular. After Farrand read the report, he asked for a plan from Marcham. Significantly, the plan detailed the extensive need for facilities, but intramural rather than intercollegiate.

The resulting Trustee decisions led to the creation, for the first time, of athletic facilities for the Cornell students in general and not as an afterthought when building facilities for the intercollegiate teams. Howard B. Ortner, class of 1919, was placed in charge of intramurals. Walter C. Teagle offered $1.5 million in 1939 to build what would become Teagle Hall. Unfortunately, members of the Cornell faculty interceded to divert the money to academic facilities. The hall would be erected, but it would take fifteen more years.

A comprehensive intramural plan was adopted and Coach Nicholas Bawlf was appointed supervisor of intramural sports. Every new student was required to fill out a questionnaire indicating their athletic preference. This initiative produced the largest collegiate intramural program in the country. Cornell mustered about 6,000 students in 1937, including 2,500 who were not members of Cornell's sixty fraternities. This movement peaked with a report to the Cornell Board of Trustees noting that University policy, with respect to intramurals, was that "intramural sports and physical education and recreation are a pleasant way to good health and that good health is a vital factor in personal happiness and success." In approving the report, the Board noted that "[i]t is not too much to say that if the program described above were carried out, the recreational and social life of Cornell University would be revolutionized. More individual students would acquire the habit of taking part in recreation, more class, fraternity and residential hall teams and leagues would be created, and coeducational recreation would establish itself. Within the limits of the University Campus the whole student body would find vital new centers of interest and activity. The Cornell intramural program was seen as a means of transforming undergraduate life.

The Cornell intramural program following 1927 was exceptional. Professor C.V.P. Young and coach Nick Bawlf, soccer and hockey, provided leadership. As Professor Morris Bishop, romance languages, described the system:

The play spirit reigned. Fraternities, clubs, informal groupings of all sorts, struggled, however inexpertly, in a dozen sports. One could no longer assert that college sports were for the few, while the many sat semisupine in the stands. The complaint was rather that the student body was exercising itself instead of sitting semisupine in the stands. In 1927, the coaches were incensed to discover many freshmen were signing up for club and intramural teams, and all too few for freshman football, track and crew.

The resulting system was so successful, it engendered backlash from the Cornell intercollegiate establishment. Coach John F. Moakley stated that, "[f]raternities take this intramural competition so seriously that irrespective of the fact that a student may possess ability to win a major letter, they use him in these intramural competitions. To win points in collegiate track competition, one cannot take time off from track for these house competitions and be of service to track that he is capable of. Alumni should advise their freshmen friends who have distinguished themselves at school in track to stick to this sport if they hope to make a freshman or a varsity team. Intramural athletics should be for the boy who doesn't exercise and not the experienced athlete. The latter is needed to represent Cornell in intercollegiate competition."

In 1927–28, for instance, an astounding 3,945 students were engaged in intramural sports such as soccer, touch football, basketball, tennis, hockey, and softball. With only the Old Armory to serve as a court, intramural basketball alone mustered 600 students – which was about 10% of the students at Cornell – playing on 59 teams spread across 12 leagues. Play was diverse. The university championship in soccer came down to a play-off between the Chinese Students' Association and the Cosmopolitan Club. Even religious clubs sported teams, including Hillel, the Cardinal Newman Club, and Methodist and Baptist organizations. Buses took skiers to the Caroline hills for competition. Ten years later, there were 24 golf teams, 34 four-oared crews, 79 softball teams, a handball league and a horseshoe pitching league. By 1933, the university champion of the Cornell intramural football season was playing the same from Colgate University in a Central New York championship game at Schoellkopf Stadium.

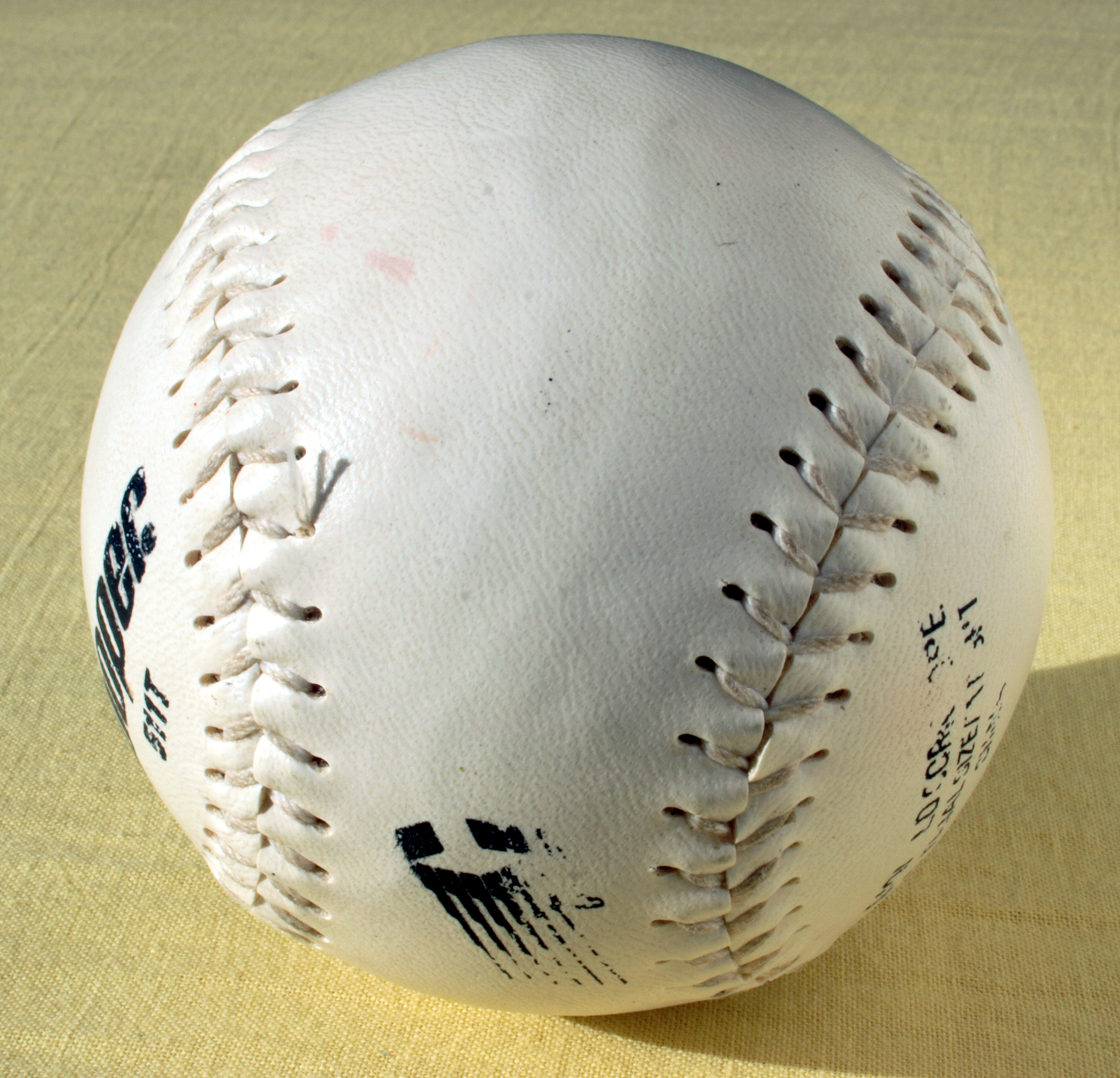
Softball is one of the Cornell All Sports competitions.

== The Second World War ==
Following the mobilization of American men of college age for wartime service, many undergraduate traditions were put on hold for the duration of the war's disruption, 1942 to 1947. The All Sports Competition was not held during these years. But Cornell's intramural program did continue in a different form. It now became part of the military and naval training required of Cornell men, undergraduate and V-12 (the U.S. Navy's officer development program). The Cornell faculty committed the university to compulsory physical training for all students and permitted certain sports as a means of meeting the requirement. The naval and military commands had different approaches to the training of their respective Cornell students. The U.S. Navy brought a large contingent of instructors to Ithaca for its upperclassmen and graduate officer candidates. The Army was training a large number of immature draftees preparing for miscellaneous assignments at war. Physical training was left to the university's Physical Education Department staffed by Cornell faculty performing collateral duties as coaches and instructors. Cornell's future football coach, George K. James was placed in charge of this program. Following the Second World War, the tension between Cornell intercollegiate and intramural educational policies continued. Cornell faculty opposition to Teagle Hall subsided after the war. When the hall was proposed in the 1930s, it was designed to accommodate the needs of intramural physical education. When it was built, it was designed to meet the needs of Cornell's intercollegiate teams.

== Post-war Developments ==
Cornell returned to intramurals following the Second World War. During 1946–47, 5,716 Cornell men competed in 893 scheduled contests across nine sports. Skiing, wrestling, table tennis and billiards were scheduled for tournaments for the first time. Cornell's fraternities fielded 52 basketball teams in one league; 64 independent groups were also in competition. Softball drew record numbers. Major alumni fundraising efforts on behalf of Cornell athletics continue to use both intercollegiate and intramural competition as the basis for soliciting funds.

== Historic Structure, 1950s ==
The All Sports Championship originated in 1927 the product of a movement at Cornell University to make the university more inclusive of men who chose not to join fraternities. Creating two leagues, one for independents and one for fraternity men, the All Sports Trophy was awarded annually to the team winning a play-off championship between the two leagues. After the Second World War, competition was played in thirteen sports. Scoring for the trophy was computed on the final standings in each of the sports. The thirteen sports were sub-divided into three divisions based on the type of play and whether the sport involved team or individual competition. Each division carried a different weight in the scoring, the more team effort required, the more the score was weighted.

- Category I sports were leading team sports. Winning this category garnered thirteen points toward the All Sports Trophy. Second place in Category I won ten points. The third and fourth placed teams took seven and four points, respectively. This category included touch-football (Fall), basketball (Winter), volleyball (Winter), and softball (Spring).
- Category II sports were the leading individual sports competing as teams, such as bowling, cross country, swimming, track and field, and wrestling. The points were awarded to the team, with first place garnering ten points, second place taking six points, and third, fourth and fifth place taking four, two and one points respectively.
- Category III included sports where outstanding play by one individual could tip the Trophy to his organization. Accordingly, the point structure minimized this winner-take-all possibility. Also included in Category III were sports in which a small number of players could carry the day. Sports in this category included badminton, boxing, horseshoes and skiing. A Category III champion received six points, second place took away four points, third and fourth place received two and one points, respectively.

The current point allegation system for the Cornell All Sports competition is based on this structure from the 1950s, though new sports have been added over the years.

== Organizational Skill Tested ==
The All Sports Trophy was the zenith of the old Cornell 'compet' system, developed in the 1880s and holding sway in Cornell life for a little over a century. Extra-curricular activities were designed to pit Cornell student against Cornell student, ever-sharpening the developing student's abilities to compete in a larger marketplace after Commencement. The Cornell intramural system tested stamina in small group behavior and organizational development through a points-bias toward successive turnouts in sport-after-sport, biasing the system to larger group dynamics and complex organization. As such, exceptional athletic ability was oftentimes a subordinate strength to the ability of an organization to plan, execute, and refine an overall competition strategy.

== Past Champions ==
Year	Fraternity
2020	Sigma Alpha Mu
2019	Sigma Alpha Mu
2018	Pi Kappa Alpha
2017	Sigma Pi
2016	Pi Kappa Alpha
2015	Kappa Sigma
2014	Delta Upsilon
2013	Delta Upsilon
2012	Sigma Pi
2011	Tau Epsilon Phi
2010	Sigma Alpha Epsilon
2009	Delta Chi
2008	Delta Chi
2007	Delta Upsilon
2006	Sigma Alpha Epsilon
2005	Sigma Pi
2004	Sigma Alpha Epsilon
2003	Sigma Alpha Epsilon
2002	Sigma Alpha Epsilon
2001	Sigma Alpha Epsilon
2000	Sigma Alpha Epsilon

== See also ==
- Physical education class
- Team sport
