= Balch Hall =

All-female residence hall at Cornell University

Coordinates: 42°27′12.02″N 76°28′46.87″W

Balch Hall
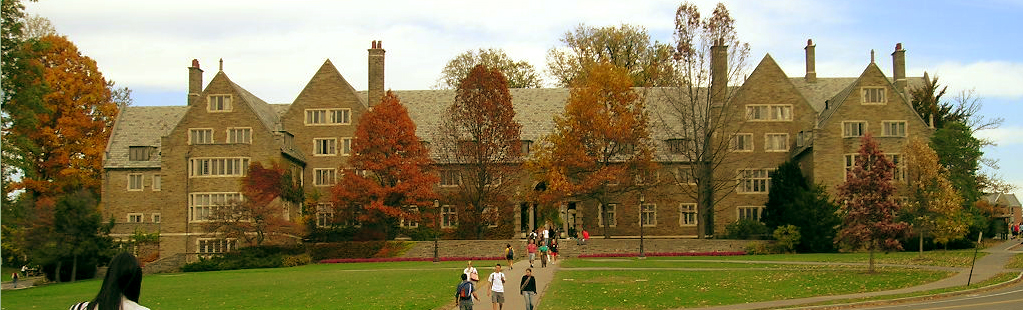

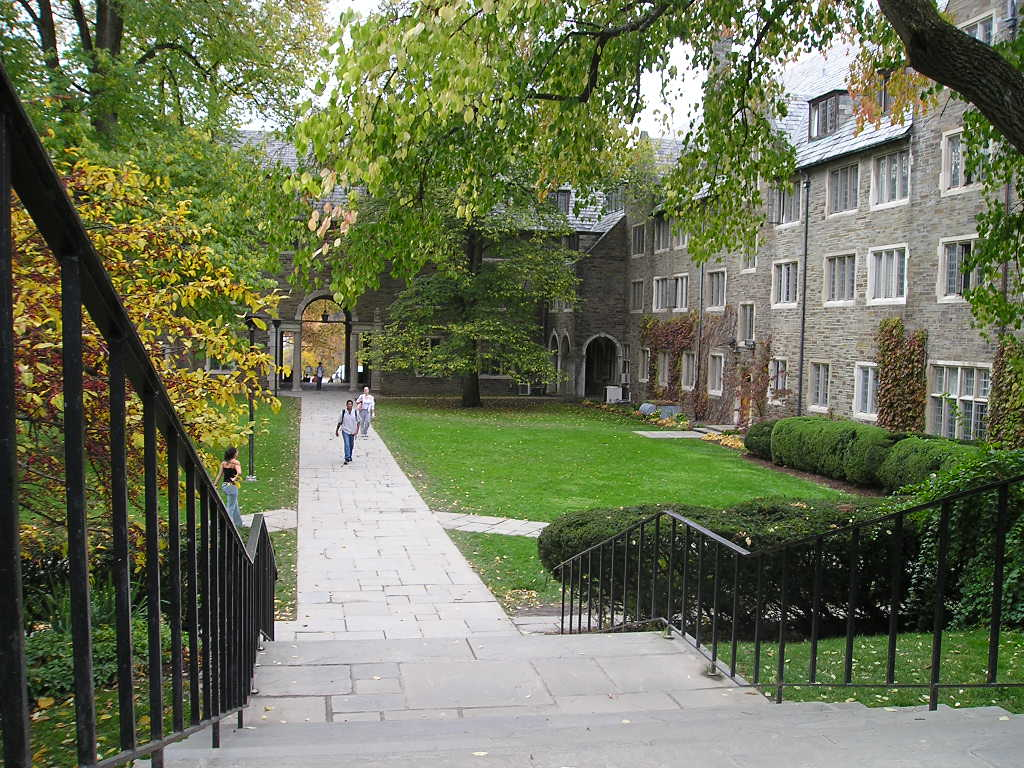
Stairway in Balch Courtyard

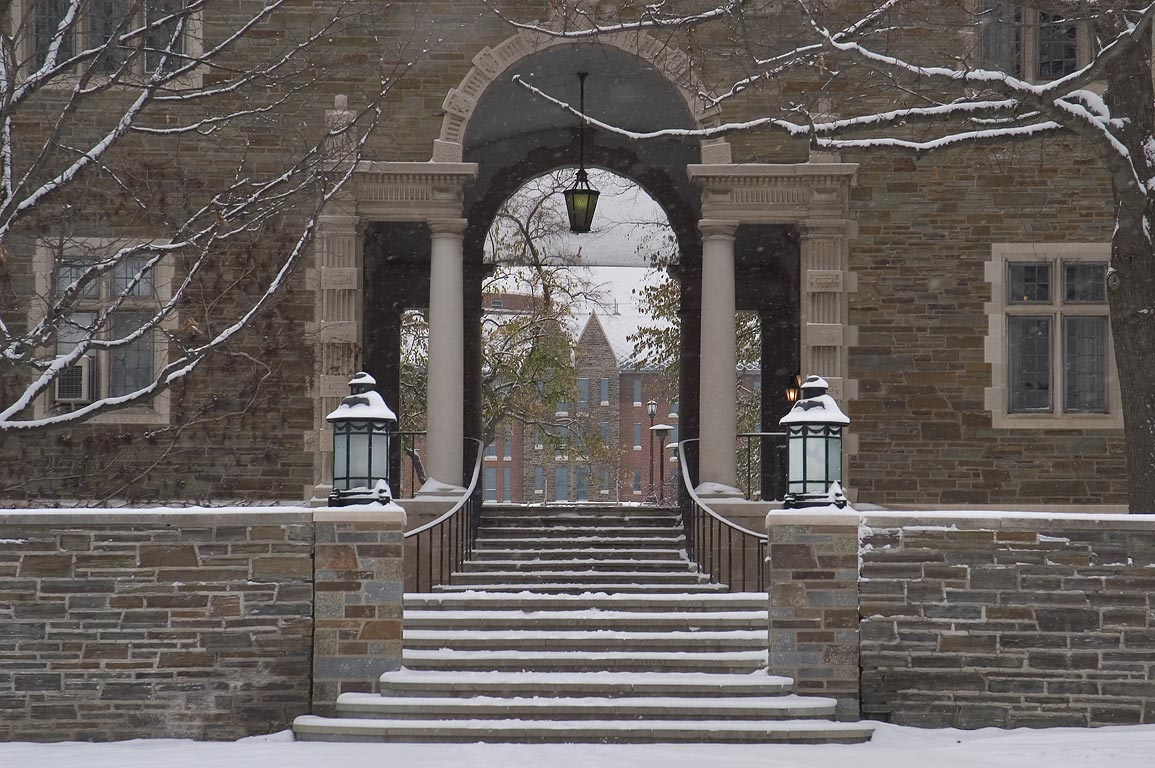
Balch Hall after snowfall

Balch Hall is the only remaining all-female residence hall on the North Campus of Cornell University. Originally, Balch Hall consisted of four eighty-student halls, hence the more former name the Balch Halls, which has fallen out of use. Balch Hall is open only to female undergraduates and is divided into sections, known as units, each with a Residential Advisor who helps the new students acclimate themselves with the campus. Prior to the 2021-2024 renovations, the building was known for its old fashioned design as each room had a personal sink, or shared a sink with one other room.

== History ==
Balch history

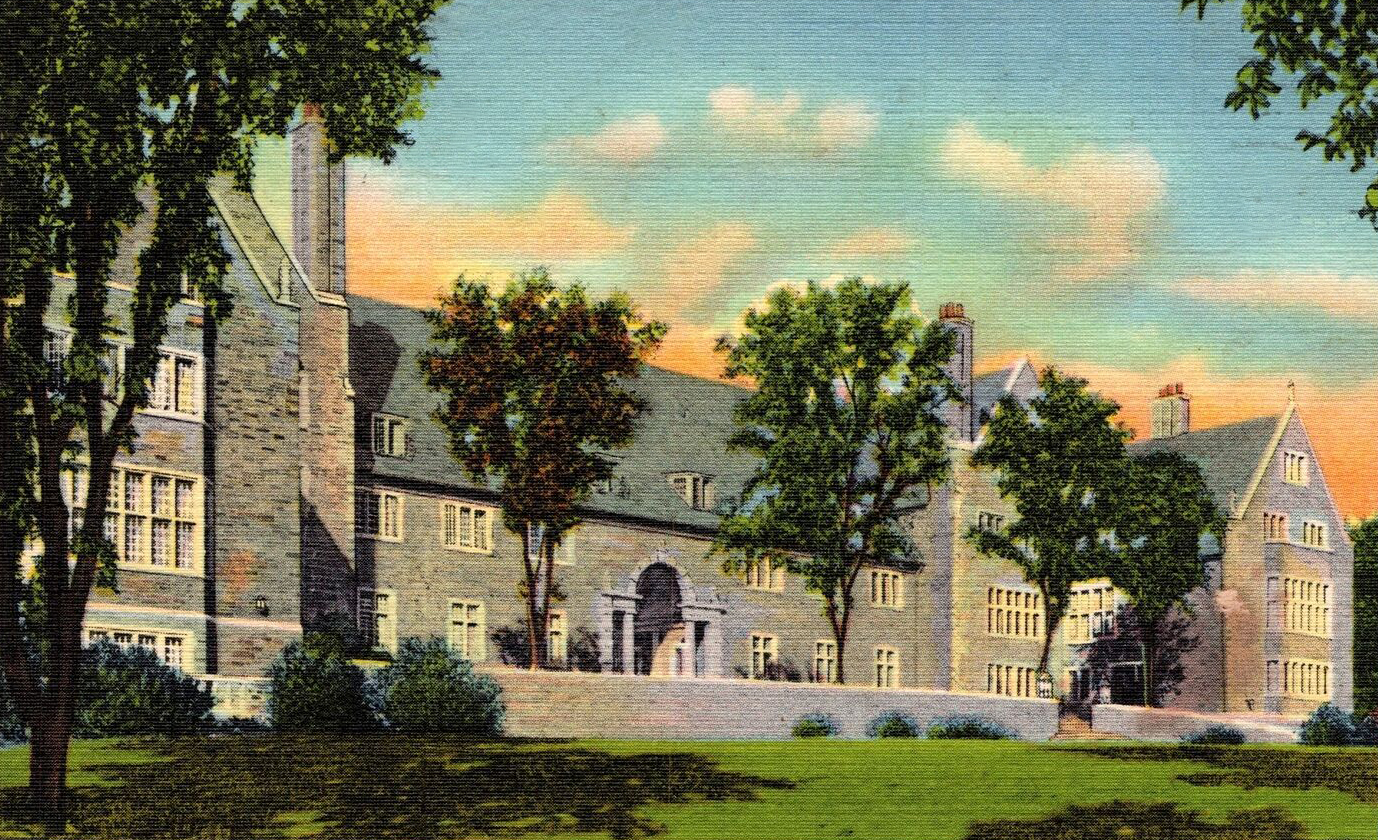
1948 postcard

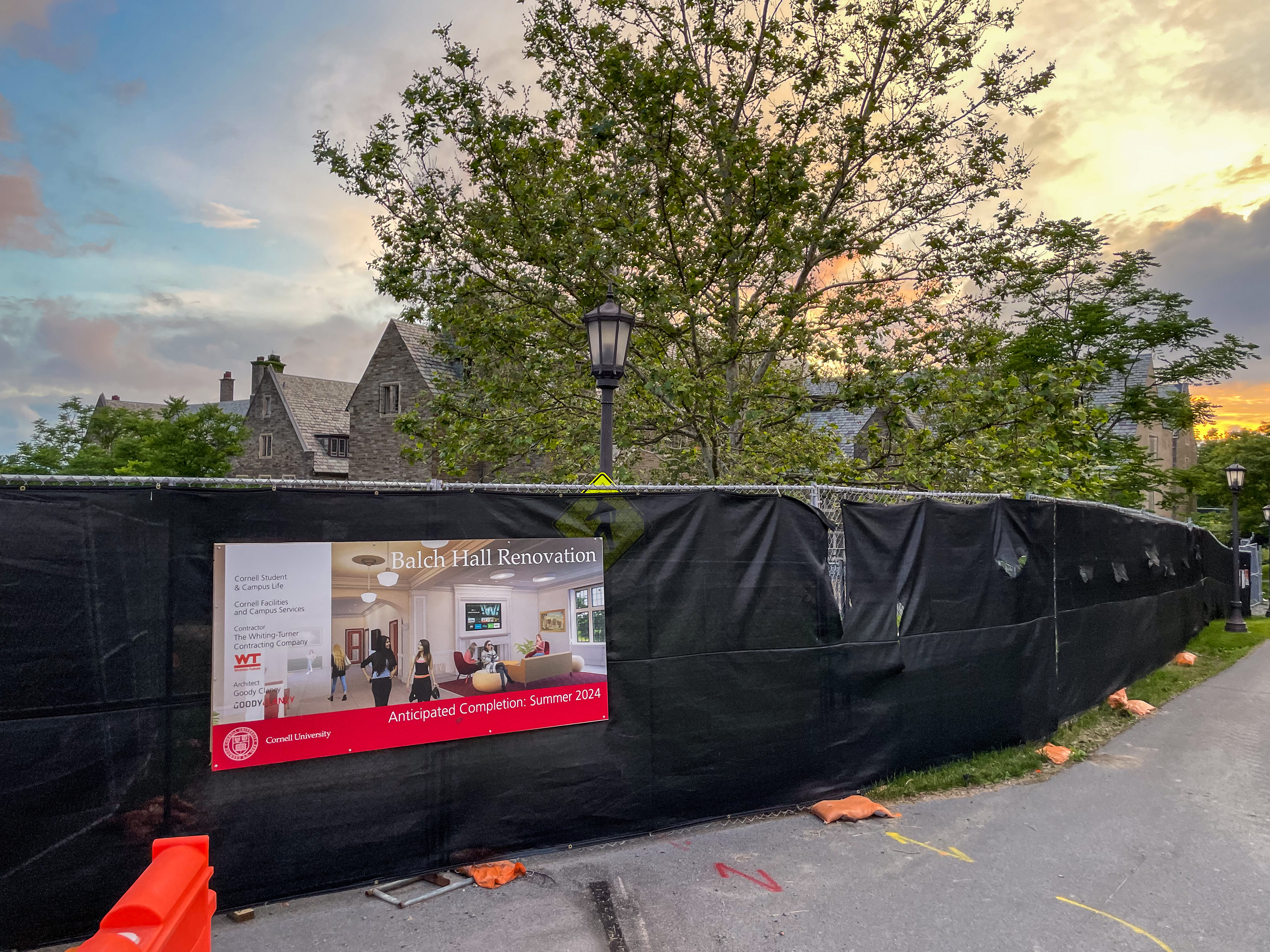
2023 renovation

=== Background ===
In 1920, Cornell founded a committee to research the feasibility of constructing a new women's dormitory to meet the needs of the growing community. In 1922, Frederick L. Ackerman submitted a basic plot for the construction of a dormitory on North Campus and, with approval of the university's Architectural Advisory Board, began seeking donors with the promise that Cornell would pay for up to half of the building's construction. In 1928, the university accepted the $1,650,000 donation of Allen C. Balch 1889 and Janet Balch, a graduate student from 1886 to 1888. When Balch opened in September 1929, it became the third female residential college at Cornell, after Sage College and Risley Hall.

According to legend, Janet Balch insisted that her husband donate the money for the dormitory after attending an event at Allen's fraternity, Alpha Delta Phi. The story goes that Mrs. Balch was offended by the behavior of the undergraduate brothers at an Alpha Delta Phi function. She insisted that her husband should not donate further funds to the fraternity and instead build a dormitory dedicated to the welfare of female students. To this day, as the Balches requested, the dormitory has remained an all-female dormitory.

=== Opening ===
When Balch opened in 1929, it was considered one of the most lavish dormitories in the world. The building was intended to provide "gracious living" and to "exemplify the highest traditions of American Womanhood," according to then-president Livingston Farrand. Balch consisted of four distinct units, each with its own dining room. Each of the four halls were decorated differently in "Early American, Georgian, English Jacobean, and modern Gramercy Park".

Women wore skirts, high heels, and hose to meals, and men were not allowed above the ground floor. Dining meals were served at individual tables by waitresses, and residents enjoyed maid and laundry service.

=== The 1960s ===
The 1960s saw the end of "gracious living." The social rules around clothing and became more relaxed, maid and laundry service ended, and the lavish, expensive furnishings were replaced with standard dorm furniture.

A two-year renovation in the early 1960s converted the four Balch dorms into two units, and introduced TV and study lounges. The four dining rooms were reduced to two, then one, with cafeteria style service instead of sit-down dining with waitresses. The remaining dining hall was known as "Coop 2000", and served low-calorie, natural foods.

At the end of Spring 2000 semester, the dining hall was closed and converted into a student center, cafe, and lecture hall known as the Carol Tatkon Center. In 2021 the center moved to the Robert Purcell Community Center.

=== 2021-2024: Renovation ===
Balch Hall began undergoing a "full-gut renovation" starting in 2021. While the exterior will be preserved, all windows will be replaced, bathroom fixtures upgraded, four new elevators installed, and other improvements for accessibility. Rooms will be reorganized, with some interior walls removed, and capacity will be increased from 436 to 470 beds. Old-fashioned "sink rooms" will be removed. Balch is expected to reopen in time for the fall 2024 semester. North Balch Hall will reopened for the fall 2024 semester, while South Balch remained under renovation and reopened for the fall 2025 semester.

== Notable resident ==
Ruth Bader Ginsburg lived in Balch Hall during her sophomore and senior years as an undergraduate member of the class of 1954. A new residence hall at Cornell was named in Ginsburg's honor in 2022.
