= Cornell North Campus =

Residential section of Cornell University

Coordinates: 42°27′18″N 76°28′39″W

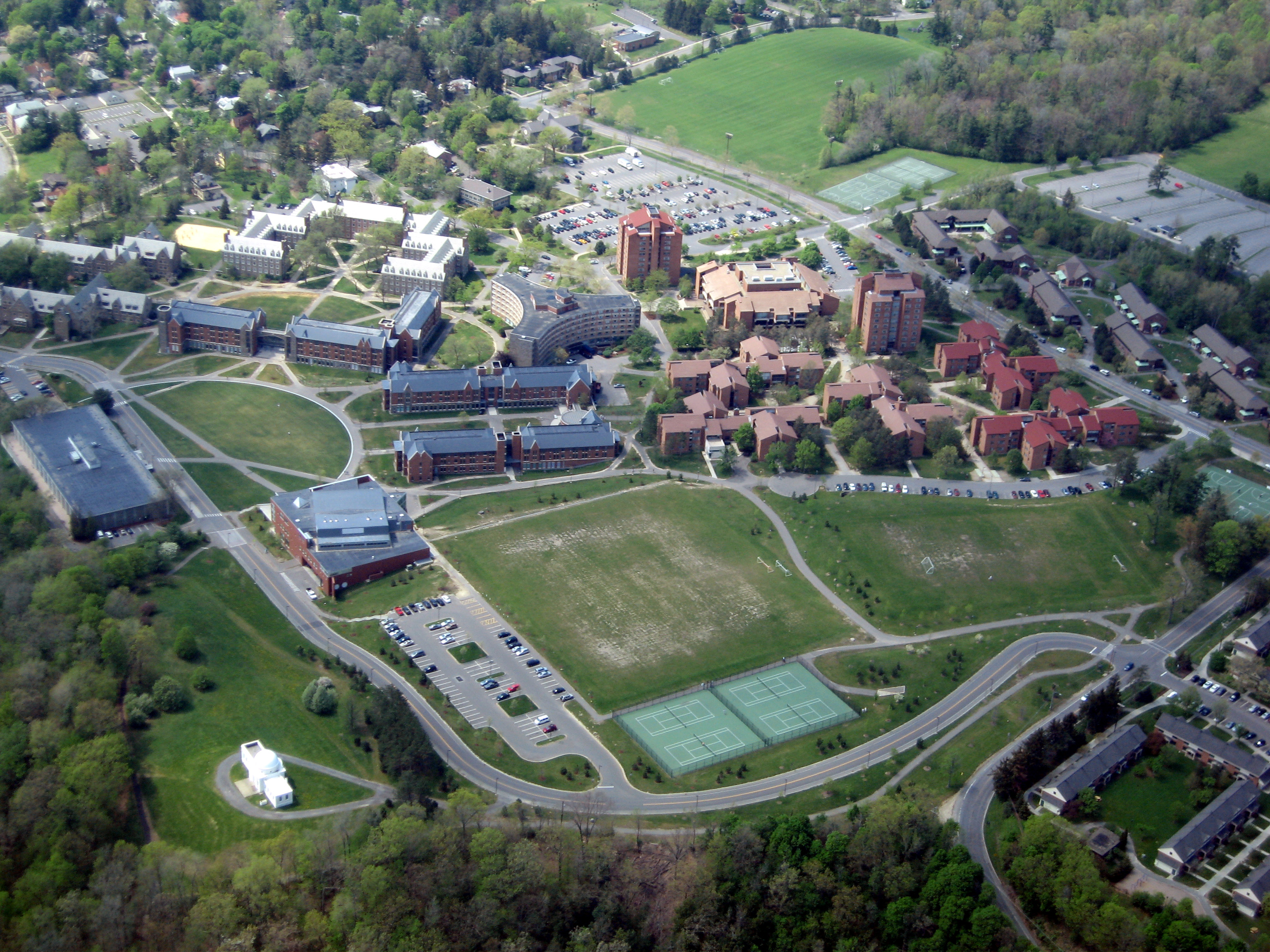
North Campus of Cornell University in 2006, before the residential expansion

North Campus is a mostly residential section of Cornell University's main campus in Ithaca, New York. It includes the neighborhoods located north of Fall Creek. All freshmen are housed on North Campus as part of Cornell's common first-year experience and residential initiatives.

North Campus is principally connected to Central Campus via the Thurston Avenue Bridge over Fall Creek, commonly called the Triphammer Bridge owing to its location above Triphammer Falls, formed by the Beebe Lake Dam. Two pedestrian-only bridges cross to the east: the Triphammer Footbridge connects to Forest Home Drive north of Martha Van Rensselaer Hall, and on the far side of Beebe Lake, the Sackett Footbridge to Forest Home Drive on the north end of the Cornell Botanic Gardens. To the west, the pedestrian-only Suspension Bridge connects the Cornell Heights neighborhood to University Avenue just north of the Herbert F. Johnson Museum of Art, and the Stewart Avenue Bridge conveys Stewart Avenue across the gorge directly above Ithaca Falls.

== History ==
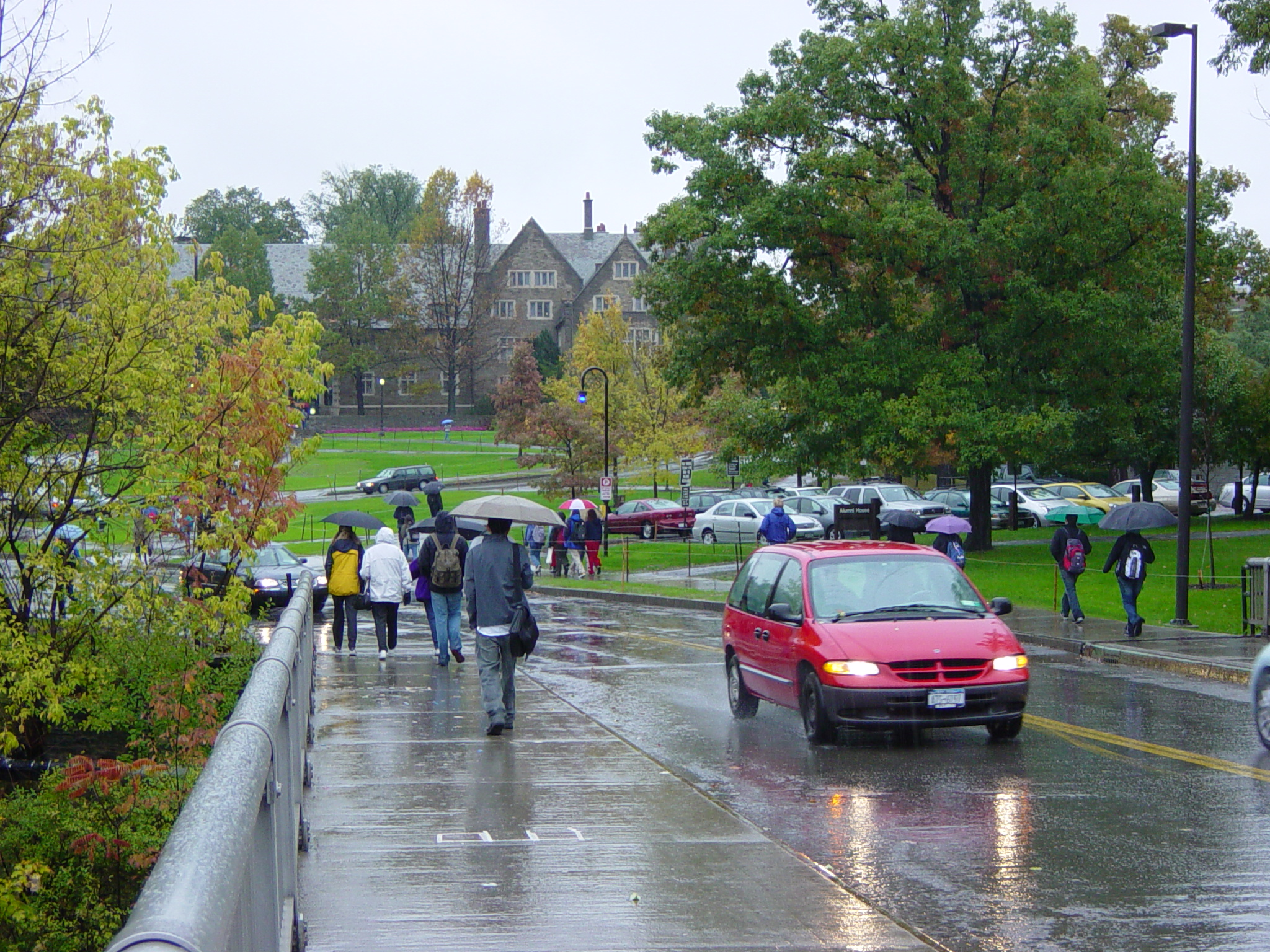
North Campus viewed from the Thurston Avenue Bridge with Balch Hall visible in the center

=== 20th century ===
From 1913 to 1970, the area north of Fall Creek held Cornell University's women-only dormitories. Risley (1913), Comstock (1925), Balch (1929), Dickson (1946) and Donlon (1961) were referred to as the "women's dorms." Visitation by men was strictly regimented. The original master plan for the area called for the pattern of Balch-type courtyards to be extended northward. All of these buildings were designed for women and included self-contained dining facilities as well as parlors for receiving male visitors. While Dickson was built consistent with the spirit of the plan, it was abandoned in the 1960s due to cost, with Donlon and Hasbrouck both employing modern architecture and lacking integrated dining halls.

In 1970, a new set of red brick dormitories called "North Campus" opened, consisting of the Low Rise and High Rise complexes. A North Campus Union, later named after financier and Board of Trustees chair Robert Purcell, opened the following year. Although three more Low Rise dorms (#2 to #4) were planned, funding was not available, and the area between High Rises 1 and 5 was left undeveloped. Also in 1970, Cornell started experimenting with coed dorms, and all buildings except Balch Hall (which is limited to housing women by a bequest) gradually became coed. With coeducation, the name of the entire area north of the creek became "North Campus."

In 1972, to compensate the Athletics Department for the loss of the Lower Alumni Fields to biology buildings, intramural playing fields were developed on North Campus at Jessup Fields.

The need for additional dorms became pressing, and the Trustees commissioned Richard Meier to design new dorm buildings which followed the contours of the fairways of the abandoned golf course site. Again, economics prevented this striking design from being built. The townhouses now occupy a portion of this site.

The present programmatic layout of North Campus was initially proposed in 1997, by then-Cornell President Hunter R. Rawlings III. It was designed to promote the unification of the freshman living areas. North Campus was brought about to bring together Cornell's disjointed first-year programs. This North Campus Initiative, as the proposal was called, united the vision of Charles Dagit and Alan Chimacoff with the Hillier Group and Dagit-Saylor Associates chosen to implement the plan which led to the construction of Mews Hall, Court Hall, and Appel Commons. Both Mews and Court are considered to be temporary names, to be replaced by the names of donors.

=== 21st century ===
On October 14, 2005, the southern wing of Court Hall was re-dedicated as Bauer Hall, marking the generosity of the Bauer family, and the B Wing of Court was renamed Kay, making the hall's full name Court-Kay-Bauer.

==== North Campus Residential Expansion (NCRE) ====
North Campus Residential Expansion (NCRE)

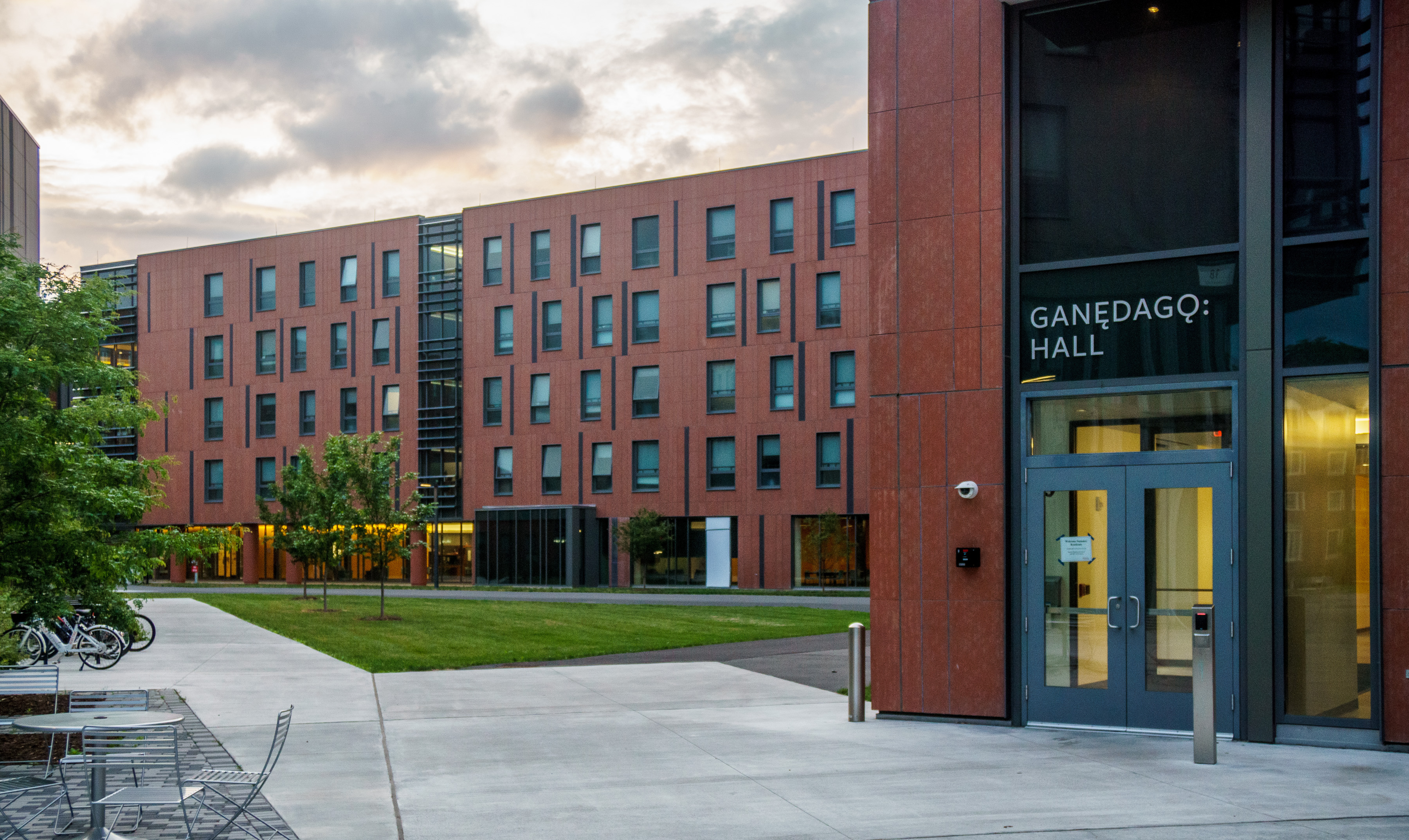
Ganedago

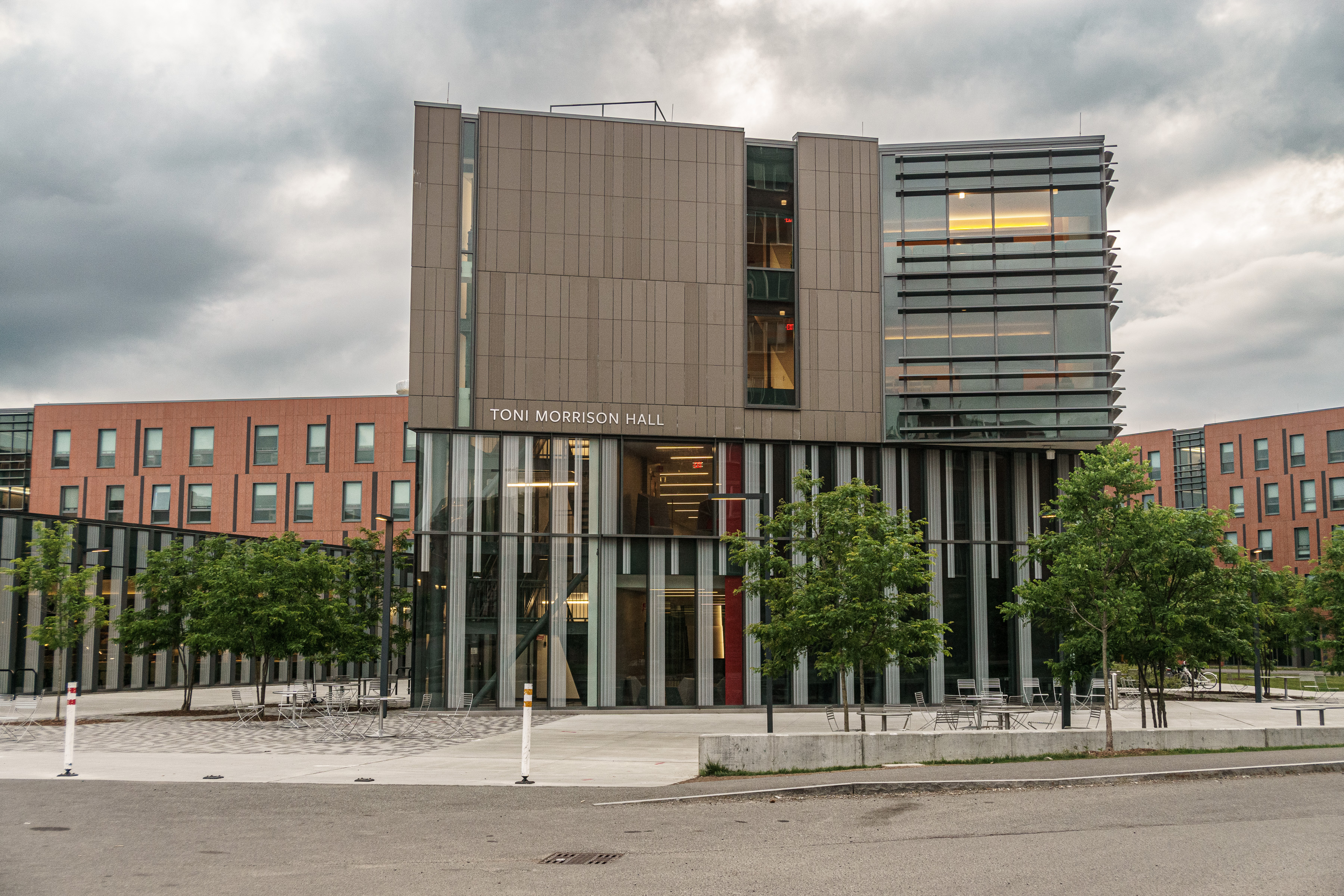
Morrison

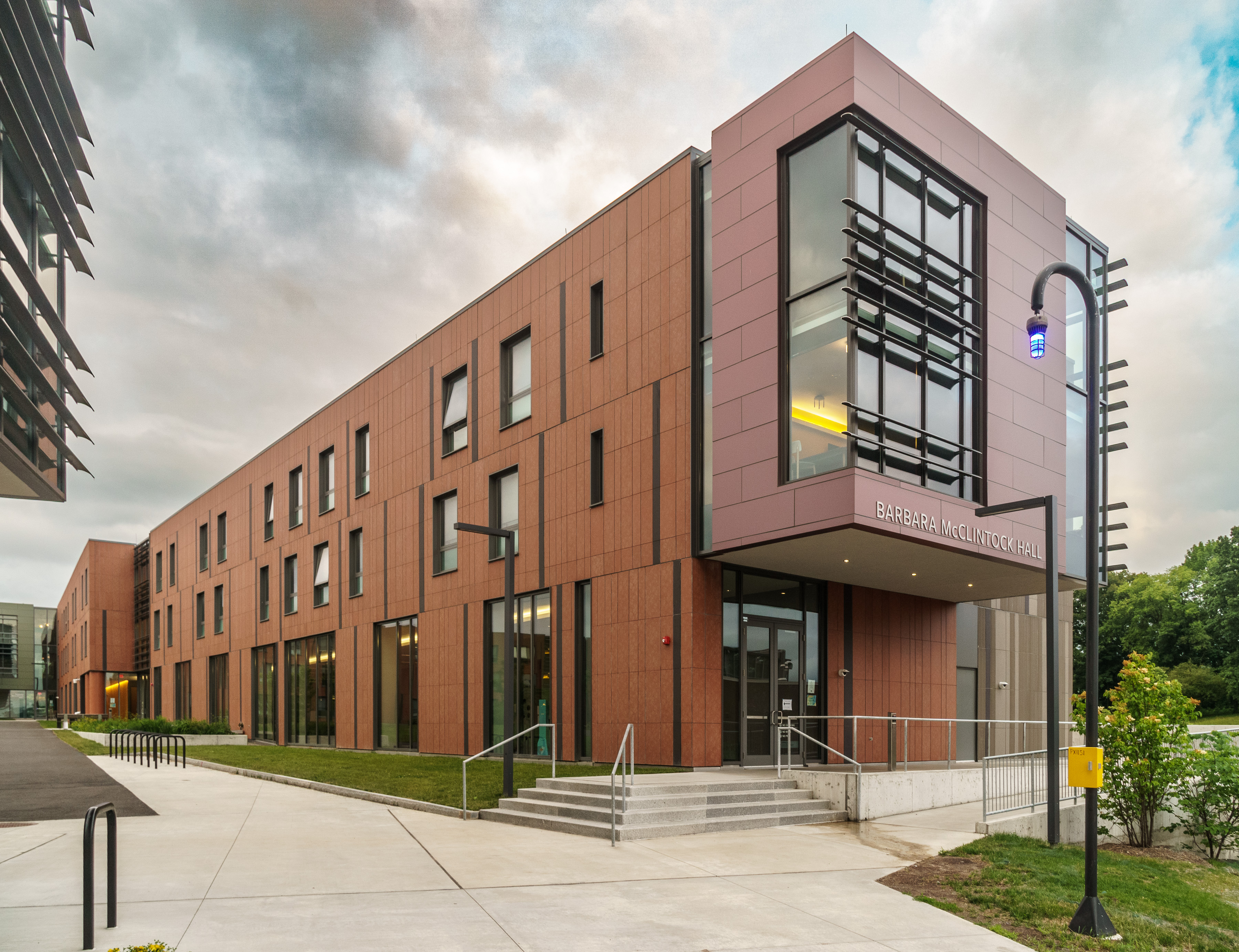
McClintock

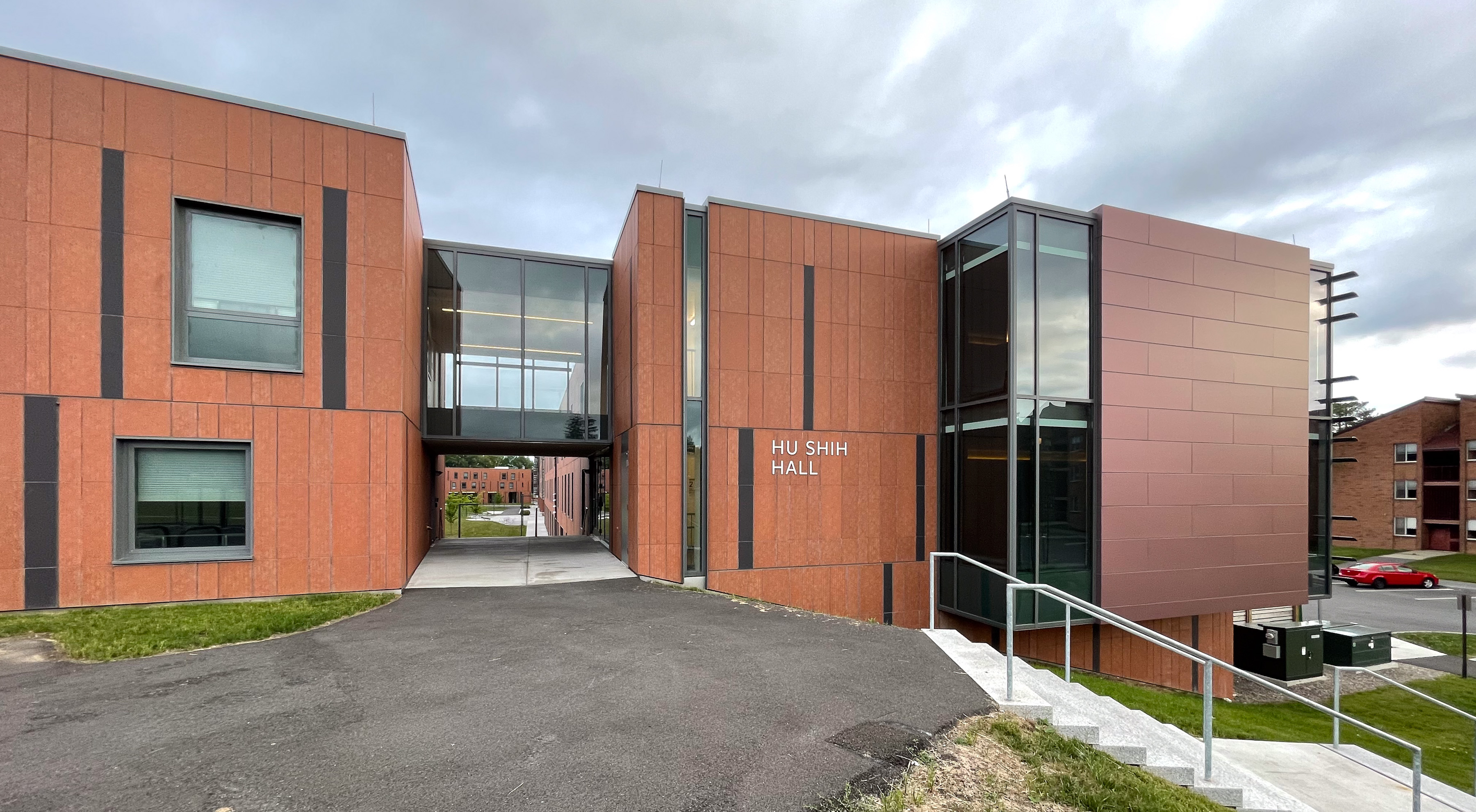
Hu Shih

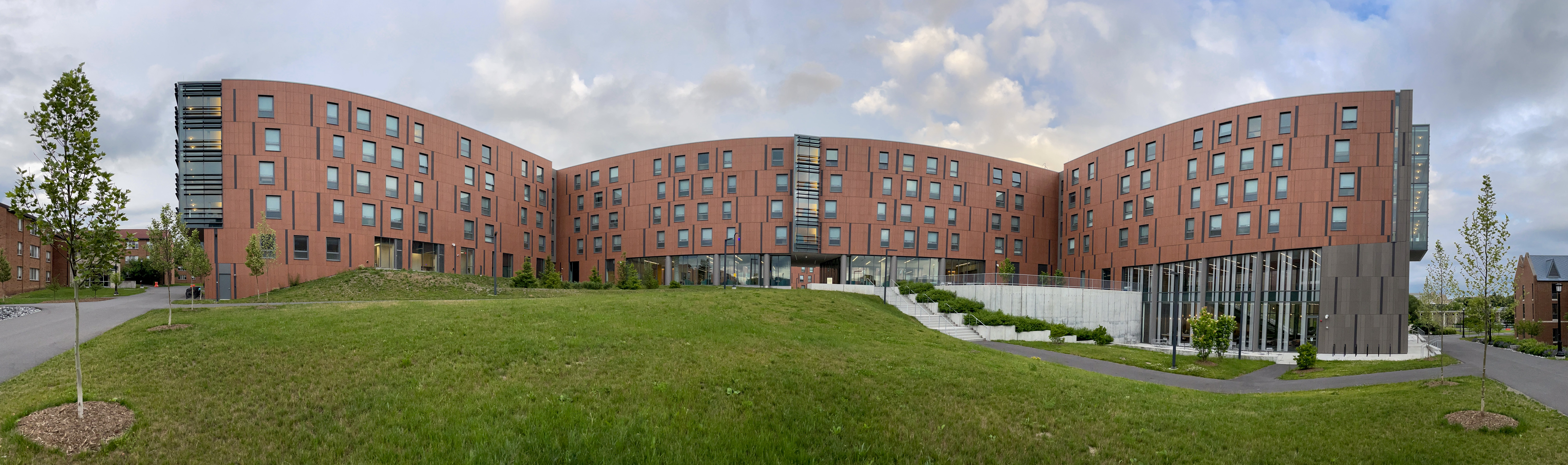
Ruth Bader Ginsburg Hall

The North Campus Residential Expansion (NCRE), announced in 2018, added six buildings with about 2,000 beds and a dining hall to North Campus. The project was led by Trowbridge Wolf Michaels Landscape Architects. The five new residence halls are named for alumni Toni Morrison, M.A. ’55, Ruth Bader Ginsburg ’54, Barbara McClintock (B.S. 1923, M.A. 1925, Ph.D. 1927), Hu Shih (B.A. 1914), and to honor the Cayuga Nation ("Ganędagǫ"). Morrison and Ganędagǫ opened in fall 2021, and Shih, McClintock and Ginsburg opened in fall 2022. While McClintock, Hu Shih, and RBG exclusively house freshmen, Morrison and Ganedago only house upper-level students.

== Risley Hall ==
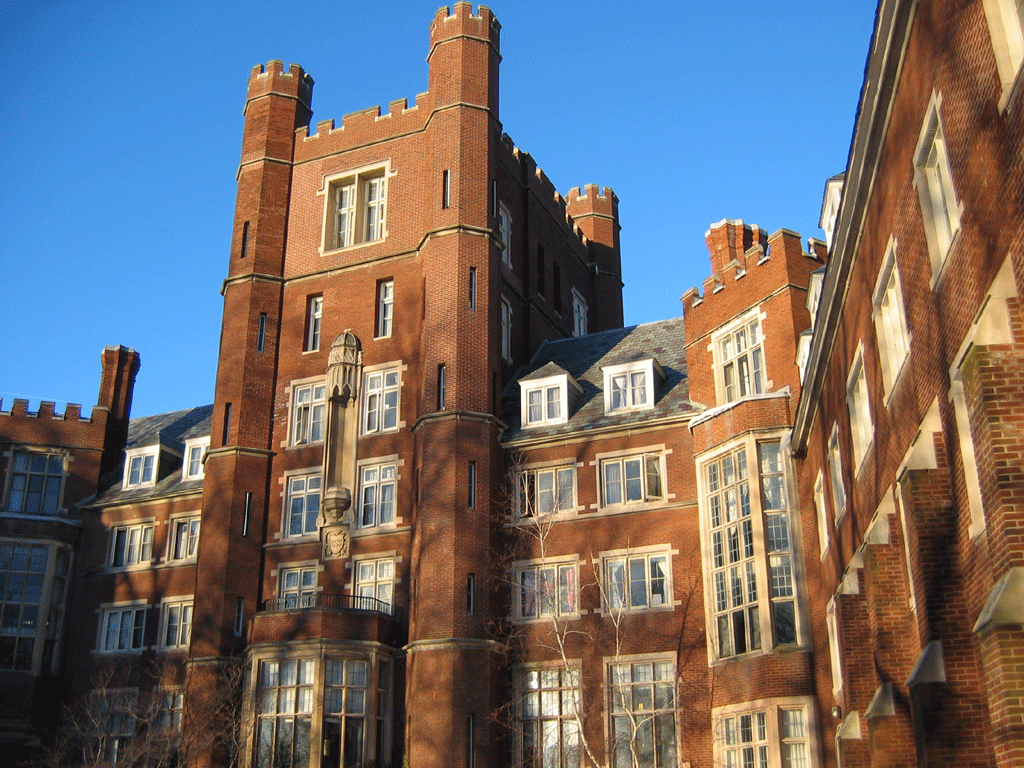
Risley Residential College

Risley Residential College is a residential college for the creative and performing arts. Commonly known as Risley Hall, Risley Residential College, or just Risley, it is a themed residence hall at Cornell University. Unlike most other traditional dormitories on campus, Risley is a residential college, meaning that the house members, "Risleyites", are encouraged to eat together at the in-house dining hall, can live as house members for all four or five years they spend enrolled at Cornell, and participate in educational activities, such as guest lectures, within their dormitory.

The building houses 190 students who are admitted by applications that are reviewed by current Risleyites and two Guest Suite Artists ("GSA"), who live in the building and organize regular programs in which the house members participate. As a dormitory, Risley offers a unique living experience. The Tudor Gothic building itself is shaped like a large, red castle. When constructed, the architect, William Henry Miller, was requested to design the floor plan such that no two rooms would be identical. Consequently, the rooms vary greatly. Sizes range from a single room that is 93 square feet (9 m²), a former maid's room, to a double room that is 273 square feet (25 m²), the largest double on campus. Various room features include balconies, fireplaces, dumbwaiter shafts, secret stairwells, bay windows, embrasures, and turrets.

== Traditional residences ==
=== Balch Hall ===
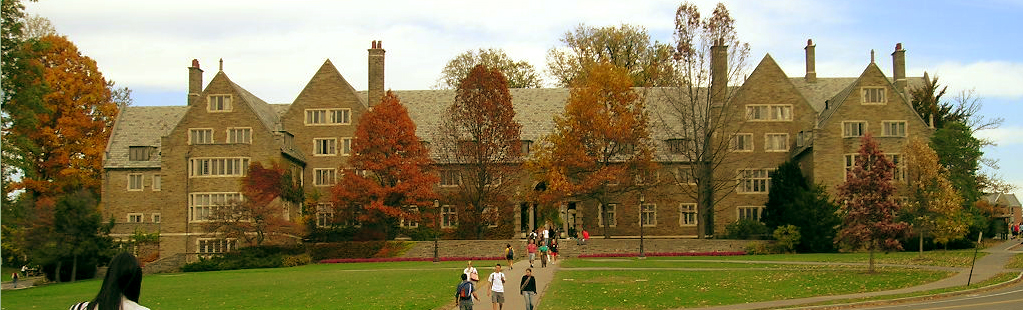
The façade of Balch Hall

On North Campus, Balch Hall stands out for its English Renaissance style. Originally, each of the four halls were decorated differently in "Early American, Georgian, English Jacobean, and modern Gramercy Park". Balch Hall and Barbara McClintock Hall are the only all-female dormitories left on North Campus. Balch is undergoing a "full-gut renovation" from 2021-2024. With North Balch Hall reopening for the 2024-25 academic year, McClintock will no longer be an all-female residence hall.

=== Court-Kay-Bauer Community ===
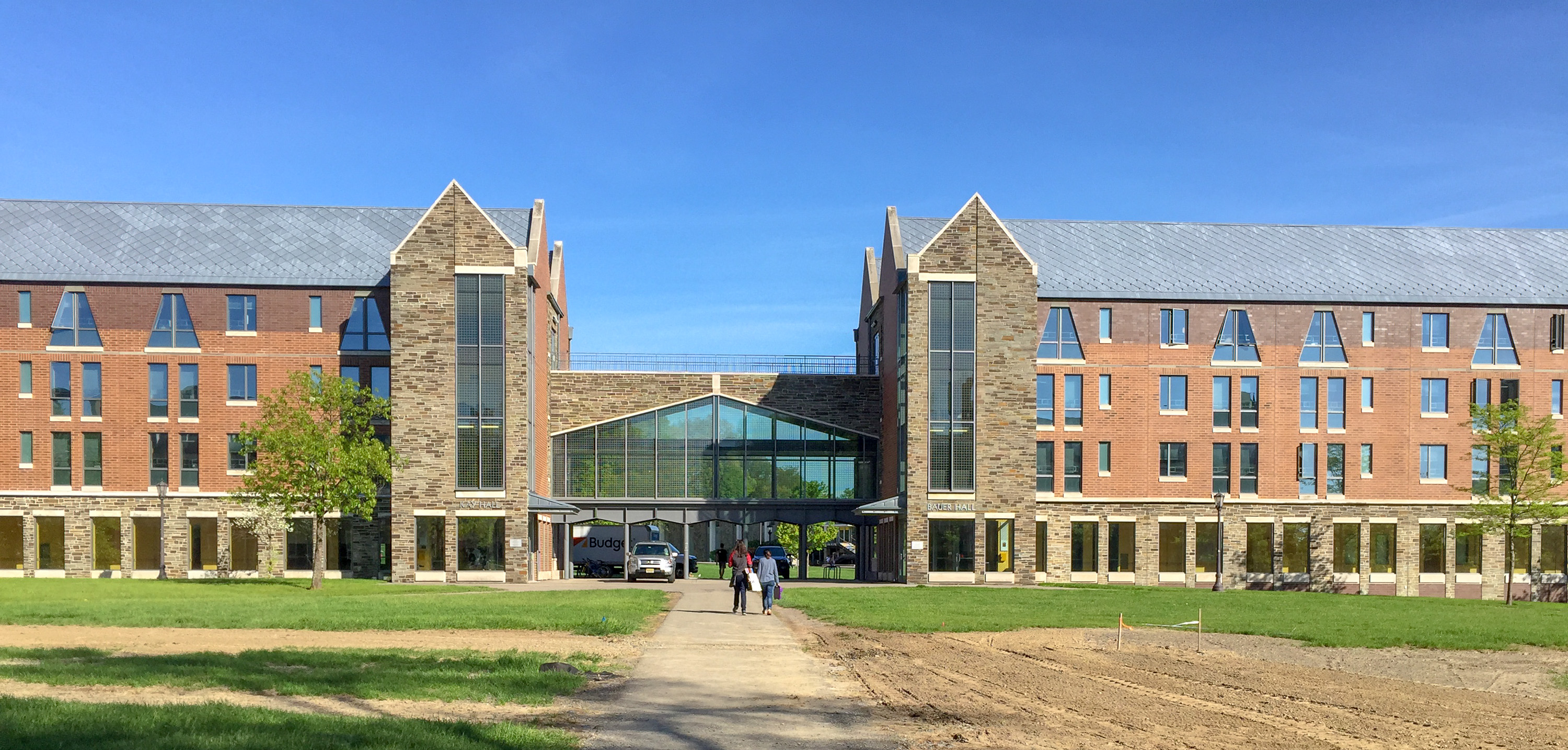
Kay Hall (left) and Bauer Hall (right) on Cornell's North Campus

Court, Kay and Bauer Halls are joined by an enclosed bridge on the second and third floor and an open air walkway (weather permitting) on the fourth floor. The residence hall opened in the fall of 2001 as Court Hall; in the fall of 2005, the south section was renamed Bauer Hall to honor Robert and Virginia Bauer's donation to the university. In autumn 2006, the former B wing of the building was renamed Kay Hall, in honor of Cornell alumnus Bill Kay's donation. Court-Kay-Bauer houses 270 first-year students, 9 Resident Advisors, 1 Residence Hall Director and a Faculty in Residence.

=== Clara Dickson Hall ===
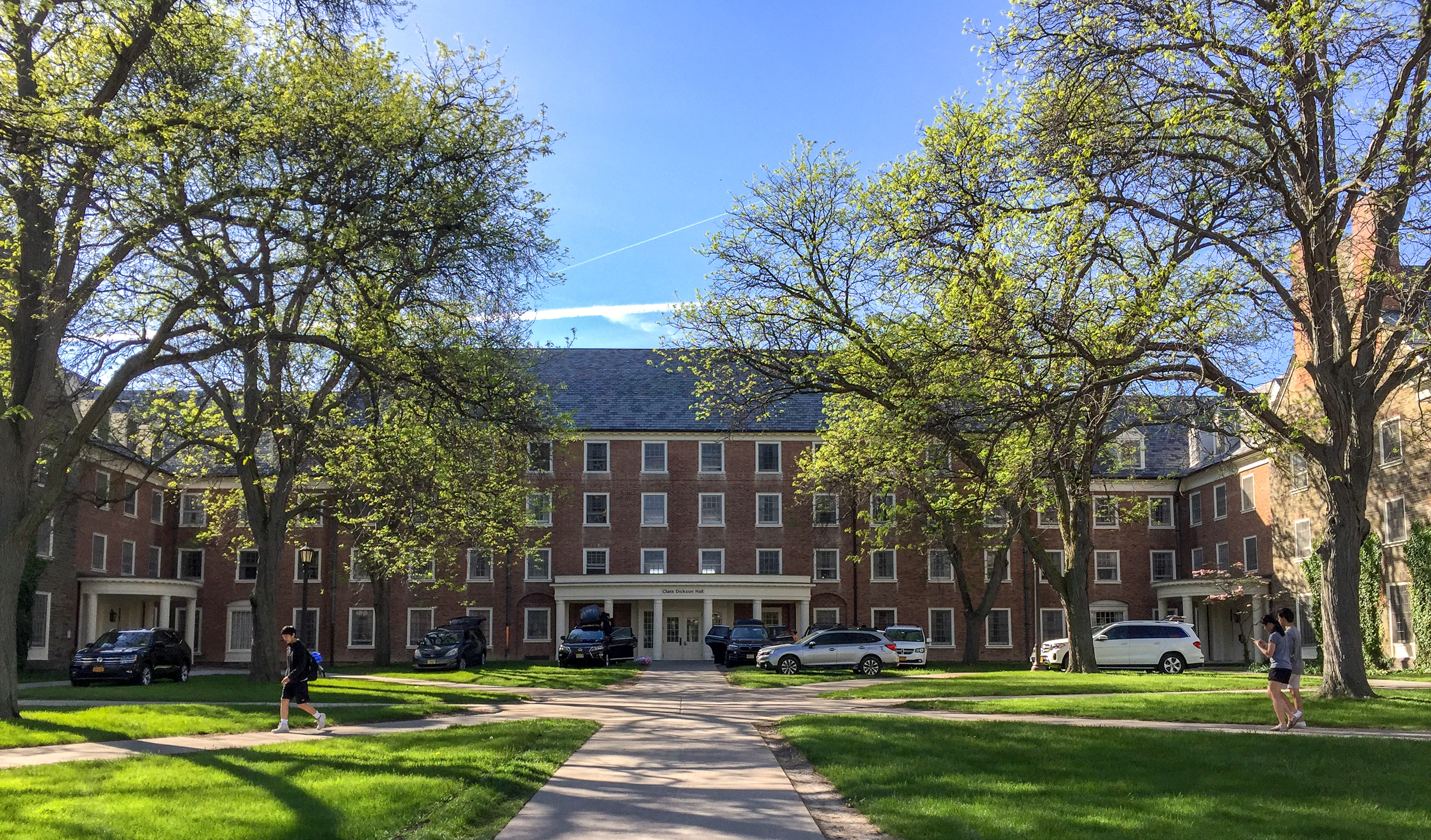
Clara Dickson Hall

Clara Dickson Hall or just "Dickson" is a Georgian-style building located on North Campus, built in 1946. With a gross area of 168,791 sq ft (15,681 m²) and a net area of 139,899 sq ft (12,997 m²), it is the largest dormitory in the Ivy League. It houses 575 first-year students in a variety of singles, doubles, and triples. Clara Dickson Hall also is home to the Multicultural Living Learning Unit, one of Cornell's residential program houses. When Dickson was an all-female residence hall, it had a dining hall.

=== Mary Donlon Hall ===
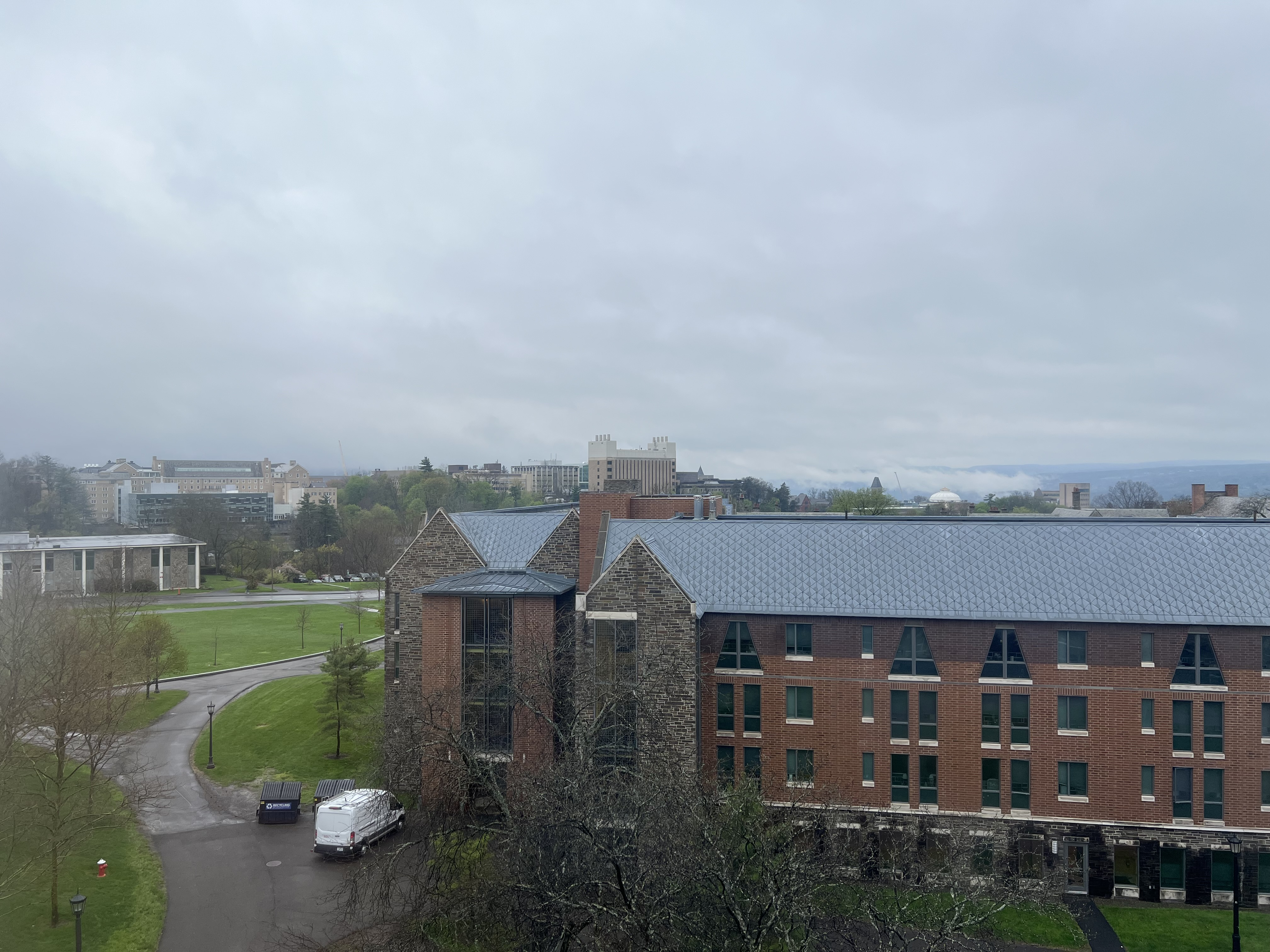
View of CKB from Mary Donlon

Donlon Hall, named after Judge Mary H. Donlon Class of 1920, is located north of Court and Mews Halls and houses 472 first-year students arranged in double rooms (with a few singles and two "quads," three-room-suites for four students, per floor), typically sized 12' x 18'. It has 6 floors with facilities including a TV/social lounge, piano, laundry, elevators, kitchen, computer networking, study lounge, lofting furniture, and library.

Donlon was designed by Beardsley & Beardsley of Auburn and Von Storch and Barkavage of Waverly, Pennsylvania in a unique triangular layout designed to maximize outside exposure. Cottages on Circle and Wait Avenues were demolished for its construction, with a gross area of 133,594 sq ft (12,411.3 m^{2}) and net area of 116,094 sq ft (10,785.5 m^{2}). When it opened in 1961 it housed 430 women, 3 floors for freshmen and two for upper-level students. It was the first women's dorm without its own dining hall, cut due to expense. After the gender integration of dorms in 1970, it housed a mix of frosh and upperclassmen until the 1998 residential initiative, after which it housed only first-year students.

=== High Rises ===
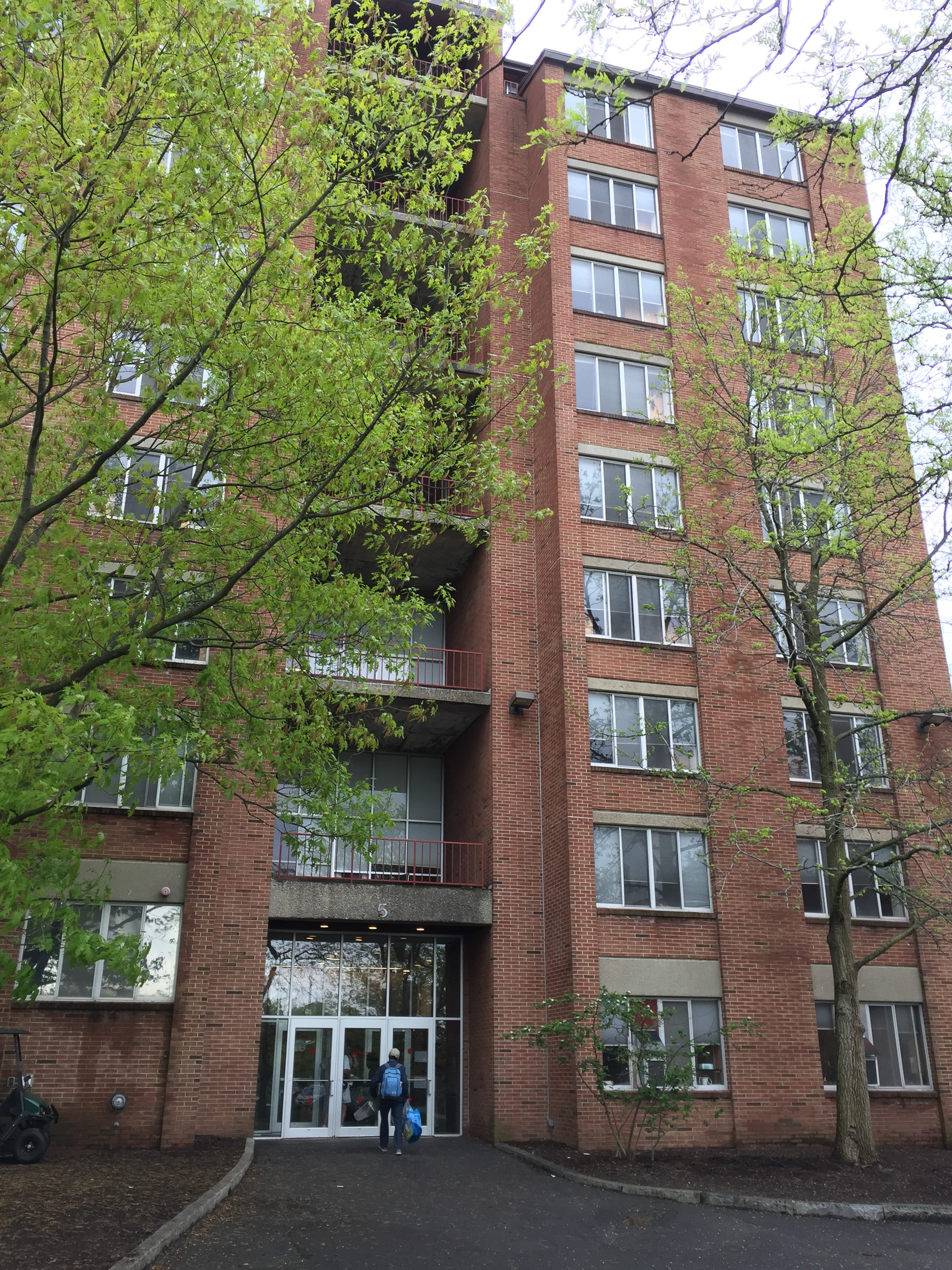
High Rise 5

George Jameson Hall and High Rise 5, completed in 1972, are two tall brick buildings on North Campus located at opposite sides of Robert Purcell Community Center. Each houses 225 freshmen, 5 Resident Advisors, a Faculty in Residence in Jameson, and an RHD in High Rise 5. There are 5 main living floors per building, although there are student rooms on the ground and lounge floors. The rooms are arranged in suite style, with 2 singles, and 2 doubles; or 2 singles, a double and a triple. Each of the five floors has 6 suites, a kitchen, and a common lounge, which can be converted into a quintuple in dire situations. On the top floors are Skylounges, which provide views of all of North Campus. The building is only accessible by elevators if a person wishes to go up because the stairs up are not accessible from the ground floor.

=== Low Rises ===
The Low Rise complex is composed of Low Rises 6, 7, 8, 9 and 10. Low Rise 6 and 7 operate as traditional suite style dormitories, whereas 8, 9 and 10 operate as Program Houses (Holland International Living Center, Just About Music, and Ujamaa respectively). The buildings were constructed in 1975. Low Rises 6 and 7 house 168 students while Low Rises 8,9, and 10 house 144 students. Each Low Rise is composed of four units, each of which have 6 suites, a kitchen, an RA room (formerly a study lounge), and a unit lounge. Each suite is composed of a bathroom, two singles, a double and a triple (though the doubles are used as "forced" triples in Low Rises 6 and 7). Each building also has its own main lounge, with some having apartments for Faculty-in-Residence or RHDs and their families to stay.

=== Mews Hall ===
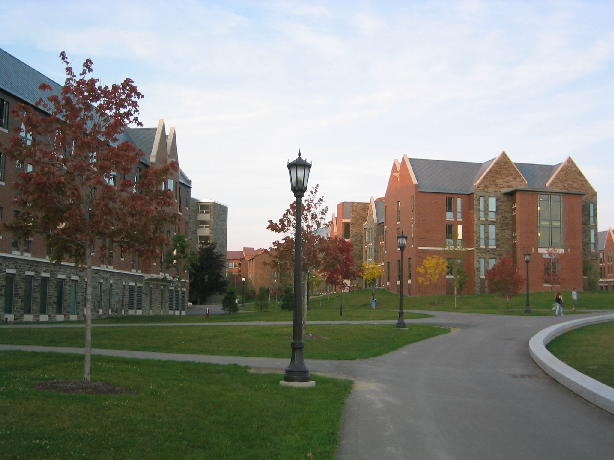
West Side of Mews Hall

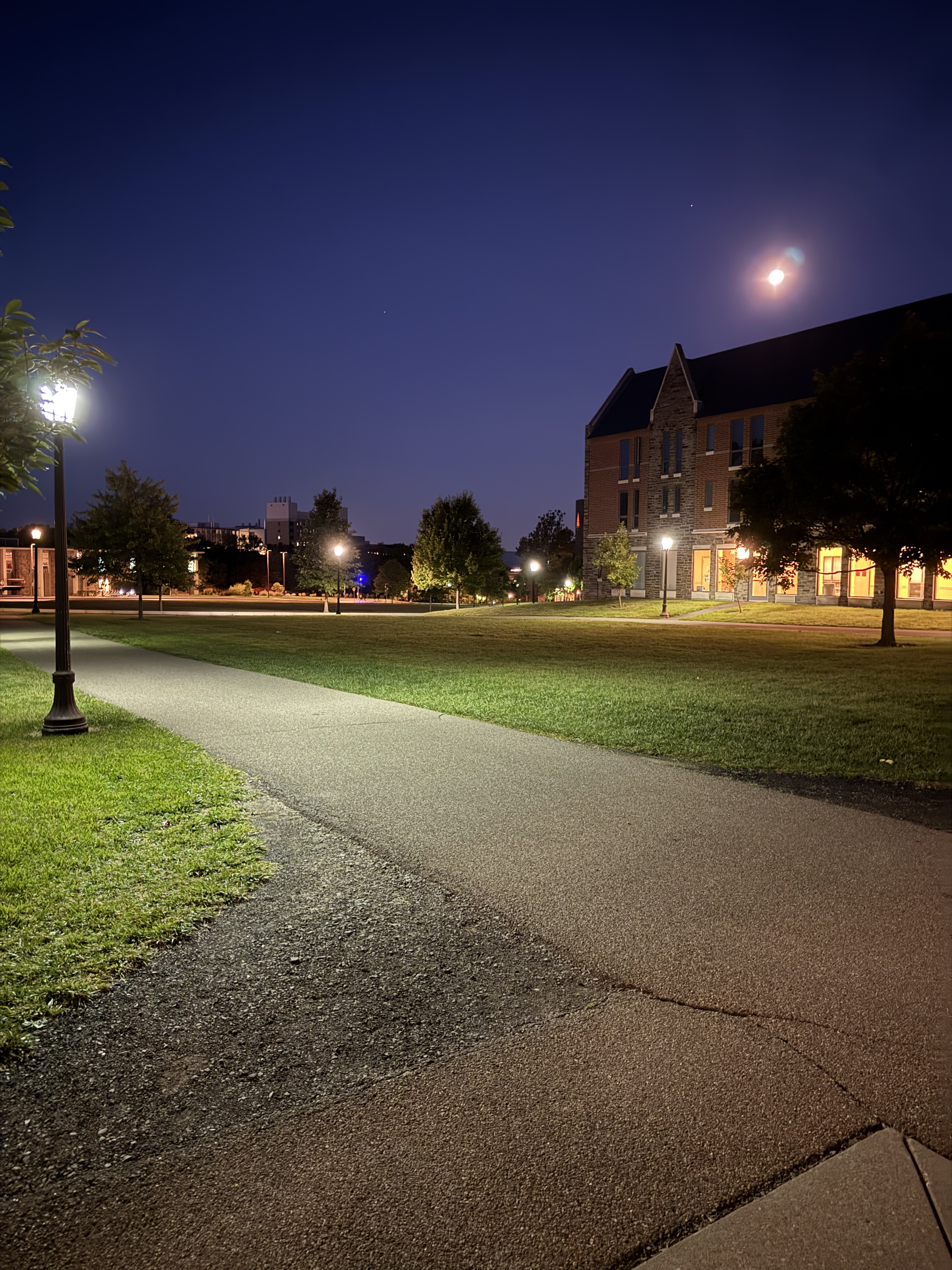
East Side of Mews Hall

Mews Hall, built in 2000, is located near Appel Commons and Helen Newman Hall and has a gross area of 87,129 sq ft (8,094.5 m^{2}) and a net area of 72,790 sq ft (6,762 m^{2}). The building is designed and named after Mews, a building style originating with British stables. The building is separated into two parallel halves, east and west, which are linked by a hallway and Lund study lounge. Between the wings is a large courtyard. The Western wing houses two floors of students as well the Residence Hall Director and the Faculty in Residence, while the Eastern wing houses three floors of students. Each floor has two study lounges and a shared TV lounge and kitchen. Mews Hall houses 279 first-year students arranged in suites of singles and doubles. The air-conditioned facilities include a TV/social lounge, piano, laundry, elevators, computer networking, bike storage room. Mews Hall is governed by a student elected Hall Council and Judicial Board and has a student committee known as the Community Outreach Group which is responsible for organizing community service programs.

=== Toni Morrison Hall ===
Toni Morrison Hall houses 306 upper-level undergraduates in its single and double rooms. The dormitory is connected to Morrison Dining, which was opened in January 2022 and is the newest dining hall on North Campus. Serving visitors and students of all years, the 58,230-square-foot facility offers a variety of dining options including a Wok Station, Global Station, Salad Bar, Halal Station, and Kosher Station. Morrison Dining was awarded the 2023 Gold Medal for best Residential Dining Facility by the National Association of College & University Food Services. The dining hall is also home to the Discovery Kitchen, a teaching kitchen with up to 24 stations established through a collaboration between Cornell Dining and the Division of Nutritional Sciences. The NS 2470 - Food for Contemporary Living course holds classes in the Discovery Kitchen for students to gain hands-on experience in food preparation, and Cornell Dining also holds Get Cooking events in the space for students throughout the semester.

== Program Houses ==
=== Akwe:kon ===
Akwe:kon

Akwe:kon, pronounced a-gway'-go, Residential College is the first university residence of its kind in the country purposely built for the interests of American Indians.It was established in 1991, and means "all of us". The community has 35 residents and the building's landscape was set up with Native American symbolism and extensive input from Native Americans.

=== Ecology House ===
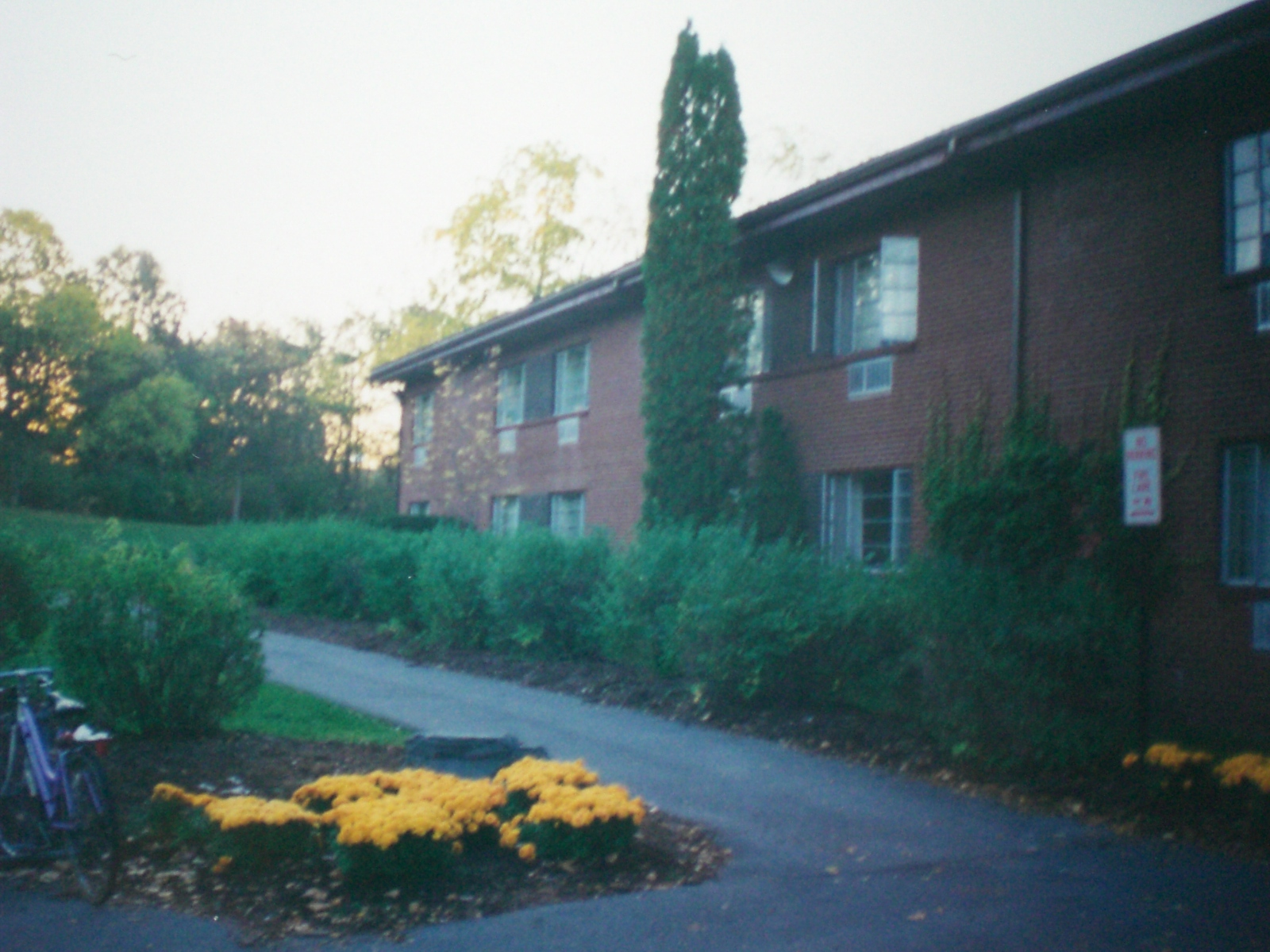
Ecology House

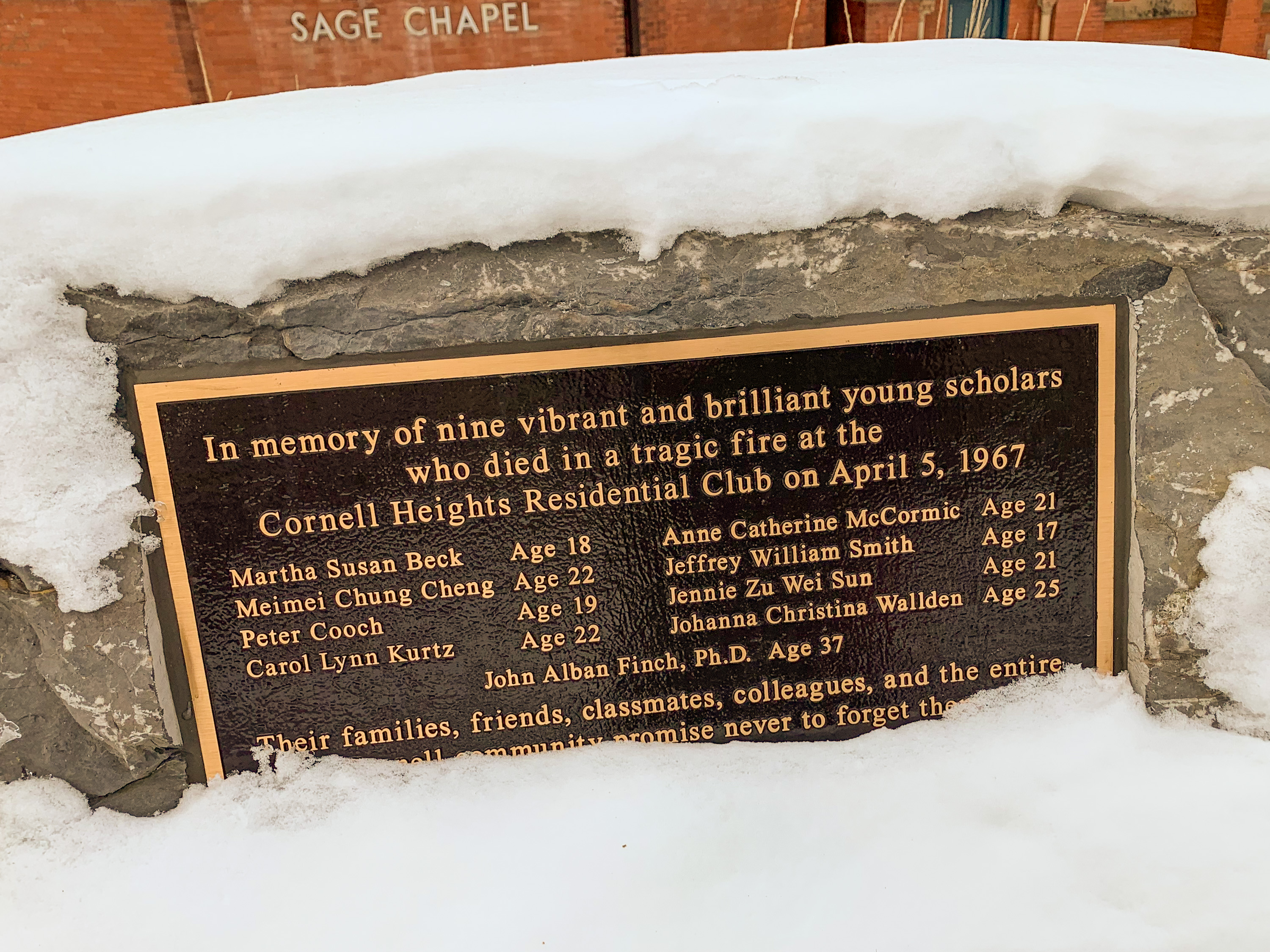
This plaque memorializing the 1967 fire is located next to Sage Chapel

Ecology House: The Hurlburt Residential College for Environmental Education and Awareness, commonly called Eco House, houses 96 students. Of these 96, approximately 45% are upperclassmen; 45% are freshmen; and 10% are transfers. The building has a large kitchen, several common areas (For both quiet studying and socializing), laundry facilities, and a bike room in the basement.

The house has several committees and clubs. Steering Committee is the governing body of the house, meeting every Sunday to discuss house related business and vote on certain topics, and sponsors many events throughout the year, including Ice Cream Nights on Wednesdays, the Fall Formal, and the Spring Formal. Project Greenhouse is a Cornell-based club housed in Eco, which helps improve and maintain the self-built greenhouse in the backyard, while also sponsoring events related to plant sciences and awareness. They also run a composting program that every resident can easily participate in. Other committees include Eco Creates, an environmentally centered arts & crafts committee, Eco Adventures, which organizes outdoor excursions and indoor activities, and Eco Eats, which hosts baking competitions, themed house dinners, and the much beloved "David Attenborough Pancake Brunches", which consists of eating pancakes made prior and watching Planet Earth documentaries.

Eco House is located behind the Africana Studies and Research Center. The residential building has three floors with two wings each, except for the basement which has only one wing. Eco House was originally a hotel; consequently, each resident enjoys the luxury of his or her own bathroom, shared only with one's roommate. Residents are also permitted to keep small, containable pets. Eco House has four Residential Advisors (RAs) and one Residence Hall Director (RHD).

Before becoming Ecology House, the building was the Cornell Heights Residential Club, an off-campus residence for students in an experimental accelerated Ph.D. program, and the site of a 1967 fire that killed eight students and a professor.

=== Holland International Living Center ===
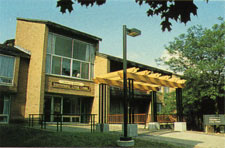
Holland International Living Center

The Jerome H. Holland International Living Center houses 144 students from the United States and other countries who would like to interact with people from across the globe on a daily basis. There are debates, presentations and forums to help foster international understanding and communication. The residential hall is named after Cornell alumnus Jerome "Brud" Holland, class of 1939.

=== Just About Music ===
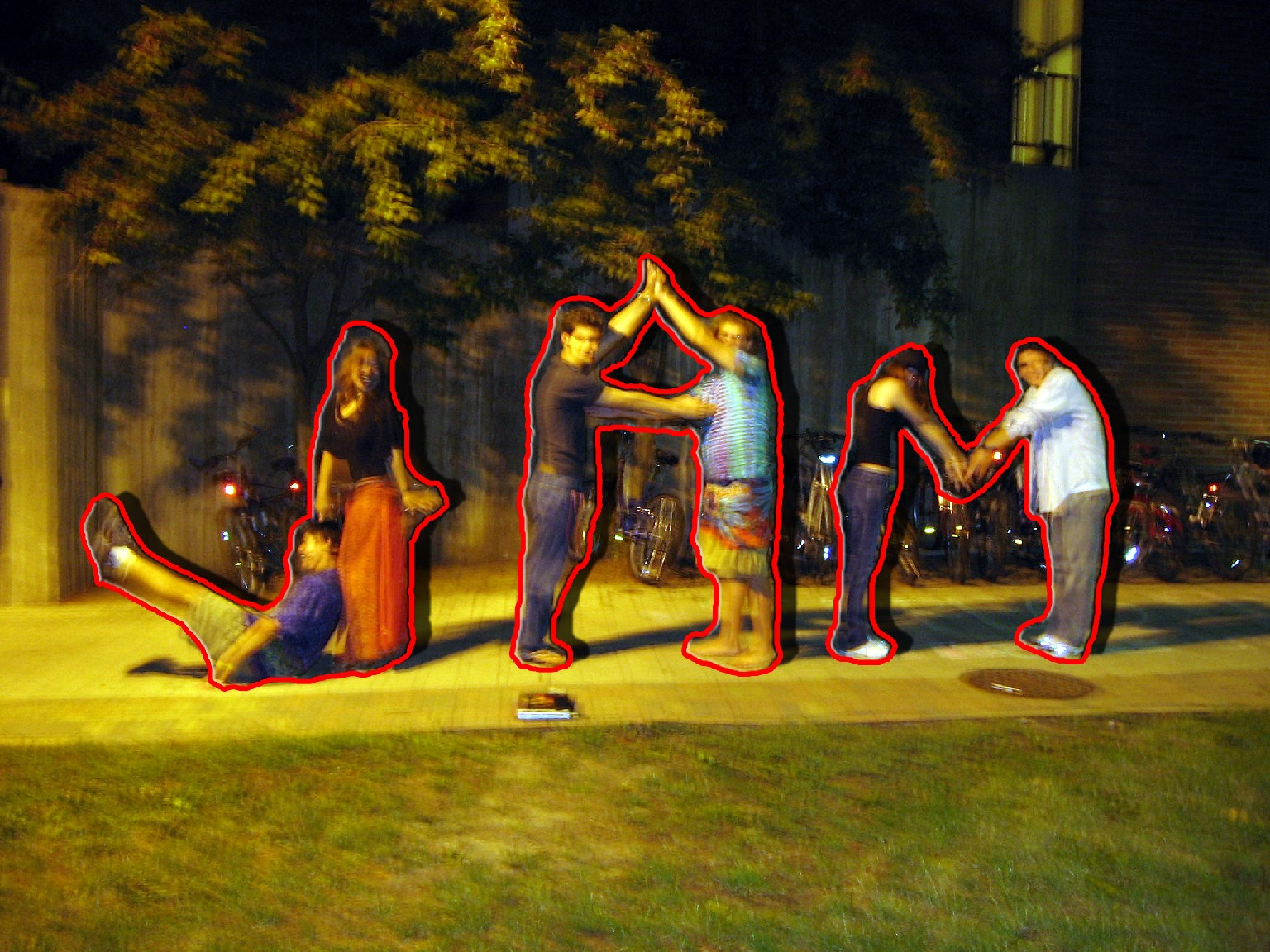
JAM, a musically-themed dormitory

Just About Music, also known as JAM, is a musically-themed program house currently located in Low Rise 9. Consistent with the low-rise style, the building contains four units, each comprising six suites, each of which contain a bathroom and four rooms (a double, a triple and two singles).

Founded during the 1987-1988 academic year, JAM was originally located on West Campus in Class of 1926 Hall, housing about 200 undergraduate students. This arrangement was superseded by the North Campus Initiative and the demolition of the University Halls. Currently JAM houses 144 undergraduate students, who call themselves "Jammies". There are four residential advisors, or RAs, who often plan programs for the residents. There is one Residence Hall Director (RHD) and many out-of-house members.

JAM is also home to three pianos, a practice room, and a drum set. The building contains a Performance Space, also called the "P-Space," complete with a sound system and stage lighting, which is used throughout the school term for concerts, programs, and rehearsals. The P-Space also doubles as a recording studio for those who wish to record their music, with a separate recording booth and drum room.

=== Latino Living Center ===
Founded in 1994, the Latino Living Center is located in Anna Comstock House, across the street from Risley Residential College. Every year, the Latino Living Center houses 56 residents from all over the world. Residents are not exclusively students with Latino heritage, since one of the goals of the program house is to give other students the opportunity to immerse themselves in Latino culture.

The LLC has numerous programs during the year. Every year, student organizations and fraternities hold events in the house in order to promote student activism. The LLC's main program is its Cafe con Leche Series, in which student organizations make a presentation of cultural, educational or political relevance for the event.

=== Loving House ===
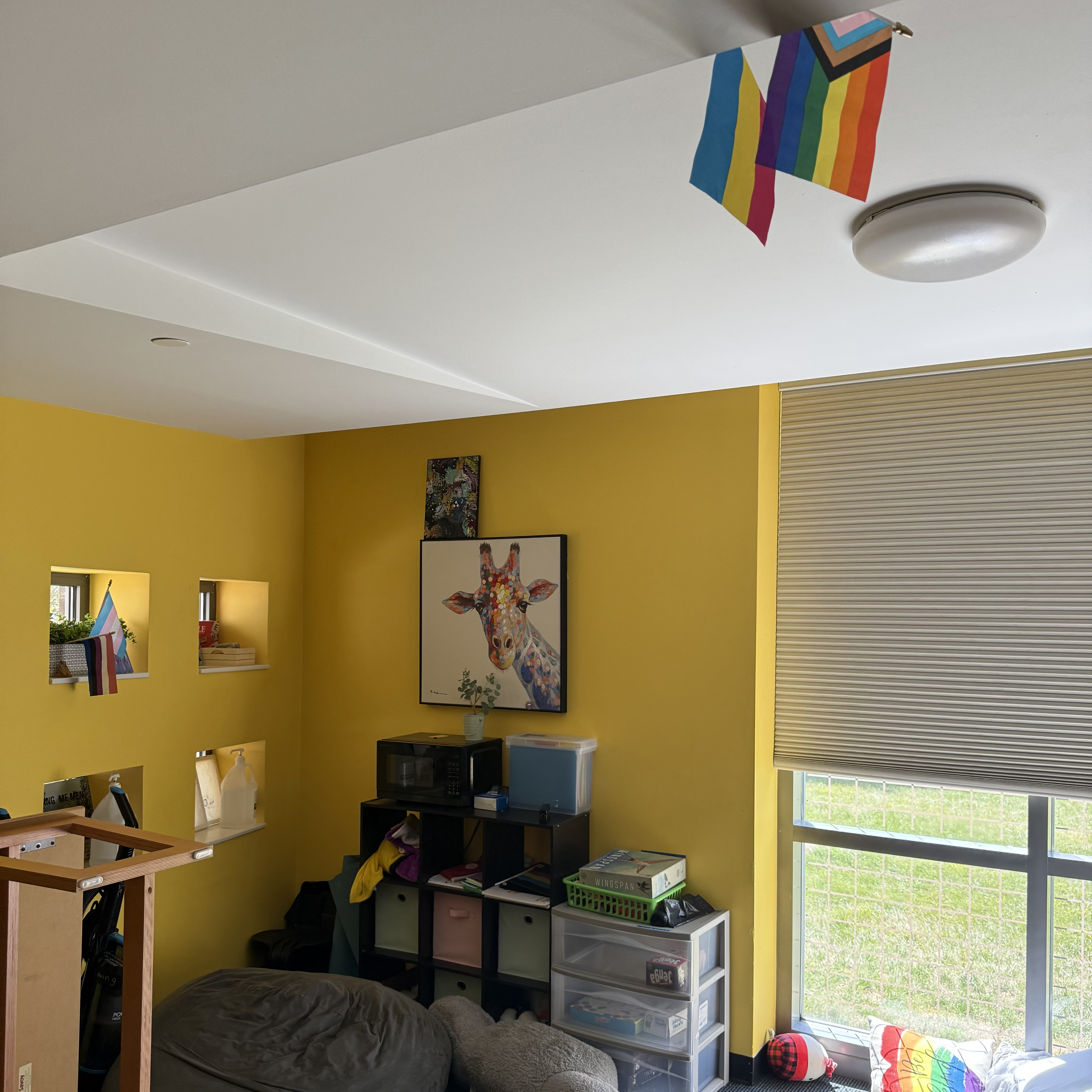
Loving Lounge

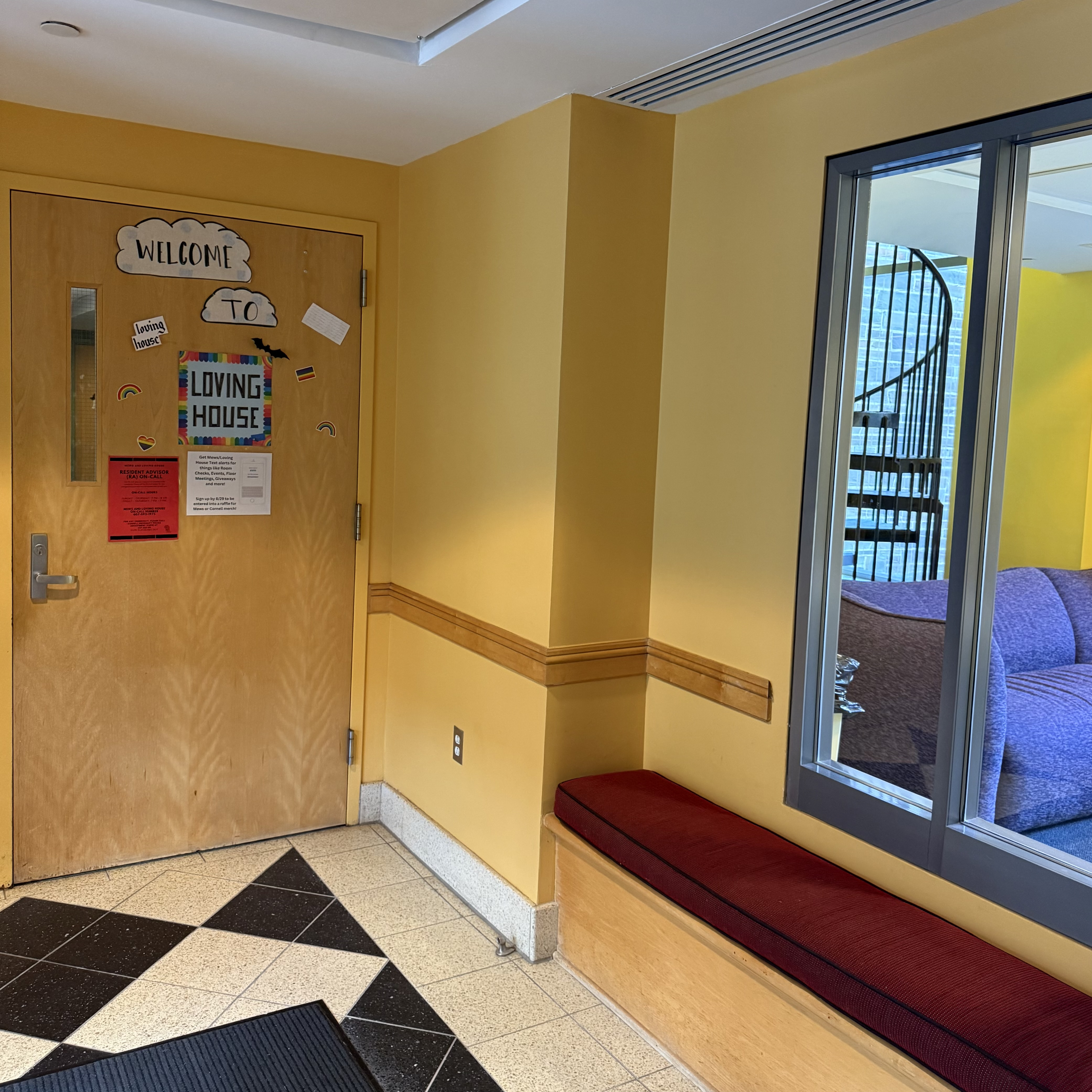
Entrance into Loving House, from the east wing of Mews Hall

Opened in 2019, the Loving House provides 30 beds and programming designed to create a supportive environment for LGBTQIA+ students. It is located on the first floor in the east side of Mews Hall. Like the rest of Mews Hall, it features pod-style hallways with three to five single and double rooms, as well as two all-gender bathrooms per pod. A recreational lounge is situated at the very end of the hall, with an additional TV lounge near the entrance. There is also a Loving House kitchen, located in the center wing of Mews Hall, separate from the main section of Loving House. The program house is named after the landmark Supreme Court case Loving v. Virginia. Loving House residents are sometimes referred to as "Lovies" or "Lovelies."

=== Multicultural Living Learning Unit ===
The Multicultural Living Learning Unit, was originally housed in the Class of '17 on West Campus. In 1999 McLLU was relocated to North Campus within Clara Dickson Hall. There are approximately 50 "McLLUies" - first year and upper level student residents. These students represent a global community of backgrounds and ethnic groups which are found at Cornell University. Its new North Campus location is ideal because it is near several convenient facilities including community centers, dining halls, convenience stores, recreational facility, gyms, and bus routes.

=== Ujamaa ===
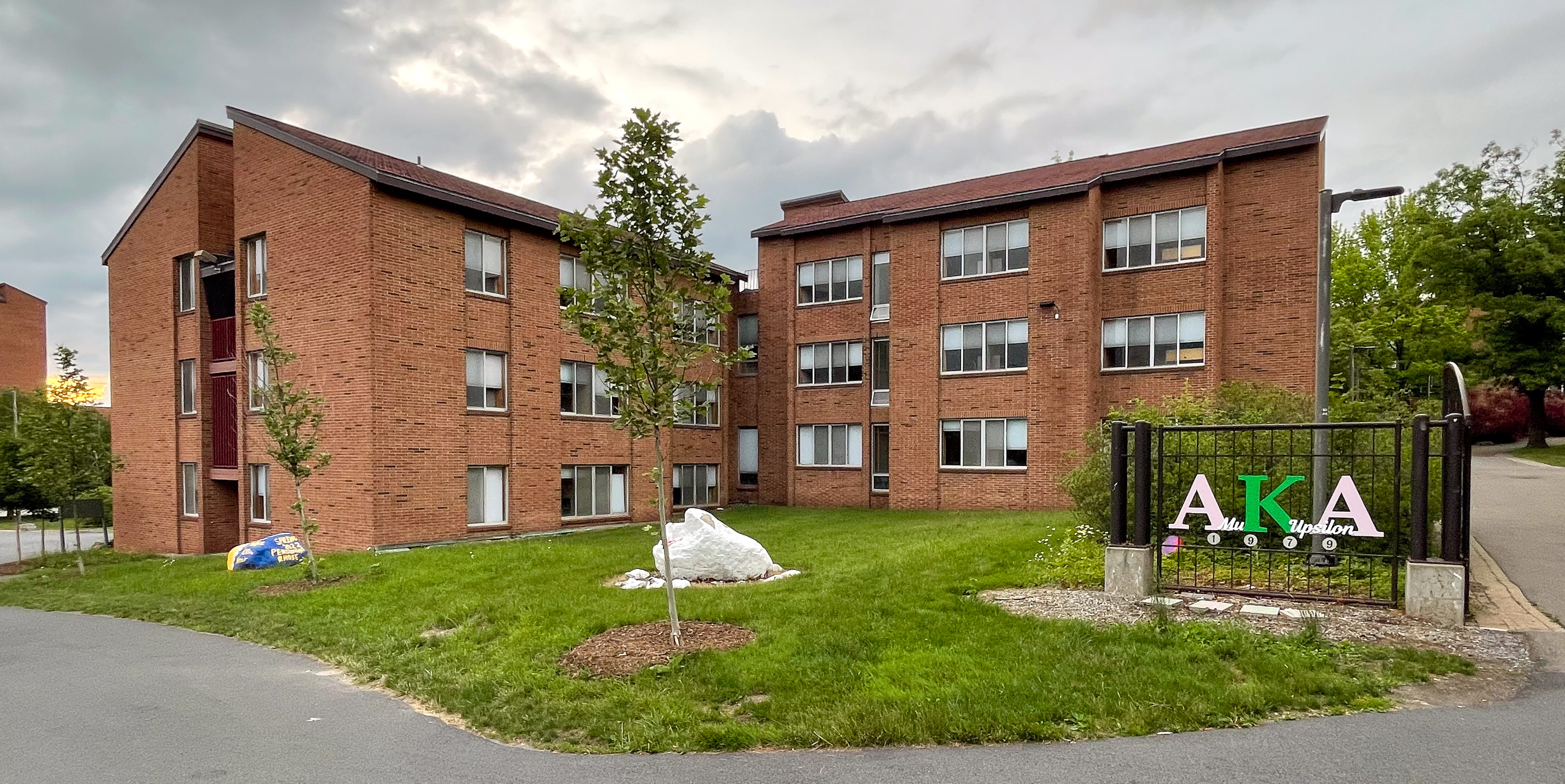
Ujamaa

Ujamaa, pronounced oo-ja-ma, houses 140 students, in a program house dedicated to allowing students to learn about the history and culture of black people in the United States, Africa, and the Caribbean.

== Hasbrouck Apartments ==
The Hasbrouck Apartments are a complex comprising 335 units for graduate and professional students, as well as non-traditional students and visiting scholars. Designed by Von Storch and Barkavage of Waverly, Pennsylvania, it was originally developed as a 246-unit mix of apartments for married students, becoming available in 1961, though it was later opened to unmarried upperclassmen.

== Townhouse Apartments ==
Originally known as the Townhouse Community, the Townhouses are a group of eight buildings supplying apartment-style living to approximately 300 students. Originally graduate housing, they were opened to freshmen as part of the 1998 residential initiative due to lack of capacity elsewhere; they will revert to upperlevel housing in 2024.

The Townhouses are nearly all arranged in pairs of two doubles. This is unique in that just four students share a bathroom and shower, kitchen, living room, and dining room. The Townhouse Community Center, located between the buildings, provides community events, mailboxes, a study room, laundry machines, and lounges. The eight units are labeled A through H, and each pair sits at opposite sides of four grassy quads.

== Small living units ==
North Campus and the adjacent areas of Cornell Heights and Cayuga Heights includes a number of other student residential structures, including those organized under the Cornell University Residence Plan of 1966. These include the following:

=== University-owned ===
- 302 Wait Avenue (cooperative)
- 308 Wait Terrace (cooperative)
- Prospect of Whitby (cooperative), 228 Wait Avenue
- Triphammer Cooperative, 150 Triphammer Road
- Wari House, 208 Dearborn Place
- Zeta Psi (fraternity), 534 Thurston Avenue (formerly Theta Xi)

=== Private ===
- Acacia ("Northcote," fraternity), 318 Highland Road
- Alpha Chi Omega (sorority), 210 Thurston Avenue
- Alpha Epsilon Phi (sorority), 435 Wyckoff Avenue
- Alpha Epsilon Pi ("Thurston Manor," fraternity), 140 Thurston Avenue
- Alpha Phi (sorority), 411 Thurston Avenue
- Alpha Phi Alpha (fraternity), 105 Westbourne Lane (formerly Tau Kappa Epsilon)
- Alpha Xi Delta (sorority), 40 Ridgewood Road (formerly Theta Chi)
- Beta Theta Pi ("Castle on the Rock," fraternity), 100 Ridgewood Road
- Chesterton House (Christian living center), 111-115 The Knoll (formerly Delta Phi Epsilon)
- Delta Chi ("The Knoll," fraternity), 102 The Knoll
- Delta Delta Delta (sorority), 118 Triphammer Road
- Delta Gamma (sorority), 117 Triphammer Road
- Kappa Delta (sorority), 109 Triphammer Road
- Kappa Delta Rho (fraternity), 312 Highland Road
- Kappa Kappa Gamma (sorority), 508 Thurston Avenue
- Phi Delta Theta (fraternity), 2 Ridgewood Road
- Phi Kappa Tau (fraternity), 106 The Knoll
- Pi Beta Phi (sorority), 330 Triphammer Road
- Pi Kappa Phi ("Greentrees," fraternity), 55 Ridgewood Road (formerly Phi Kappa Sigma)
- Seal and Serpent Society, 305 Thurston Avenue
- Sigma Chi ("Greystone," fraternity), 106 Cayuga Heights Road
- Sigma Delta Tau (sorority), 115 Ridgewood Road
- Zeta Beta Tau (fraternity), 1 Edgecliff Place

== Other facilities ==
=== 410 Thurston Avenue ===
The house at 410 Thurston Avenue was originally the fraternity house for Pi Lambda Phi. It was purchased in 1976 and housed various administrative offices, before being wholly occupied by the Undergraduate Admissions Office. The same year, it and Day Hall, the main administration building, were occupied by student protesters after the firing of a black financial aid officer, departing after an injunction was issued.

=== 626 Thurston Avenue ===
The Delta Delta Delta sorority house for many years, the house at 626 Thurston Avenue was acquired by the university, and in 1966 Alumni House was moved there from 3 East Avenue. The alumni affairs office and Cornell Alumni Association remained until 2010, when the remaining staff were moved to offices in downtown Ithaca, and the building became home to several student programs, including the Office of Minority Educational Affairs (OMEA), which had been in Barnes Hall; the Asian/Asian American Center and the African Latino Asian Native American Students Programming Board (ALANA), which previously in Willard Straight Hall; and the Lesbian, Gay, Bisexual, Transgender Resource Center and the Alumni-Student Mentoring Program, which had been in Caldwell Hall.

=== Africana Studies and Research Center ===
The Cornell Africana Studies and Research Center (ASRC) opened in 1969 at 320 Wait Avenue. Less than a year after the Willard Straight Hall Takeover, this building was destroyed by an arson fire, and the center was temporarily relocated to Low Rise 8 before moving to its present home at 310 Triphammer Road. The Center conducts research and teaching related to the peoples of the African diaspora and their links to the African continent and its people. Since 2011 it has been administered as a unit of the College of Arts and Sciences.

=== Appel Commons ===
Completed in 2002, the Robert J. & Helen Appel Commons became the second community center on North Campus. It contains North Star dining, a convenience store called Ezra's Emporium, a fitness center, and multipurpose rooms.

=== Fuertes Observatory ===
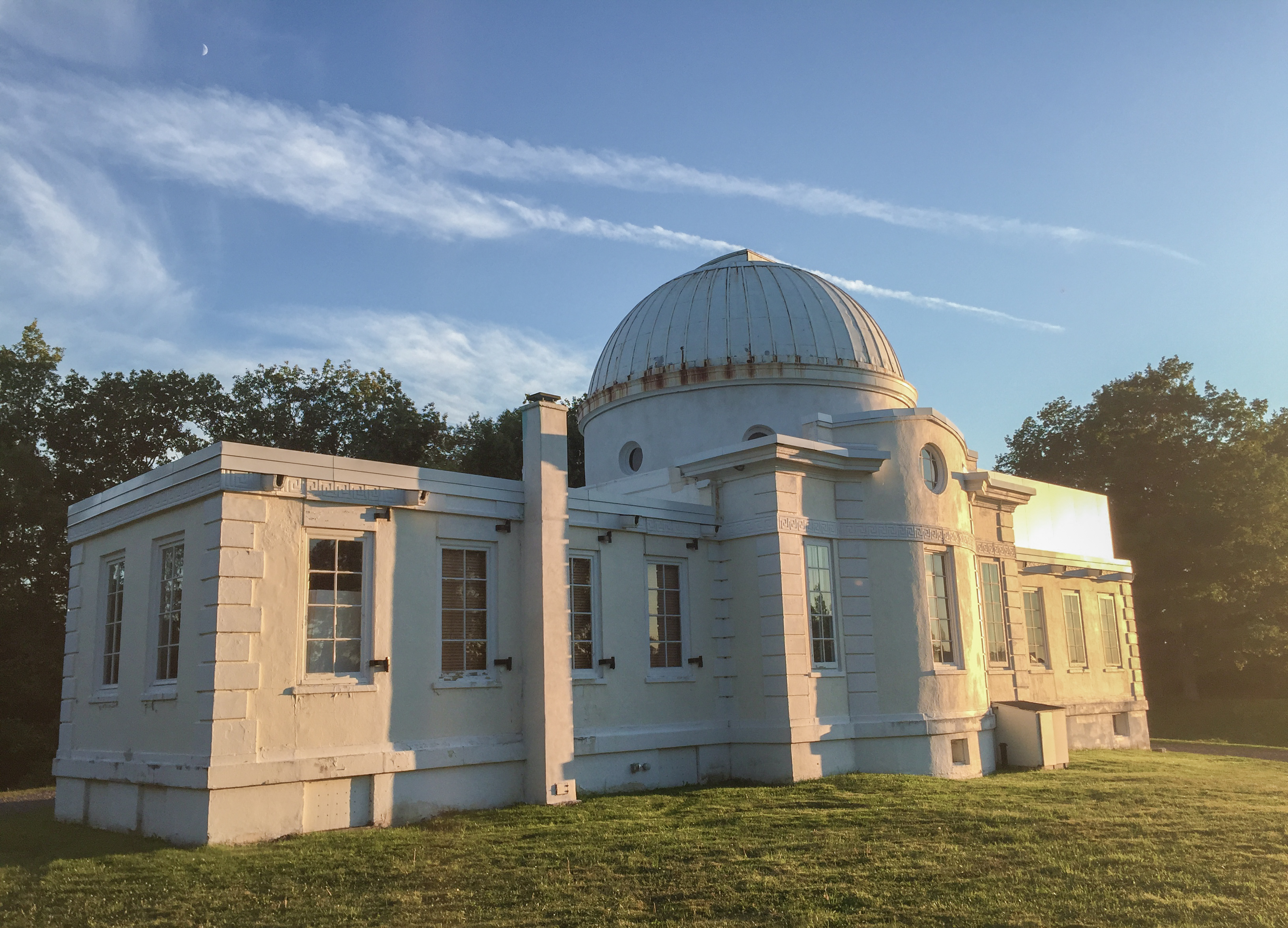
Fuertes Observatory was built on Cornell's North Campus in 1917 and is open to the public every Friday night.

Fuertes Observatory, named for astronomy professor and dean of civil engineering Estevan Antonio Fuertes who had championed it, was completed in the fall of 1917. Designed by architecture professor LP Burnham, it occupies a knoll just to the north of Beebe Lake. The observatory is still used for introductory astronomy labs, as well as for public viewing nights on clear Fridays.

=== Helen Newman Hall ===
Helen Newman Hall opened in 1963 to serve as the women's gymnasium, and housed the women's physical education program.

=== Noyes Lodge ===
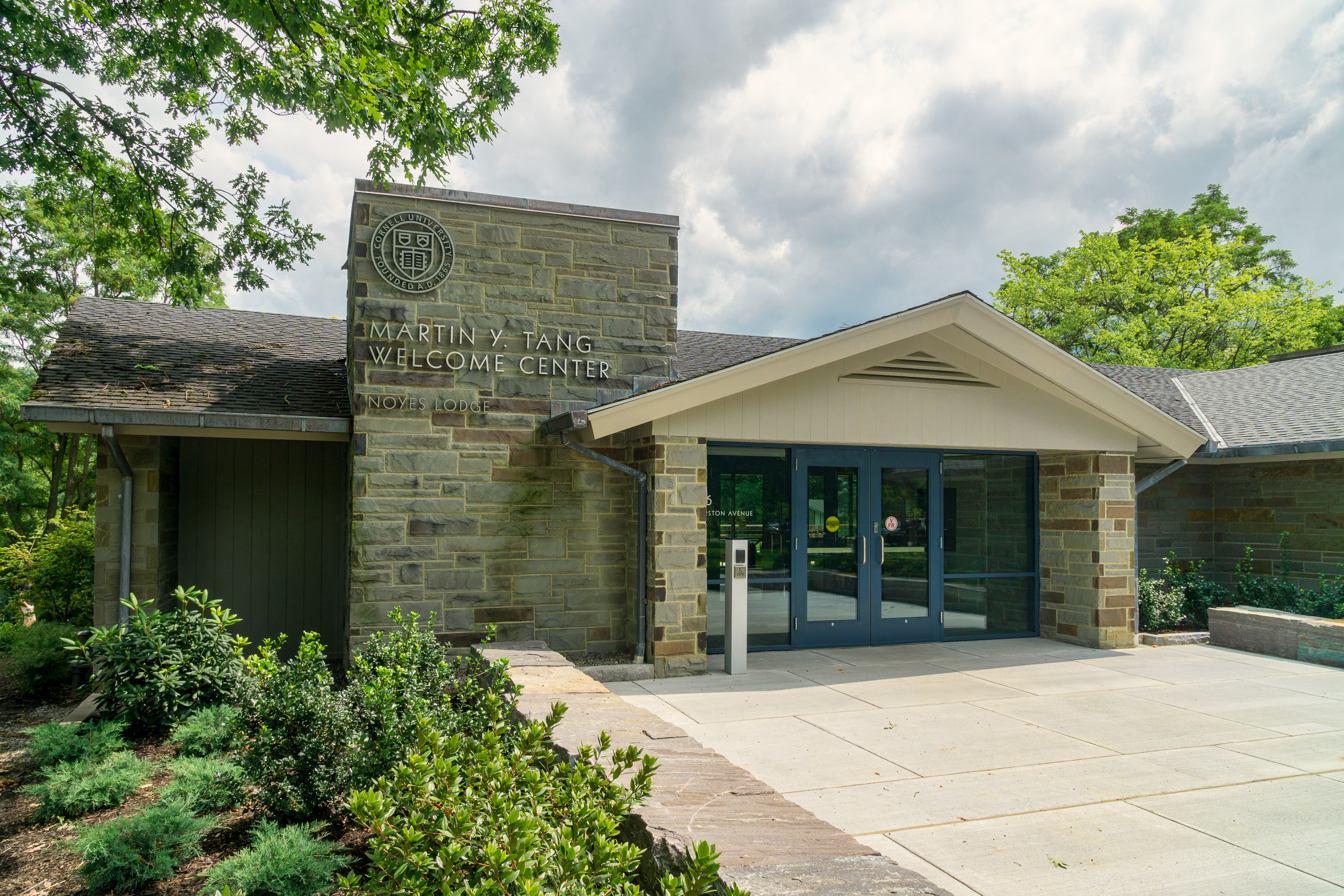
Martin Y. Tang Welcome Center at Noyes Lodge opened 2018.

Noyes Lodge, at 616 Thurston Avenue, was originally built in 1958 as a dining hall. It contained the Pancake House and the Pick-Up, a small grocery, in the 1970s and ’80s. It also contained the Language Resource Center. In 2018, Noyes was completely renovated to be the home of the Tang Welcome Center, the first official welcome center at Cornell. The center, which overlooks Beebe Lake, contains space for exhibitions about the University's history and mission, and serves as a gathering point for visitors and the starting point for campus tours.

=== Robert Purcell Community Center ===
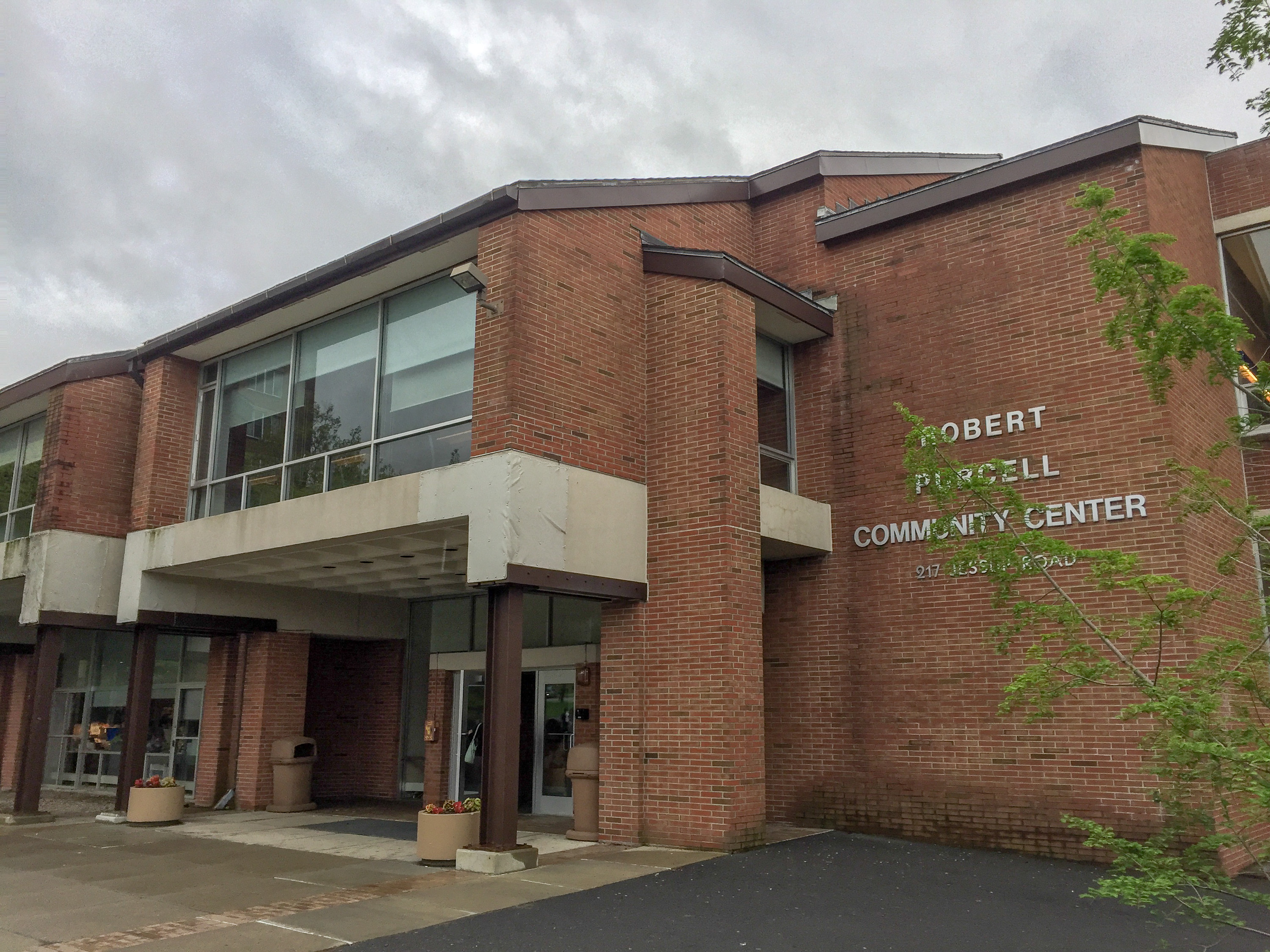
Robert Purcell Community Center

The North Campus Union, as it was originally known, opened in 1971 to serve students living on North Campus, notably in the newly Constructed High Rises and Low Rises. The facility included a dining hall, mailroom, game room, TV lounges, and performance space. In 1982, it was renamed in honor of Robert Purcell of the Class of 1932, who had been chairman of the university Board of Trustees during the tumultuous late 1960s and early 1970s.

In 2021, as renovations to Balch Hall were getting underway, the Carol Tatkon Center was moved to RPCC. The dining hall closed the following year with the opening of a replacement facility in Toni Morrison Hall.

=== Robert Trent Jones Golf Course ===
The Robert Trent Jones Golf Course, designed by Cornell alumnus Robert Trent Jones, is situated northeast of North Campus. The first 9 holes opened in 1940.

== Former structures ==
- 10 Sisson Place, demolished (formerly Chi Omega)
- 306 Highland Road, redeveloped (formerly Tau Epsilon Phi)
- Johnny Parson Club / Japes Lodge, demolished 2018 - Named for the engineering professor who organized the first ice hockey team, this was a Tudor-style structure built in 1922 for the Cornell Athletic Association to support ice skaters on Beebe Lake. The name was later reduced to "J-P's" and eventually "Japes." It fell out of use with the opening of Lynah Rink; the upper levels were demolished by 1960, storage areas used by Cornell Outdoor Education and the Cornell Outing Club until 2012.
