= New York State College of Agriculture and Life Sciences at Cornell University =

Agricultural college of Cornell University

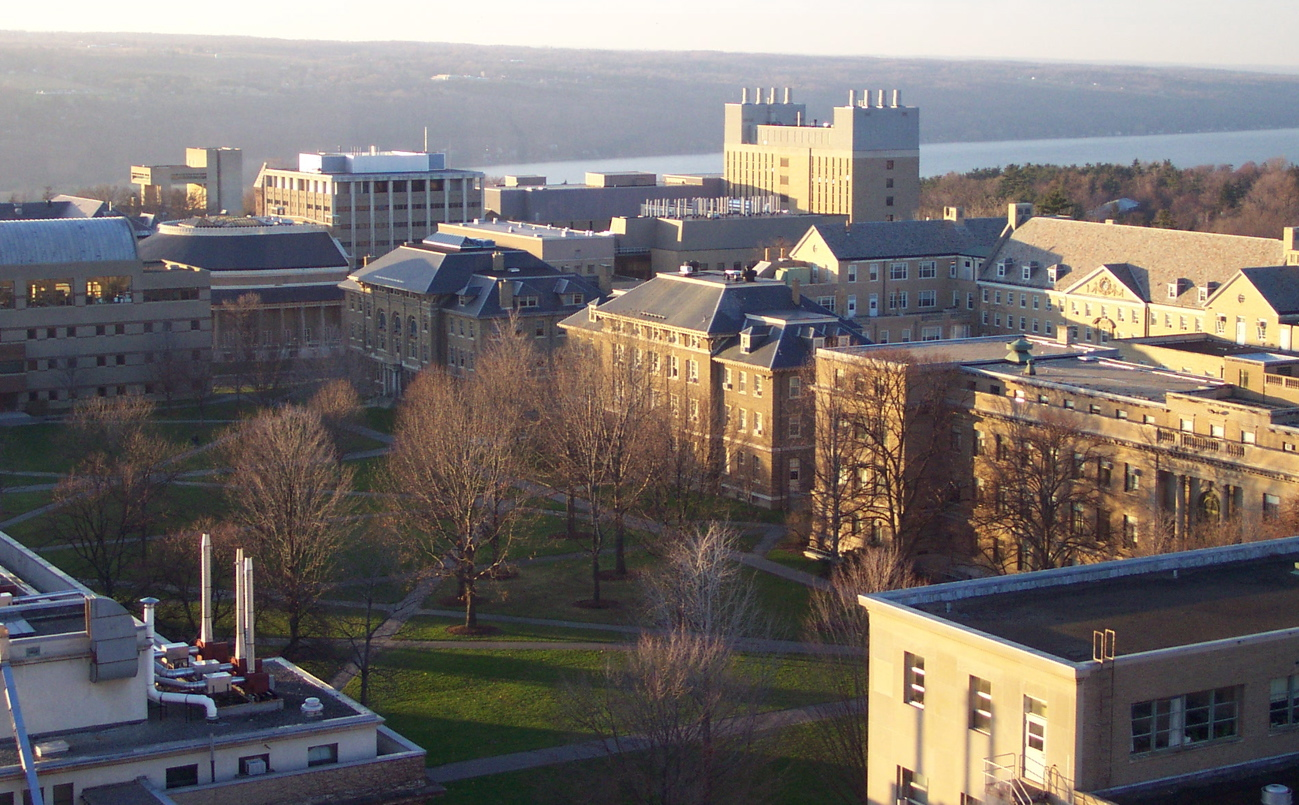
- Agriculture Quad viewed from Bradfield Hall
- Type: Statutory
- Established: 1874; 152 years ago
- Dean: Benjamin Z. Houlton
- Undergraduates: 3,390
- Postgraduates: 1,100
- Location: Ithaca, New York, U.S. 42.44824°N 76.47938°W
- Website: cals.cornell.edu

The New York State College of Agriculture and Life Sciences at Cornell University (CALS or Ag School) is one of Cornell University's four statutory colleges, and is the only agricultural college in the Ivy League. With enrollment of approximately 3,390 undergraduate and 1,100 graduate students, CALS is Cornell's second-largest undergraduate college and the third-largest college of its kind in the United States.

Though part of Cornell, a private Ivy League university, CALS receives funding through The State University of New York to administer New York's cooperative extension program alongside the College of Human Ecology as an essential component of Cornell University's land-grant mission. CALS runs the New York State Agricultural Experiment Station in Geneva, New York, as well as other facilities across New York State.

In 2007–08, CALS total budget (excluding the Geneva Station) is $283 million, with $96 million coming from tuition and $52 million coming from state appropriations. The Geneva Station budget was an additional $25 million.

== Academic programs ==
CALS offers more than 20 majors, each with a focus on Life Sciences, Applied Social Sciences, Environmental Sciences and Agriculture and Food. CALS undergraduate programs lead to a Bachelor of Science degree in one of 22 different majors including Agricultural Sciences, Animal Science, Atmospheric Science, Biological Engineering, Biological Sciences, Biology and Society, Biometry & Statistics, Communication, Earth & Atmospheric Sciences, Entomology, Environment & Sustainability, Environmental Engineering, Food Science, Global & Public Health Sciences, Global Development, Information Science, Landscape Architecture, Nutritional Sciences, Plant Sciences, and Viticulture & Enology. CALS also offers an Interdisciplinary degree option, where students can create their own major that aligns with their future career goals. Additionally, CALS also offers graduate degrees in various fields of study, including the M.A.T., M.L.A., M.P.S., M.S., and PhD

Deans of New York State College of Agriculture and Life Sciences
Liberty Hyde Bailey	1903–1913
Beverly T. Galloway	1914–1916
Albert Russell Mann	1917–1931
Carl Edwin Ladd	1931–1943
William Irving Myers	1943–1959
Charles E. Palm	1959–1972
W. Keith Kennedy	1972–1978
David L. Call	1978–1995
Daryl B. Lund	1995–2000
Susan Armstrong Henry	2000–2010
Kathryn J. Boor	2010–2020
Benjamin Z. Houlton	2020–Present

== Rankings and admission ==
Cornell's College of Agriculture and Life Sciences is the most renowned institution in its field. In 2025, it is ranked 1st in the "Food and Nutrition" and "Agricultural Sciences" sectors of Niche.

With an admission rate of 11.5% for the fall of 2018, admission into the college is extremely competitive and in the middle relative to the other colleges at Cornell.

== Additional programs and facilities ==
=== The Agriculture Quadrangle ===
1. Comstock Hall; 2. Caldwell Hall; 3. Warren Hall; 4. Mann Library; 5. Plant Science Building; 6. Green House; 7. Kennedy Hall; 8. Roberts Hall; 11. Ward Center

The Agriculture Quadrangle (Ag Quad) is a grouping of buildings dedicated to programs offered by the College of Agriculture and Life Sciences. The oldest building on the quad is Caldwell Hall (1913). The Plant Science Building (1931), and Warren Hall (1931), flank the art deco style Albert R. Mann Library (1952). A newer Kennedy and Roberts Halls replaced the original 1906 building, and The Computing and Communications Center (1912) was formerly Comstock Hall). These buildings are owned by New York State, which pays for their construction and maintenance.

The college operates extension programs through the New York State Agricultural Experiment Station (NYSAES) in Geneva, New York, in 20 buildings, including the Barton Laboratory Greenhouse and Sutton Road Solar Farm (a 2-megawatt energy facility that offsets nearly 40 percent of NYSAES annual electricity demands), on 130 acres (0.5 km^{2}) and over 700 acres (2.8 km^{2}) of test plots and other land parcels used to conduct horticultural research and also substations: the Vineyard Research Laboratory in Fredonia, Hudson Valley Laboratory in Highland, and Long Island Horticultural Research Laboratory in Riverhead.

The Dilmun Hill Student Farm is located in Ithaca, New York is a student-run farm facility operated according to sustainable agricultural practices.

The Social Media Lab, is part of the college's communications department. In this modern research laboratory, faculty supervise undergraduate and graduate research focusing on human interaction in CMC and online communities, including the investigation of social phenomena, such as disclosure or deception among users of social media computer applications, such as Facebook, Grindr. Studies examine human behavior, personal experience, and human interaction in the digital realm along the dimensions of language processes, perception, self-representation, and interpersonal interaction. In 2009, The Social Media Lab coined the term, the Butler Lie, a reference to factually untrue verbal communication used to politely initiate or end an instant message conversation, such as "Gotta go, boss is coming!" These statements buffer the otherwise negative experience of social rejection or ostracism.

The recently established Rich's Food Safety Lab was made possible by a donation from frozen food industry giant Rich Products. The laboratory aims to engages in critical food safety research and the education of the next generation of food safety leaders.

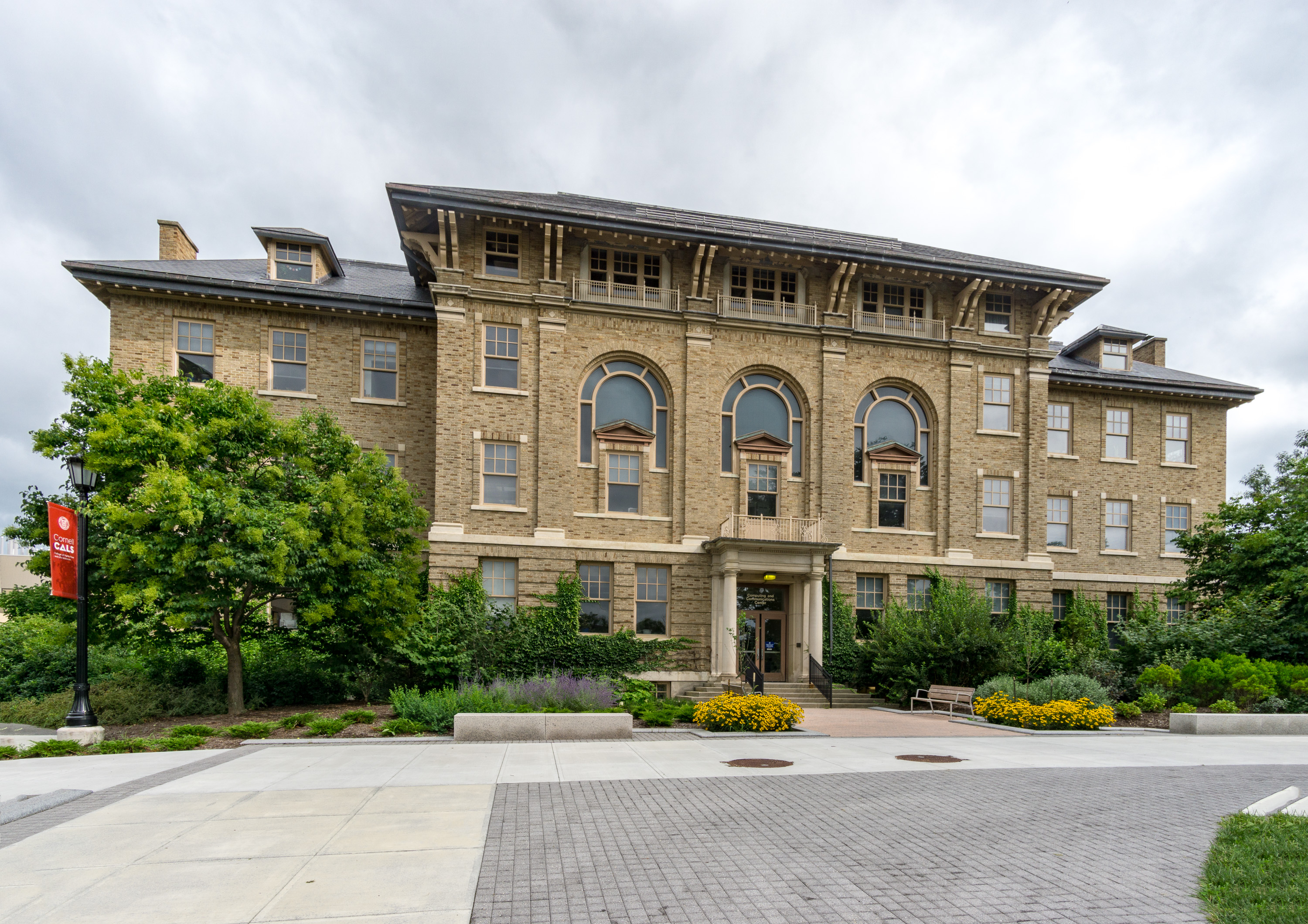
Comstock Hall

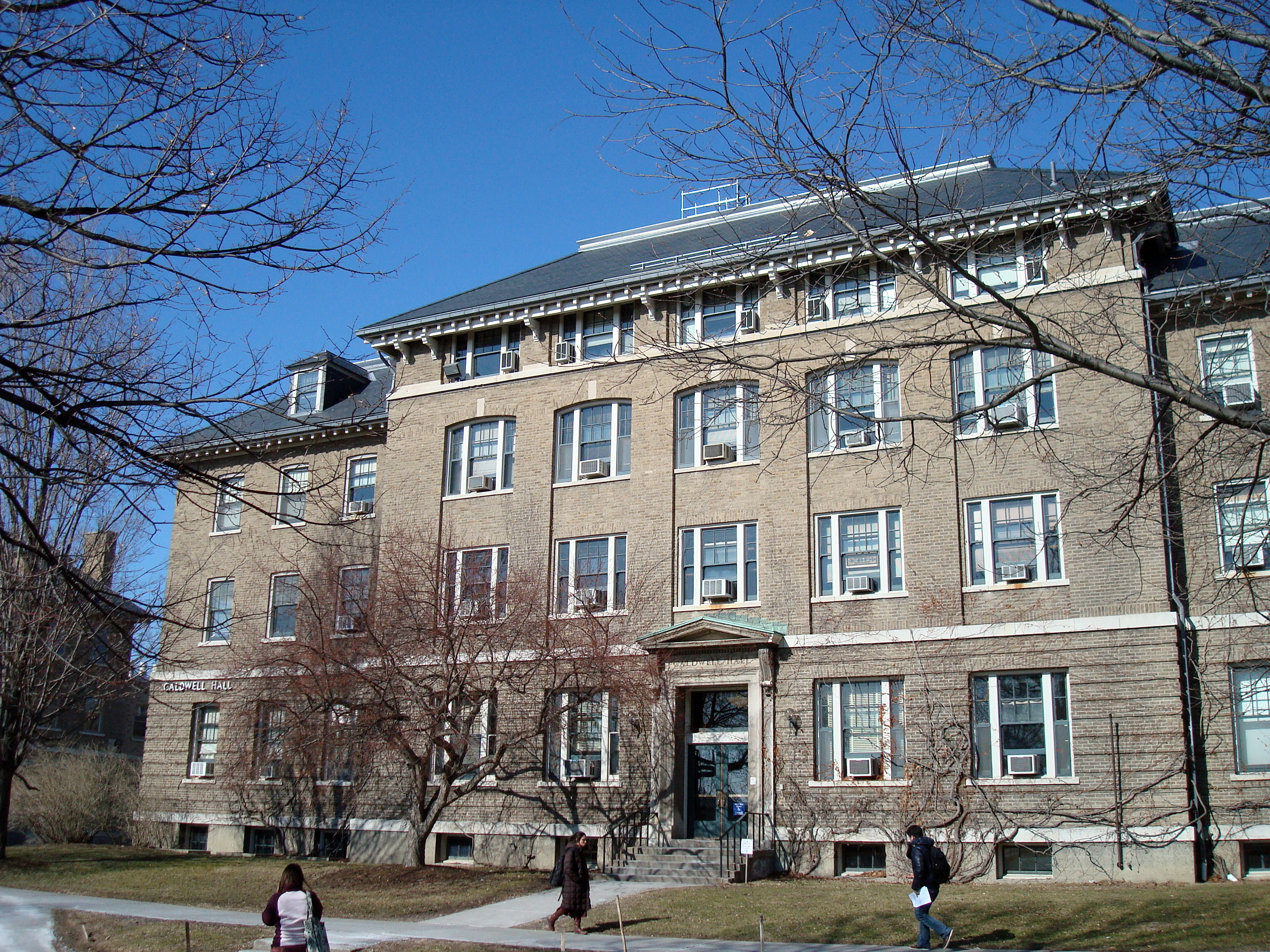
Caldwell Hall

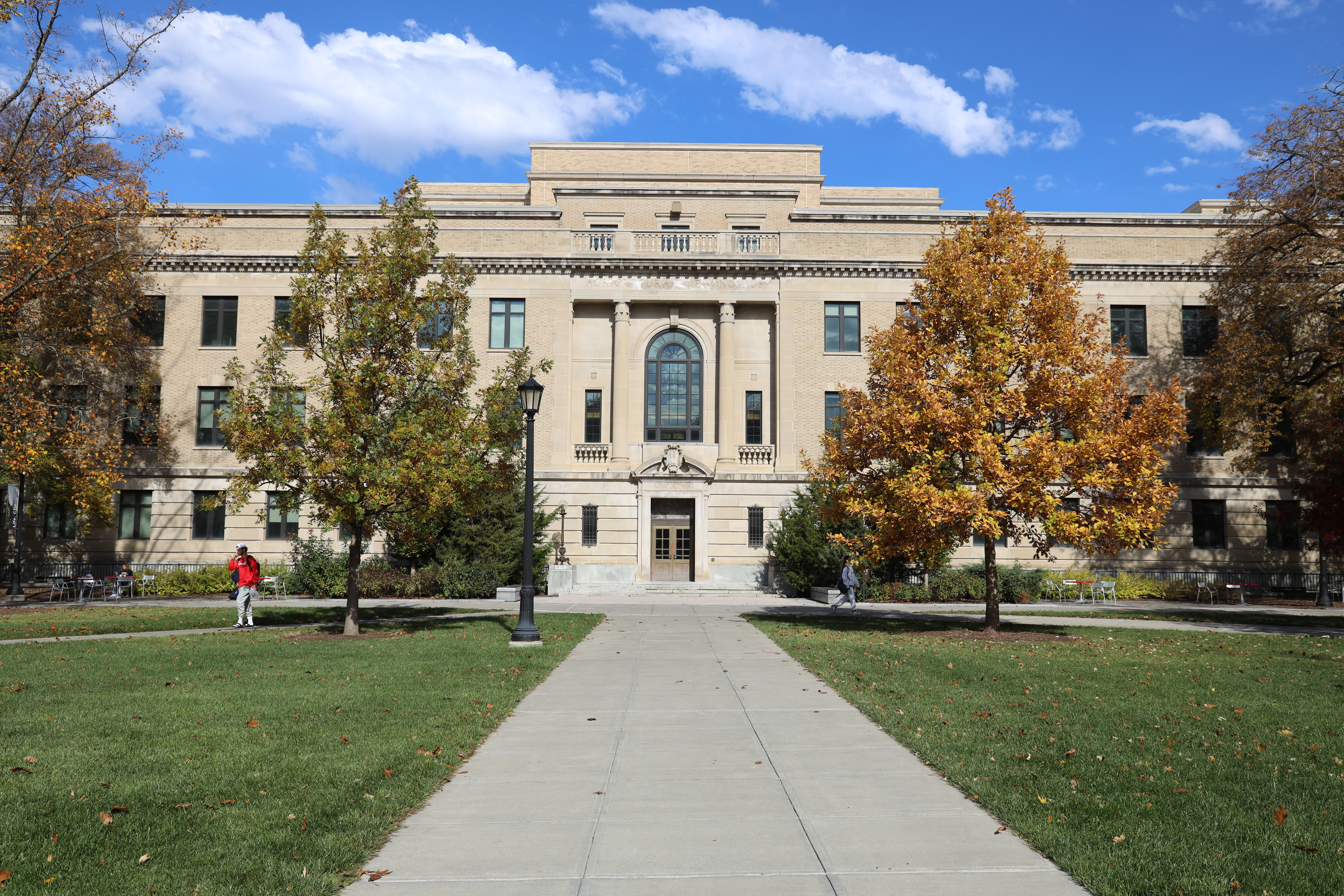
Warren Hall

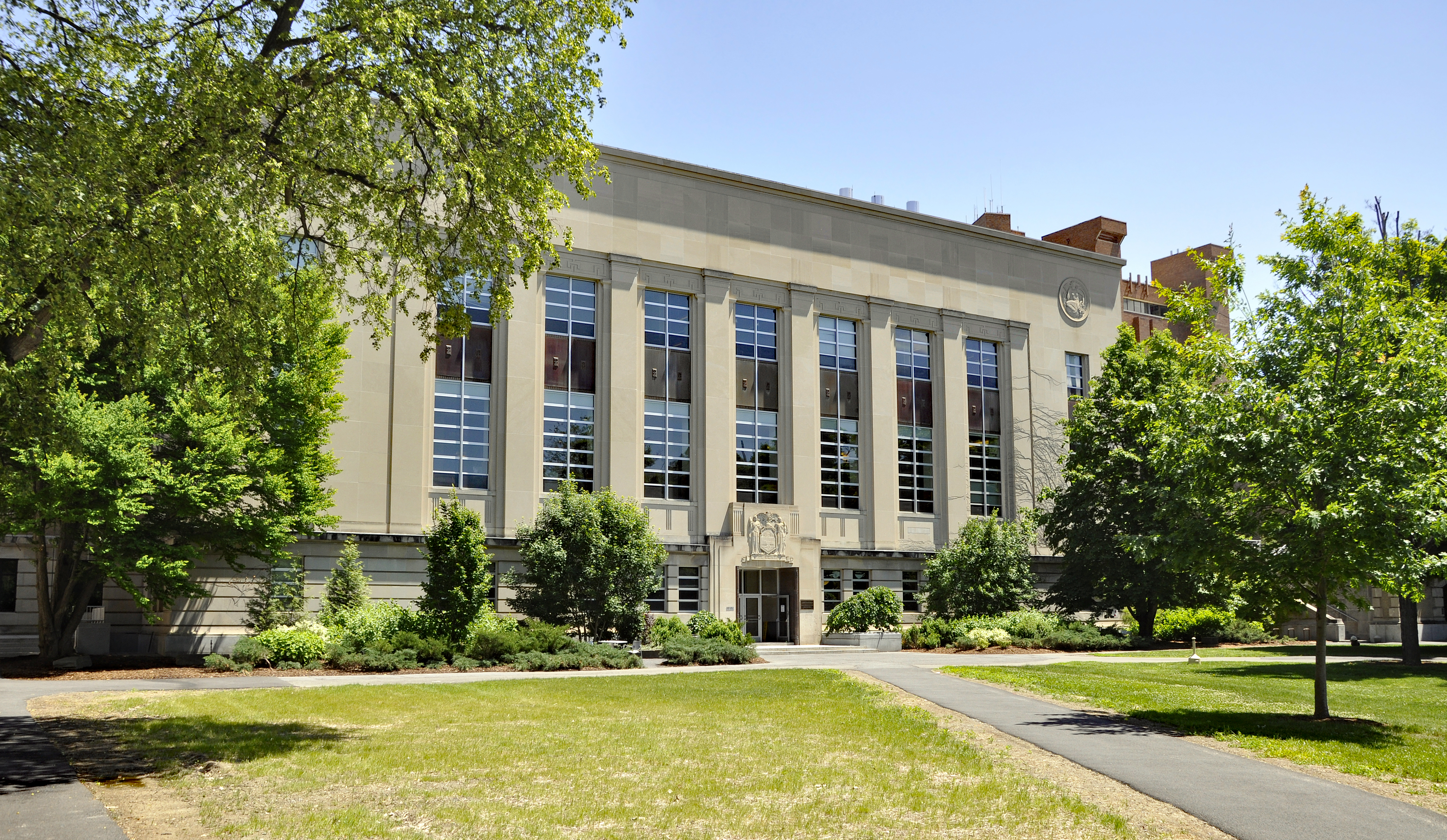
Mann Library

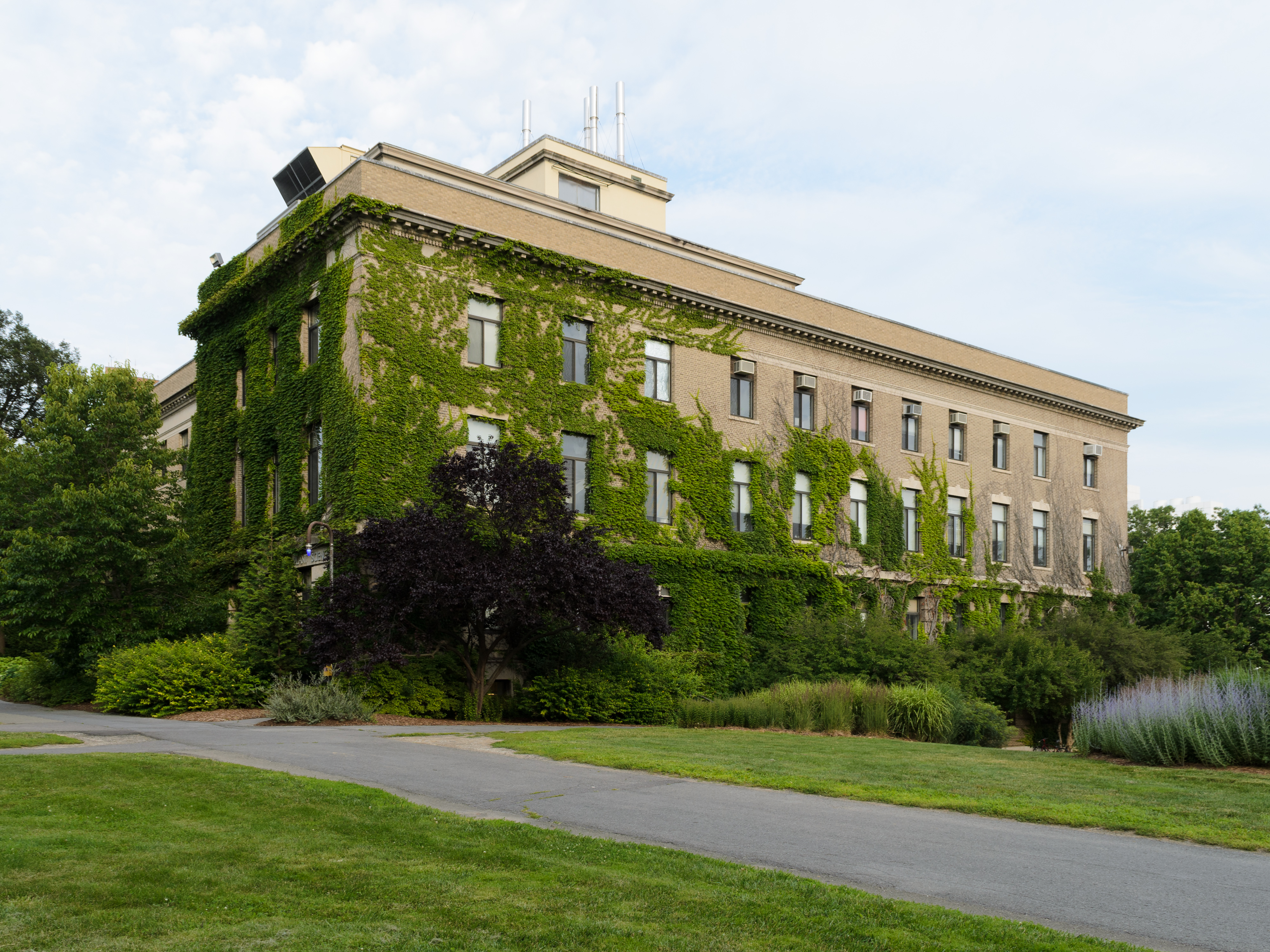
Plant Science Building

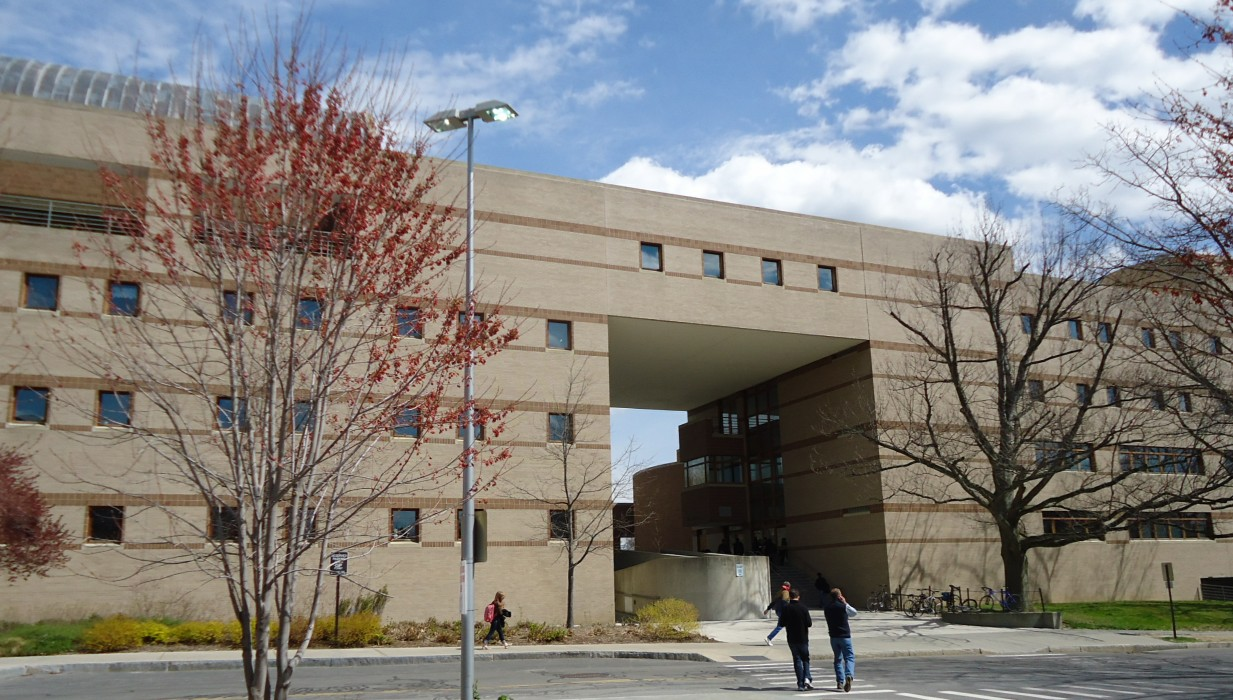
Kennedy-Roberts Hall

== History ==
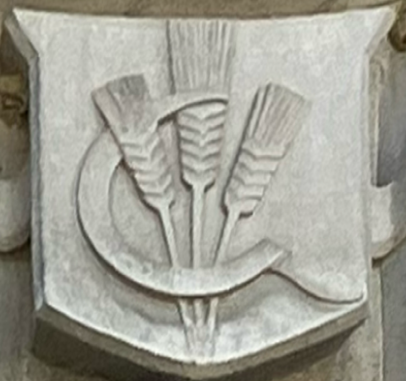
On the left, the shied of the College of Agriculture as seen at the entrance of Willard Straight Hall. On the right, the banner of CALS used at commencement ceremonies.

Cornell's first president, Andrew Dickson White, had little enthusiasm for agricultural education, and the Board of Trustees were likewise without much enthusiasm. Agriculture could not be ignored, however, because Ezra Cornell was deeply committed, and the provisions of the Morrill Land Grant Act required it. After much difficulty, George Chapman Caldwell was recruited in 1867 as Professor of Chemistry (Agricultural Chemistry). He was the very first professor of what was to become the Cornell University.

The university opened in September 1868 with professor Caldwell, the nominal leader of a group of three professors with interests touching upon agriculture. In addition to Caldwell, there was Albert N. Prentiss, professor of botany (with some reference to crops), and Dr. James Law, professor of veterinary medicine. The Faculty of Agriculture consisted of this informal group of three and a professor of agriculture of the moment.

The arrival of Isaac P. Roberts, as professor of agriculture, from Iowa Agricultural College, in 1874, finally brought credibility to agriculture at Cornell. During the period of 1879–1887, Cornell president Charles Kendall Adams gradually changed the Trustees seemingly hostility toward agriculture. In June 1888, the "informal" departments, including agriculture taught by Isaac Roberts, agricultural chemistry taught by George Caldwell, botany taught by Albert Prentiss, entomology taught by Henry Comstock, and veterinary medicine taught by James Law, were combined to form the Cornell College of Agriculture.

Established in 1874 as the Department of Agriculture, the department became a college in 1888. Also in June 1888, horticulture, which had played a minor role in botany until it was discontinued by the trustees in 1880, was reestablished as an independent department in the college, upon the recruitment of Liberty Hyde Bailey as professor and department head. Roberts was appointed Director of the college and dean of its faculty while retaining his role as professor of agriculture and heading a department of agriculture within the college of the same name.

=== Establishment of the New York State College of Agriculture ===
In 1904, eminent botanist and horticulturist Liberty Hyde Bailey, along with New York State farmers, convinced the New York Legislature to financially support the agriculture college. Legislation establishing the New York State College of Agriculture at Cornell passed the state legislature and was signed by the governor in May 1904. The legislation passed in spite of ″violent″ opposition and intense lobbying led by Chancellor James Roscoe Day of Syracuse University acting for Syracuse and six other universities and colleges in New York.

The college made discoveries and disseminated results from other schools, especially regarding insect control, fertilizers, breeding, veterinary medicine, cultivation, and farm management.

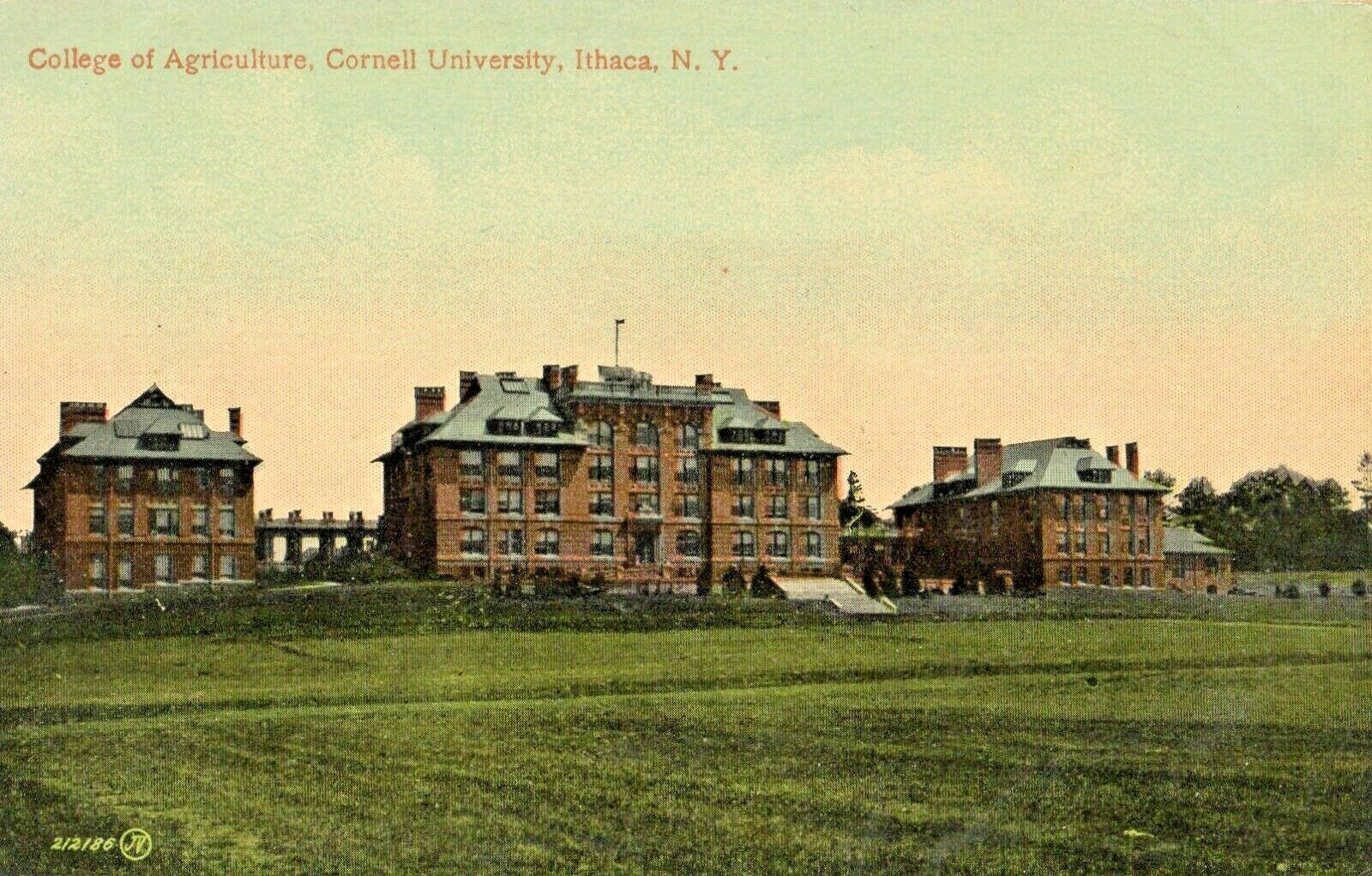
Stone Hall, Roberts Hall, and East Roberts Hall were the first buildings of the New York State College of Agriculture

The legislation provided $125,000 for the construction of a new building for the college. The building was constructed in three parts to comply with the act's restriction on spending for a single building. These were Stone Hall, Roberts Hall, and East Roberts Hall. Named for dean Isaac P. Roberts, the buildings were built in 1905–1906 along Tower Road. East Roberts served as the new Dairy Building, as the old Dairy Building was merged into Goldwin Smith Hall. The three buildings were determined in 1973 to be decrepit, and despite being listed on the U.S. National Register of Historic Places in 1984, Cornell had them demolished in 1988. Kennedy-Roberts Hall was built in 1989 to replace Roberts-Stone Halls.

The college changed its name from the New York State College of Agriculture to the New York State College of Agriculture and Life Sciences in 1971.

=== Absorbing the College of Forestry ===
In 1898, the State Legislature established a separate New York State College of Forestry at Cornell. However, the school ran into political controversy, and the Governor vetoed its annual appropriation in 1903. In 1910, Liberty Hyde Bailey, the Dean of Cornell's Agriculture College, succeeded in having what remained of the Forestry College transferred to his school. At his request, in 1911, the legislature appropriated $100,000 to construct a building to house the new Forestry Department on the Cornell campus, which Cornell later named Fernow Hall. That Forestry Department continues today as the Department of Natural Resources and the Environment. In 1927, Cornell established a 1,639-acre (6.63 km2) research forest south of Ithaca, the Arnot Woods.

=== Home economics ===
In 1900, the college began offering a reading course for farm women. In 1907, the Department of Home Economics was created within college. In 1919, the Department of Home Economics became a school within the Agriculture College. Finally, in 1925, the Home Economics department became a separate college, although both colleges continued to work together to provide cooperative extension services.

== Notable alumni ==
- Robert C. Baker, inventor of the chicken nugget and turkey hot dog;
- Jane Brody, The New York Times health and wellness writer (1962)
- Vera Charles, mycologist and USDA expert
- Bryan Colangelo, former general manager of the Philadelphia 76ers, Toronto Raptors and Phoenix Suns of the National Basketball Association (NBA).
- Frederick Vernon Coville, Chief Botanist USDA and work on blueberries.
- Jon Daniels, general manager of the Texas Rangers
- Arthur Rose Eldred, America's first Eagle Scout, American agricultural official and executive;
- William F. Friedman, Geneticist turned WWII code breaker
- Barbara McClintock, plant geneticist, Nobel Laureate in Physiology and Medicine;
- Beth Newlands Campbell, president of Rexall Drugstore
- Keith Olbermann, sports and political commentator and writer.
- Gregory Goodwin Pincus, Hormonal contraception, the pill.

== See also ==
- New York State College of Forestry
- Agriculture in New York
