= Roberts Hall (Ithaca, New York) =

Building at Cornell University (1906–1990)

- U.S. National Register of Historic Places
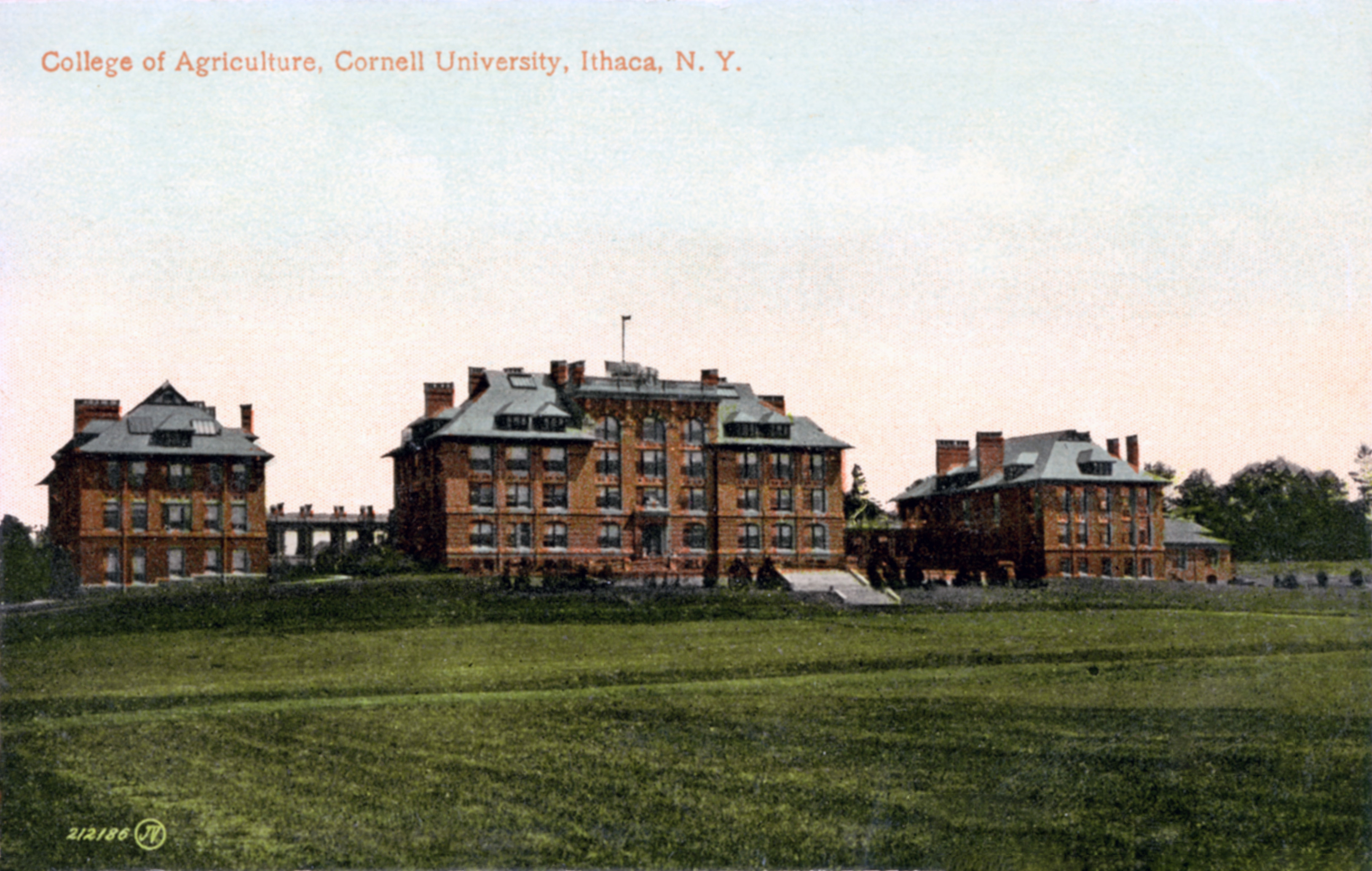
- Stone Hall, Roberts Hall, and East Roberts Hall were the first buildings of the New York State College of Agriculture

- Location within New York Location within the United States
- Location: Cornell University campus, Ithaca, New York
- Coordinates: 42°26′55″N 76°28′44″W
- Built: 1905-1906
- Architect: George L. Heins, Morris Kantrowitz,
- Architectural style: Beaux Arts, Renaissance
- Demolished: 1988
- MPS: New York State College of Agriculture TR
- NRHP reference No.: 84003191
- Added to NRHP: September 24, 1984

Roberts Hall was the first building of the New York State College of Agriculture at Cornell University, built 1905–1906, and demolished July 1990. A second building of that name was built in 1990.

== Original building ==
New York state legislation provided $125,000 for the construction of a building for the newly designated New York State College of Agriculture. The building was constructed in three parts to comply with the act's restriction on spending for a single building. These were Stone Hall, Roberts Hall, and East Roberts Hall, named for director of the College of Agriculture from 1874 to 1903, Isaac Phillips Roberts. The trio of buildings were built in 1905-1906 along Tower Road. East Roberts served as the new Dairy Building, as the old Dairy Building was merged into Goldwin Smith Hall. The three buildings were determined in 1973 to be decrepit, and despite being listed on the U.S. National Register of Historic Places in 1984, the State University of New York with the approval of Cornell, had them demolished in 1988 over the protest of local preservationists. Kennedy-Roberts Hall was built in 1989 to replace Roberts-Stone Halls.

The 1906 building is still listed on the National Register, apparently erroneously as nothing remains of the building. East Roberts Hall and Stone Hall are similarly listed.

=== Condemnation and demolition ===
In 1973, Franzen and Associates, the architectural firm that was designing Cornell's statutory college buildings at that time, conducted a study indicating that Roberts, East Roberts, Stone, Caldwell and Comstock Halls were unsafe and should be condemned. Franzen concluded that it would cost $14 million to renovate the five buildings and that it would be cheaper to tear them down and replace them with new buildings, presumably designed by Franzen. (Ironically, as of 2010, Caldwell and Comstock Halls are still in use, but another Franzen-designed building, the north wing of Martha Van Rensselaer Hall, had to be demolished as structurally unsound.) By 1978, the cost of demolishing the five buildings and building two replacements had escalated to $18 million. In response, two groups, Historic Ithaca and a student-group called the "Ag Quad Preservation Society" applied to list the five buildings on the National Register and sought to protect them under a newly enacted Ithaca historic preservation ordinance. Just before Historic Ithaca could gain a court injunction to stop the demolition of Roberts, East Roberts and Stone Halls, Cornell began the demolition of Stone Hall in February 1986. The State of New York renovated Caldwell and sold Comstock back to Cornell for use as a computer center.

Citing the legal precedent of Stone Hall, the State University officials proceeded with the demolition of Roberts Hall and East Roberts Hall in July 1990.

=== Gallery ===
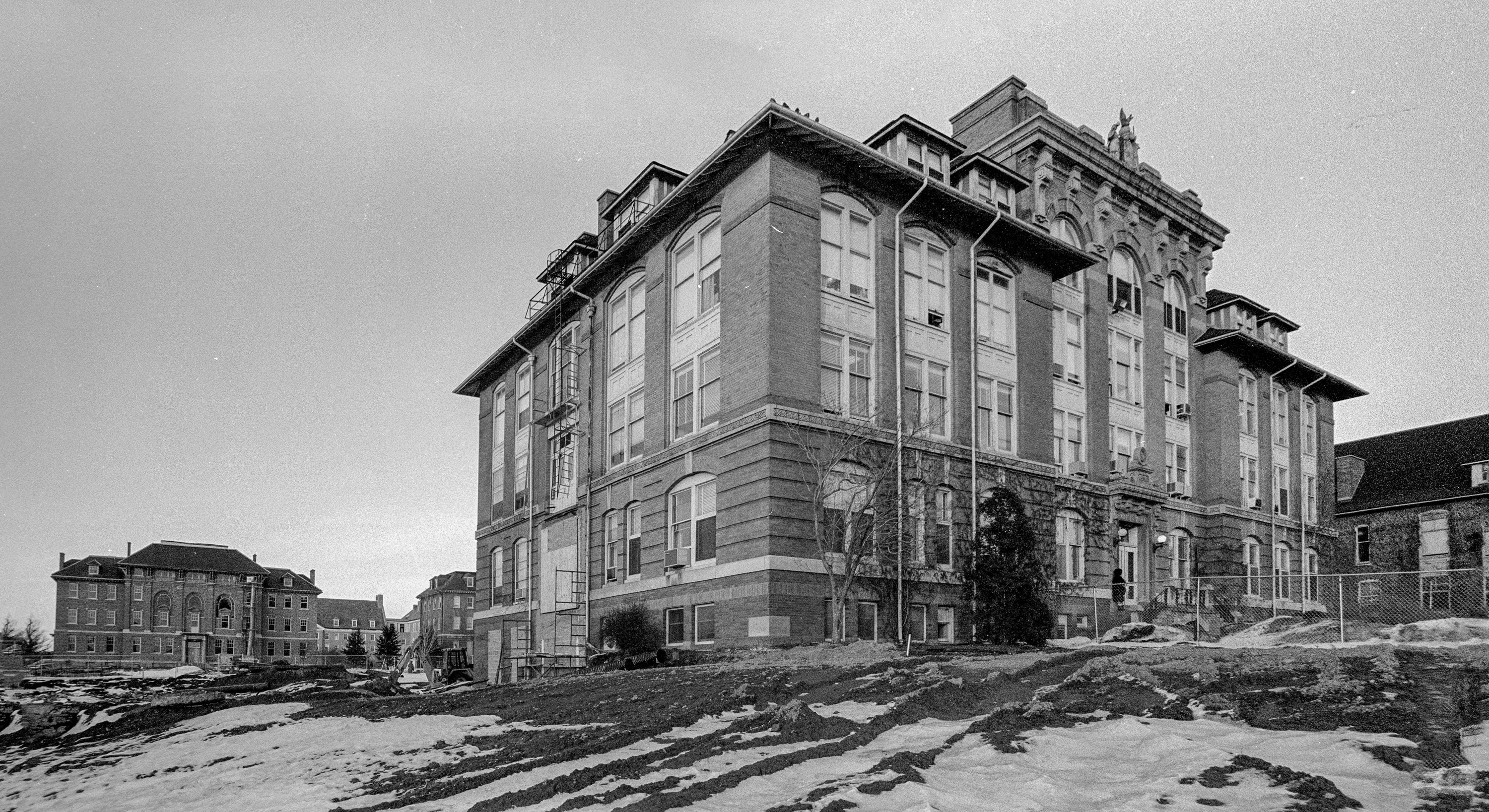
Roberts Hall in 1987. The empty space to the left is where Stone Hall previously stood.

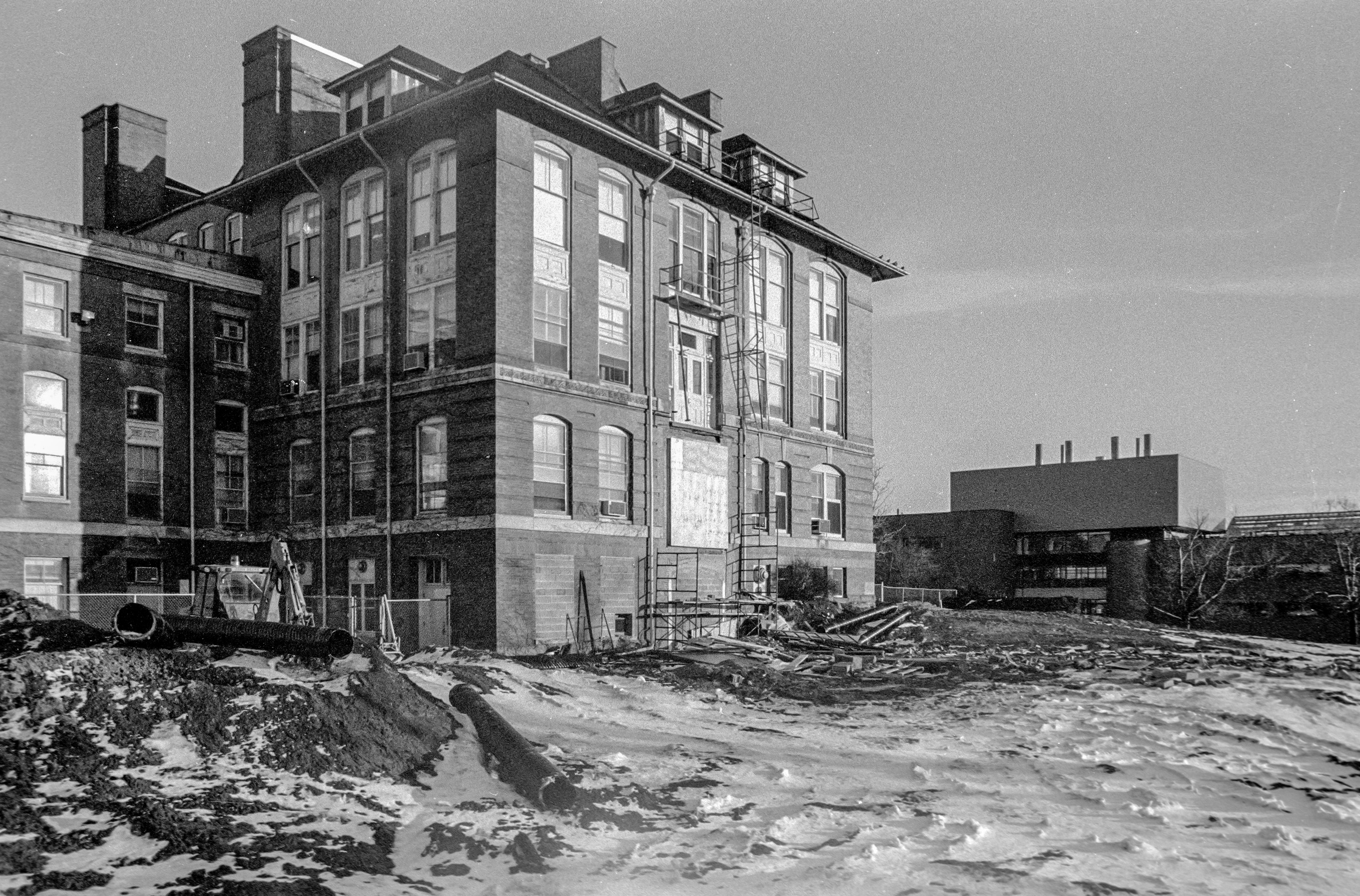
The west side of Roberts Hall stands exposed after Stone's demolition. ca 1988.

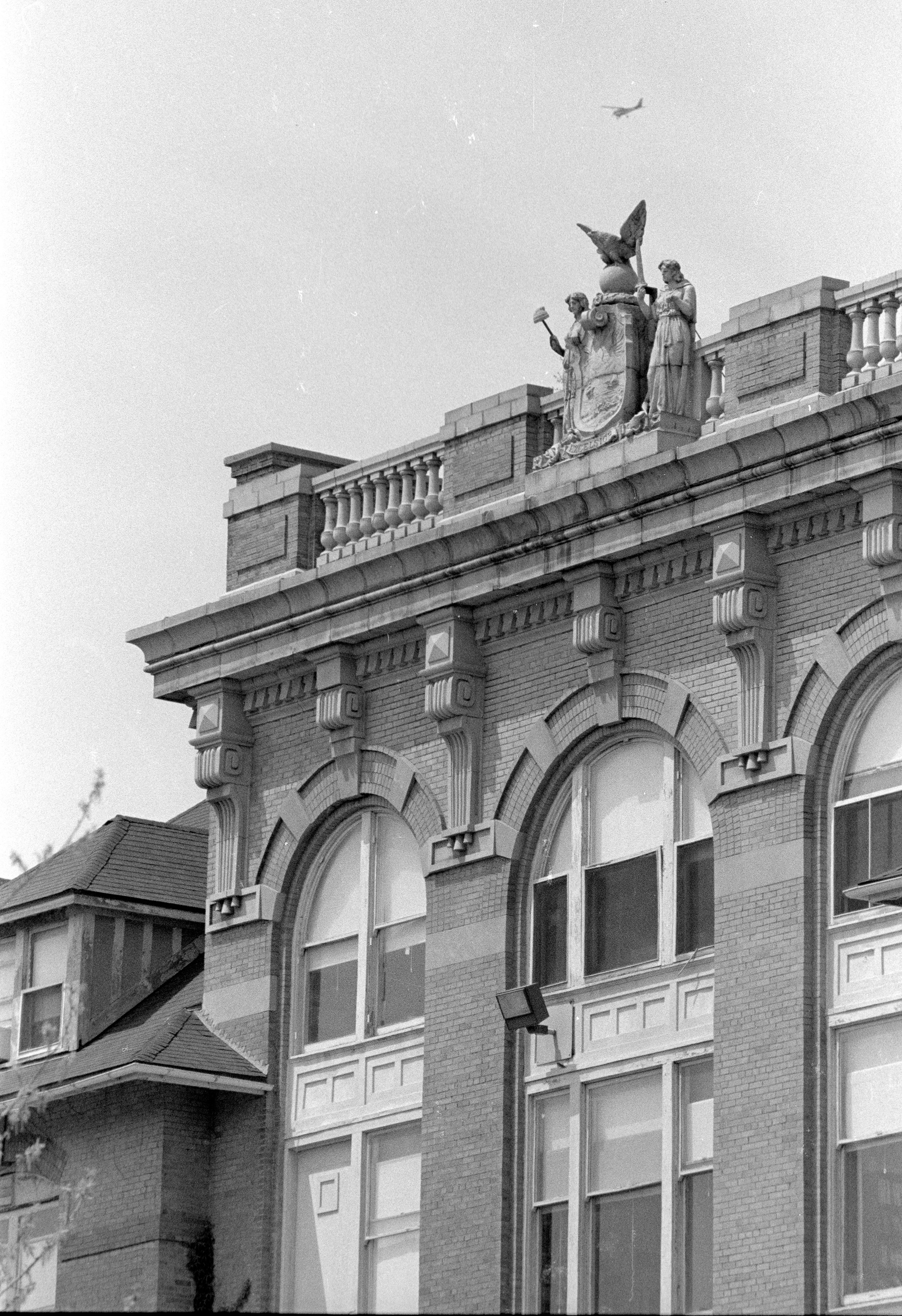
Detail of stonework

== Kennedy-Roberts Complex ==
=== History ===
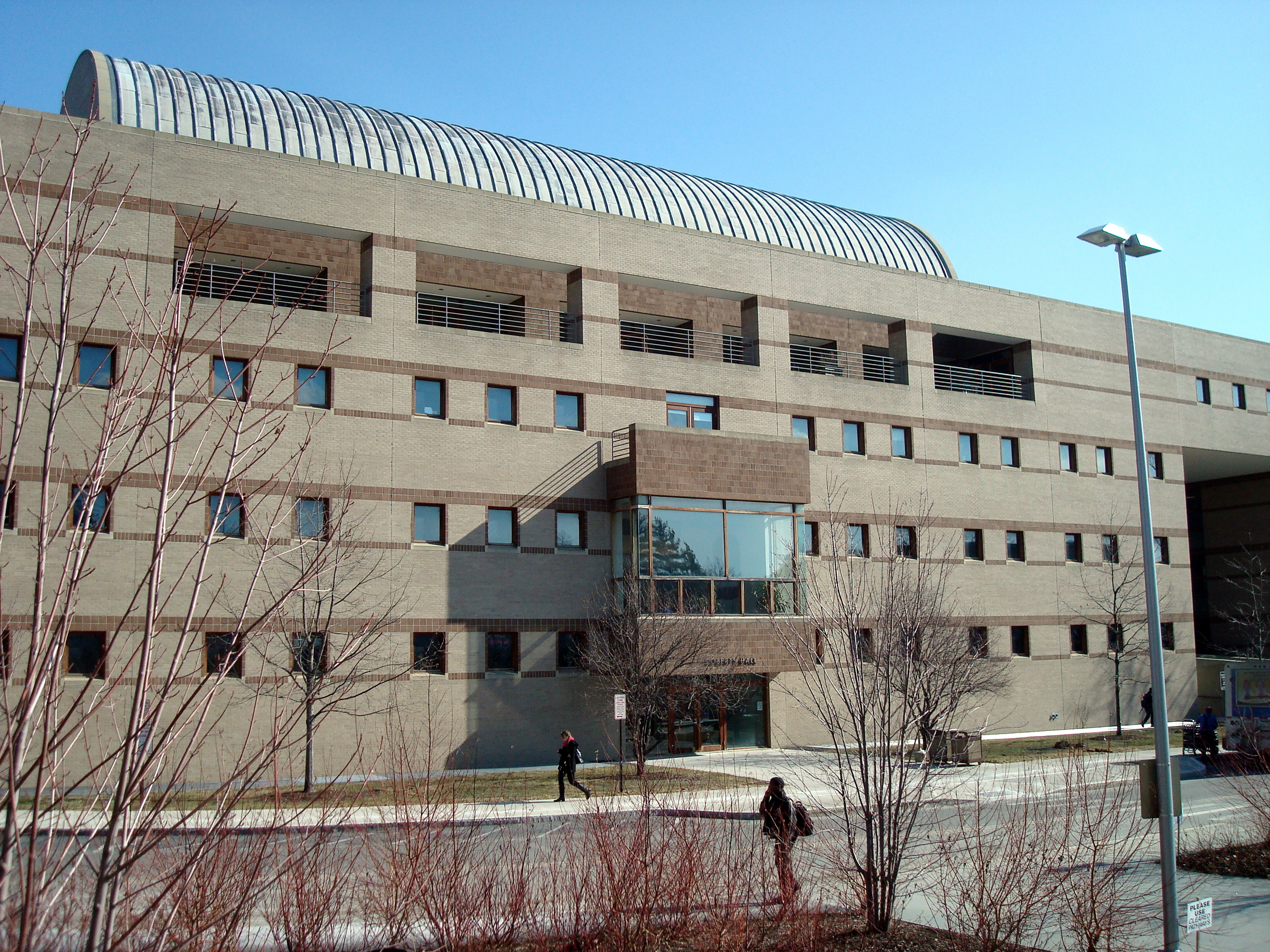
The modern complex

Construction of what was originally known as Academic I began in May 1987 on the end of the Ag quad, on the site where Stone Hall formerly stood. The architect was Gwathmey Siegel & Associates Architects, which also designed its companion Academic II as well as Frank Rhodes Hall at around the same time. By February 1990, Academic I was completed and hosting academic and cultural events in its 600-seat auditorium. The building contained classrooms, offices, the Departments of Communication Arts and Education, and the Landscape Architecture Program. It was soon named for W. Keith Kennedy, agriculture dean from 1972-1978, and provost from 1978-1984.

Academic II contained the Department of Entomology, biology laboratories, and Media Services, and was named for professor and Agriculture school dean Isaac Roberts.

The formal dedication of the connected structures as Kennedy Hall and Roberts Hall took place September 6, 1990.

=== Description ===
Kennedy Hall and the ″new″ Roberts Hall are one large complex, joined together with access between each through the ground floor and the fourth floor. On the first floor of Kennedy Hall is the David L. Call Alumni Auditorium, also known as 116 Kennedy Hall. The Call Auditorium juts out from Kennedy Hall to the east. Outside, to the north of the auditorium, is a small plaza, complete with seating and an area of shrubs and trees in a large planting bed directly abutting the building. The planting was designed and executed in the spring of 2011 by students in a cross-listed landscape architecture (LA) and horticulture (HORT) class as part of their curriculum. The class, LA/HORT 4910/20 — Creating the Urban Eden: Woody Plant Selection, Design, and Landscape Establishment, was co-taught by Peter J. Trowbridge and Nina Bassuk.

== See also ==
- East Roberts Hall
- Stone Hall
