= Roberts Hall =

Roberts Hall can refer to:

== Australia ==
- Roberts Hall, of Monash University

== United States ==
- Roberts Hall (Ithaca, New York), at Cornell University
