= Cornell University Graduate School =

Graduate school in Ithaca, New York, US

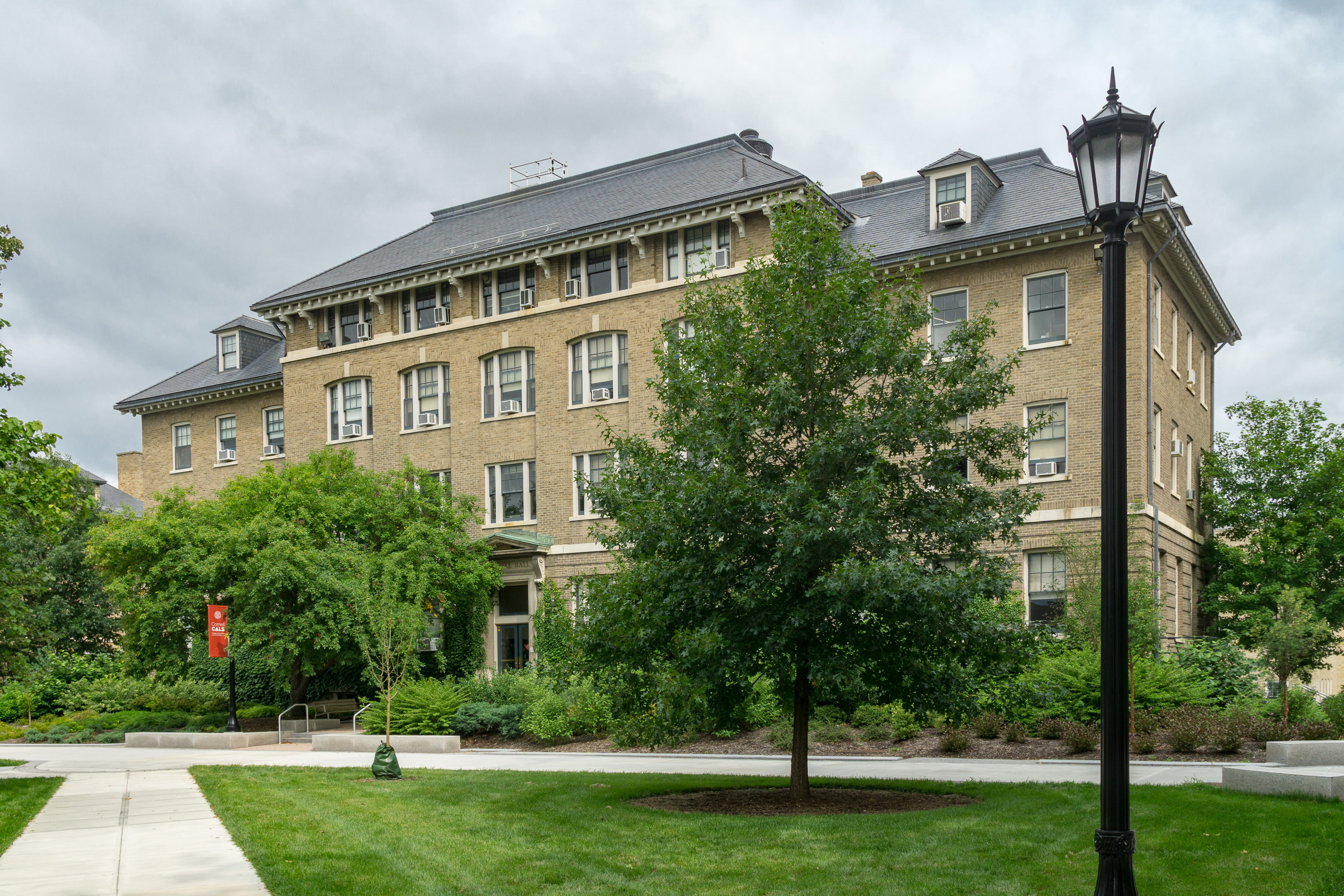
- Caldwell Hall, where the administrative offices for the Graduate School are located in.
- Type: Private
- Established: 1909
- Dean: Kathryn Boor
- Postgraduates: 4,971
- Location: Ithaca, New York, U.S.
- Website: www.gradschool.cornell.edu

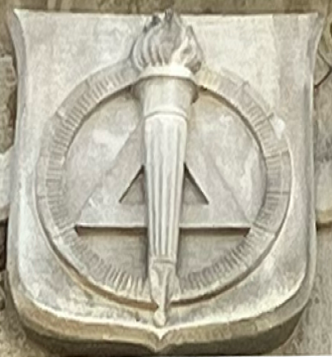
On the left, the shied of the Graduate School as seen at the entrance of Willard Straight Hall. On the right, the banner of the Graduate School used at commencement ceremonies.

The Cornell University Graduate School is a graduate school at Cornell University in Ithaca, New York. It confers most of the university's professional and research master's and doctoral degrees. The departments under which instruction and research take place are housed in Cornell's other schools and colleges. The administrative offices for the Graduate School are located in Caldwell Hall, on the Ag Quad.

== Location ==
For decades, the Graduate School was housed in Sage Hall, which also included social areas and dormitory rooms for graduate students. The Graduate School does not have a faculty. Instead, it organizes the faculty of other colleges into "fields" representing distinct subject areas. Students apply for admission to a specific field, although once admitted, students are not limited to that field when selecting courses or faculty to serve of the committee supervising the student's research.

The Samuel Curtis Johnson Graduate School of Management, Cornell Law School, and Cornell Veterinary School also confer graduate degrees, but not PhD degrees. The Weill Cornell Medical School and the Tri-Institutional MD–PhD Program have authority to confer PhD degrees independent of the Graduate School.

== History ==
At one time, Cornell established a Graduate School of Aerospace Engineering and a Graduate School of Nutrition that were independent of the centralized Graduate School. However, both institutions have been absorbed into other academic units.

As of 2019-2020, the tuition for the Graduate School is $29,500 for fields in the endowed colleges and $20,800 for fields in the statutory colleges. In 2010, the Graduate School had 3,367 students with faculty advisors employed in Cornell's endowed units and 1,604 students with faculty advisors employed in statutory colleges.
