= Kathryn Boor =

American food scientist and academic administrator

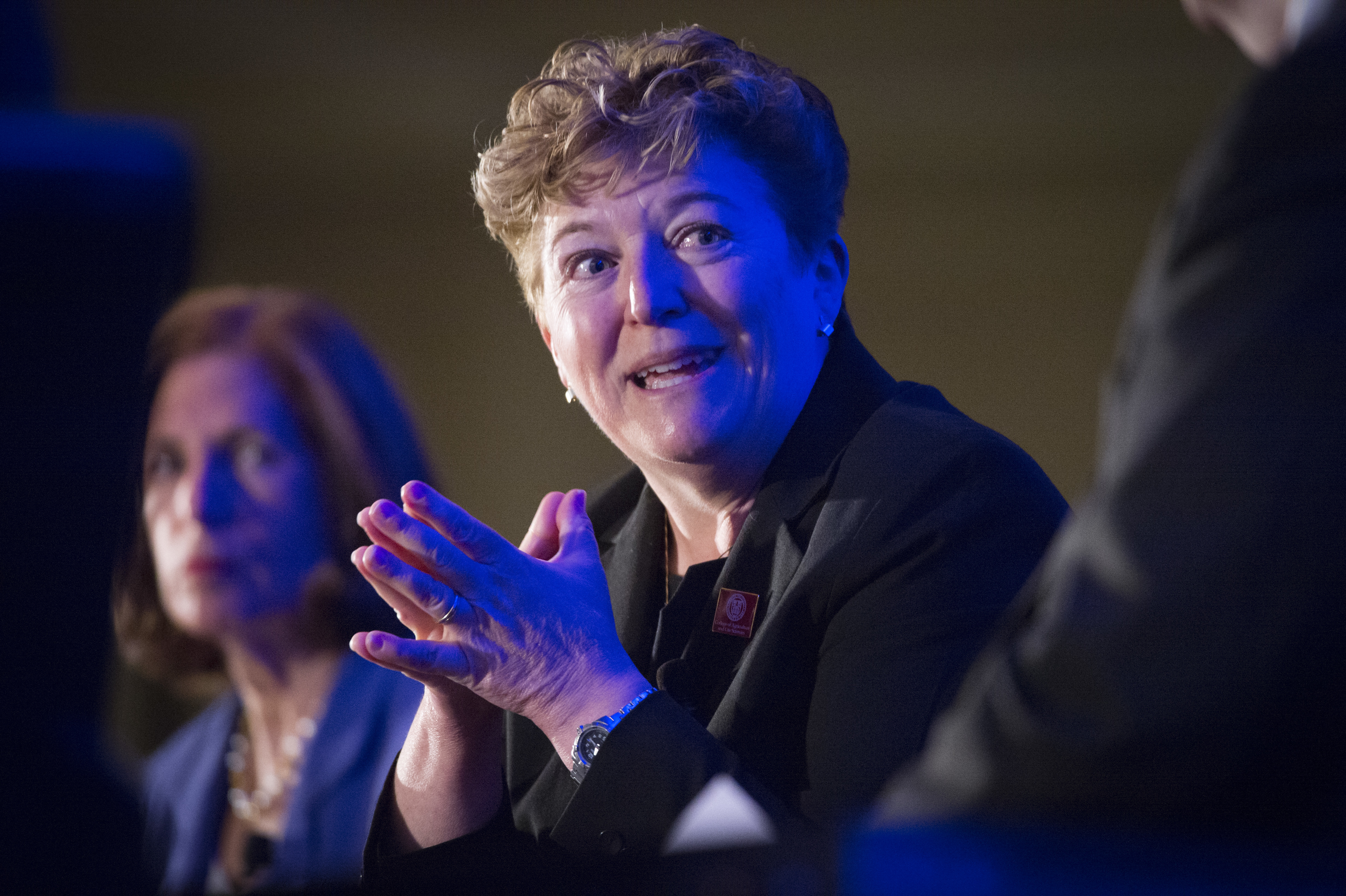
- Boor speaking at the 2016 USDA Ag Outlook Forum
- Born: New York

Academic background
- Education: Cornell University (BS); University of Wisconsin-Madison (MS); University of California, Davis (PhD)

Academic work
- Discipline: Food Science

Kathryn J. Boor is an American food scientist and academic administrator. She is a professor of food processing microbiology at Cornell University. From 2020-25, she served as the dean of Cornell University's Graduate School and vice provost for graduate education. and from 2010-20, as the Ronald P Lynch Dean of the Cornell University College of Agriculture and Life Sciences (CALS).

== Early life ==
Boor was born and raised on a family-owned dairy farm in Chemung County in upstate New York. She obtained a BS in Food Science from Cornell University CALS in 1980, and an MS in Food Science from the University of Wisconsin-Madison in 1983. Her MS research with Winrock International in Kenya focused on improving human nutrition among limited-resource farmers. She returned to the US and earned a PhD in Microbiology at the University of California, Davis in 1994.

== Career ==
Boor returned to Cornell University in 1994 and became the first tenured female Associate Professor in the Department of Food Science. She established the Food Safety Laboratory and was co-lead for the Milk Quality Improvement Program. Her research focuses on identifying biological factors that affect the transmission of bacteria in food systems. A newly discovered bacterium was named Listeria booriae to honor her work on Listeria monocytogenes, a food-borne pathogen. She was appointed as the Ronald P. Lynch Dean in 2010. As of August 2025, her h-index was 87 and her work had been cited over 20,400 times.

== Awards and honors ==
- 2000 USDA Honor Award as a member of the Listeria Outbreak Working Group
- 2000 Foundation Scholar Award from the American Dairy Science Association
- 2006 DeLaval Dairy Extension Award from the American Dairy Science Association
- 2002 Samuel Cate Prescott Award for outstanding research from the Institute of Food Technologists
- Fellow of the American Academy of Microbiology
- Fellow of the International Academy of Food Science and Technology
- Fellow of the Institute of Food Technologists
- Fellow of the American Association for the Advancement of Science
- Fellow of the American Dairy Science Association
- Honorary Doctorate from Harper Adams University in the United Kingdom in 2016
- 2018 Woman of Distinction by New York Senate
- 2020 Harris Award for Excellence in Food Science and Technology, The Ohio State University
- 2020 Gerhard J. Haas Award for creative work in microbial food safety, Institute of Food Technologists
- 2020 Distinguished Service Citation, New York State Agricultural Society
