= Nina Bassuk =

American academic

Nina Lauren Bassuk (born February 16, 1952) is an Emeritus Professor and program leader of the Urban Horticulture Institute at Cornell University.

== Education ==
Bassuk received her B.S. in Horticulture from Cornell University in 1974 and her Ph.D. in Horticulture from the University of London in 1980.

== Research and career ==
Bassuk has worked in the Horticulture Department of Cornell University since 1980. In 1993, she became the program leader at the Urban Horticulture Institute. Her teaching, research and extension efforts aspire to enhance the function and health of plants growing in urban and disturbed areas. She helped to develop the Student Weekend Arborist Team (SWAT) to inventory public trees in small communities. Her findings have led to the development of the Woody Plants Database whose focus is on woody plants used for landscaping in the Northeast.

Through her work researching the physiological problems of plants growing in urban environments, she has developed several technologies to improve establishment and health of plants, including development of ‘CU-Structural Soil,’ for which she holds a patent with her colleague Jason Grabosky. As the program leader at the Urban Horticulture Institute, she has developed hybrid oak trees to be especially tolerant of urban conditions. She has authored over 100 papers focusing on the physiological problems of plants growing in urban environments. In 2017, she was asked by the National Park Service to evaluate the elm trees planted on the National Mall to ensure their protection and preservation.

Nina serves on the technical advisory committee of the Sustainable Sites Initiative and is on the board of New York State Urban Forestry Council. She retired from Cornell in 2022.

== Selected publications ==
=== Books ===
- Coauthor, Trees in the Urban Landscape with Peter Trowbridge

=== Research articles ===
- Yin, J., Bassuk, N. L., Oldburg, M. W., & Bauerle, T. L. (2014). Fine Root Hydraulic Conductance is Related to Post-transplant Recovery of Two Quercus Tree Species. Journal of the American Society for Horticultural Science. 139:649-656.
- Cowett, F., & Bassuk, N. L. (2014). Statewide assessment of street trees in New York State, USA. Urban Forestry & Urban Greening. 13:213-220.
- Cowett, F., & Bassuk, N. L. (2012). SWAT (Student Weekend Arborist Team): A Model for Land Grant Institutions and Cooperative Extension Systems to Conduct Street Tree Inventories. Journal of Extension. 50:Article EFEA9.
- Loh, Felix CW, Jason C. Grabosky, and Nina L. Bassuk. "Using the SPAD 502 meter to assess chlorophyll and nitrogen content of benjamin fig and cottonwood leaves." HortTechnology 12.4 (2002): 682-686.
- Buckstrup, Michelle J., and Nina L. Bassuk. "Transplanting success of balled-and-burlapped versus bare-root trees in the urban landscape." Journal of Arboriculture 26.6 (2000): 298-308.

== Awards ==
- 2015 Olmsted Award, National Arbor Day Foundation
