= Stone Hall (Ithaca, New York) =

Building at Cornell University (1905–1980s)

- U.S. National Register of Historic Places
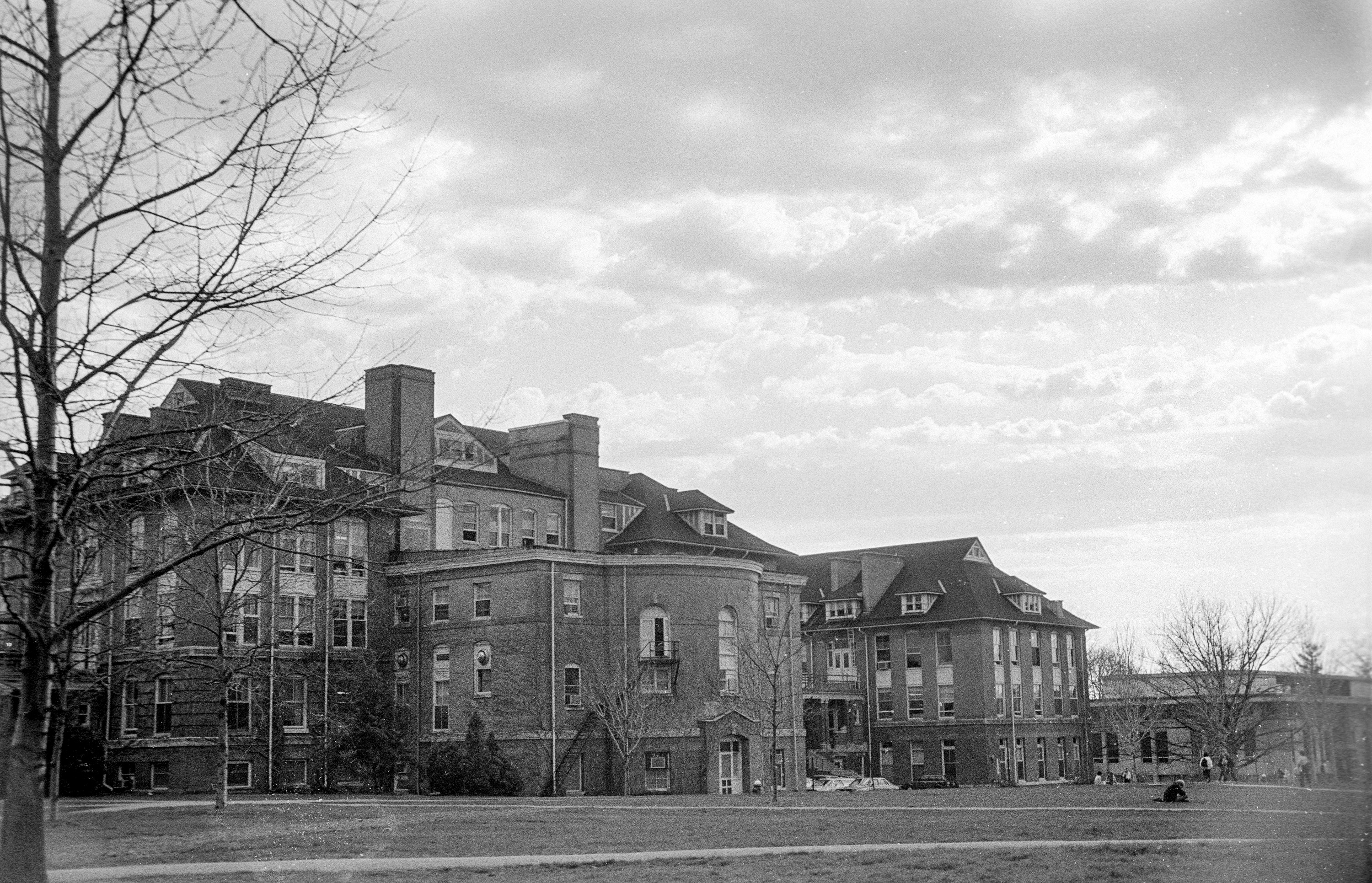
- The rear of Stone Hall can be seen to the center right in this ca. 1984 photo. Roberts Hall is the larger connected building to the left.

- Location within New York Location within the United States
- Location: Cornell University campus, Ithaca, New York
- Coordinates: 42°26′55″N 76°28′46″W
- Built: 1905
- Architect: Heins, George L.; Kantrowitz, Morris
- Architectural style: Classical Revival, Beaux Arts, Renaissance
- MPS: New York State College of Agriculture TR
- NRHP reference No.: 84003860
- Added to NRHP: September 24, 1984

Stone Hall was a building on the campus of Cornell University in Ithaca, New York, named after John Lemuel Stone, a CALS professor of farm practice during the early 1900s. Stone, Roberts, and East Roberts Hall were three joined buildings on the Agriculture Quadrangle, with the larger Roberts in the center and Stone and East Roberts on the west and east sides, respectively. The three buildings made up the original New York State College of Agriculture, built 1905–1906. The three were demolished in the late 1980s, despite the efforts of the City of Ithaca and local preservationists to save the buildings.

== Controversy over demolition ==
The State University of New York determined that the three buildings were in poor and deteriorating condition. A 1973 study conducted by State University of New York suggested that renovation would cost over $14 million. Instead, they planned to first raze Stone Hall to make room for a new administrative building to be called Academic I. After Academic I's completion, the state planned to raze Roberts and East Roberts to build a new plant sciences building.

=== Legal battles ===
Local preservationist group Historic Ithaca, in an attempt to save the building, had the structures listed on the National Register of Historic Places in 1984, as well as designated a city historic landmark. Starting in 1982, the city and Historic Ithaca launched a series of lawsuits and appeals in an attempt to block demolition. The city argued in court that the buildings could not be altered without approval from the Ithaca Landmarks Preservation Commission.

=== Demolition ===
On February 10, 1986, about "one tenth" of Stone Hall was demolished, ahead of the late February date which was expected. A state Supreme Court issued a temporary restraining order, pointing out that a demolition permit had not been granted by the city. In July 1986, a State Supreme court judge ruled that state college campus buildings are not protected by local preservation orders. After standing partially-demolished for much of the year, the remainder of the building was removed in December 1986. Construction of "Academic I" (now known as Kennedy Hall) began in May 1987.

Citing the legal precedent of Stone Hall, the State University officials proceeded with the demolition of Roberts Hall and East Roberts Hall in July 1990.

== See also ==
- Roberts Hall
- East Roberts Hall
