= Benjamin Z. Houlton =

American environmental scientist

Benjamin Z. Houlton is an environmental scientist and the Ronald P. Lynch Dean of the Cornell University College of Agriculture and Life Sciences. Previously he served as the director of the John Muir Institute of the Environment at University of California, Davis. In 2025, Houlton was considered for the presidency of Iowa State University.

His research interests include global ecosystem processes, climate change solutions, and agricultural sustainability. He was appointed dean in October 2020. His lab created a new benchmarking tool to calculate nitrogen's substantial impact on the global climate system used by the Intergovernmental Panel on Climate Change. A 2018 paper found that 25% of the nitrogen available to plants comes from rock weathering.
