= Charles E. Palm =

American entomologist (1911–1996)

- Born: 1911; Austin, Texas, USA
- Died: February 25, 1996 (aged 84–85); Ithaca, New York, USA
- Education: University of Arkansas; Cornell University
- Spouse: Geraldine Gibson
- Children: 1
- Scientific career
- Fields: Entomology; Entomotoxicology; Insect physiology; Biochemistry
- Workplaces: New York State College of Agriculture at Cornell University

Charles Edmund Palm (1911-Feb. 25, 1996) was an American entomologist and Dean of the New York State College of Agriculture at Cornell University for 13 years from 1959 to 1972.

Palm was born in Austin, Texas, and grew up on a fruit and vegetable farm in northwest Arkansas. He graduated with honors from the University of Arkansas and then earned a Ph.D. from Cornell University in 1935.

Palm was an expert in international agricultural development and was a consultant to the Ford Foundation on Mexico's agricultural program. After research showed the harmful ecological effects of chemical pesticides, Palm advocated the continued use of DDT in controlled circumstances.

While at Cornell, Palm served for 19 years as Chairman of the Department of Entomology and Limnology. He also served as the Agriculture College's Director of Research for two years (1957–59) before becoming Dean. While Dean, Palm created Cornell's office of International Agriculture Development. Palm retired in 1976.

Palm was a member of the National Academy of Sciences-National Research Council (NAS-NRC) for nine years. He chaired NAS-NRC's Committee on Plant and Animal Pests. He was also chairman of NAS-NRC's Agricultural Board and its executive committee from 1965 to 1968. Charles Palm died on February 25, 1996, at the Cayuga Medical Center in Ithaca, New York.
