= East Roberts Hall =

Building at Cornell University (1906–1980s)

- U.S. National Register of Historic Places
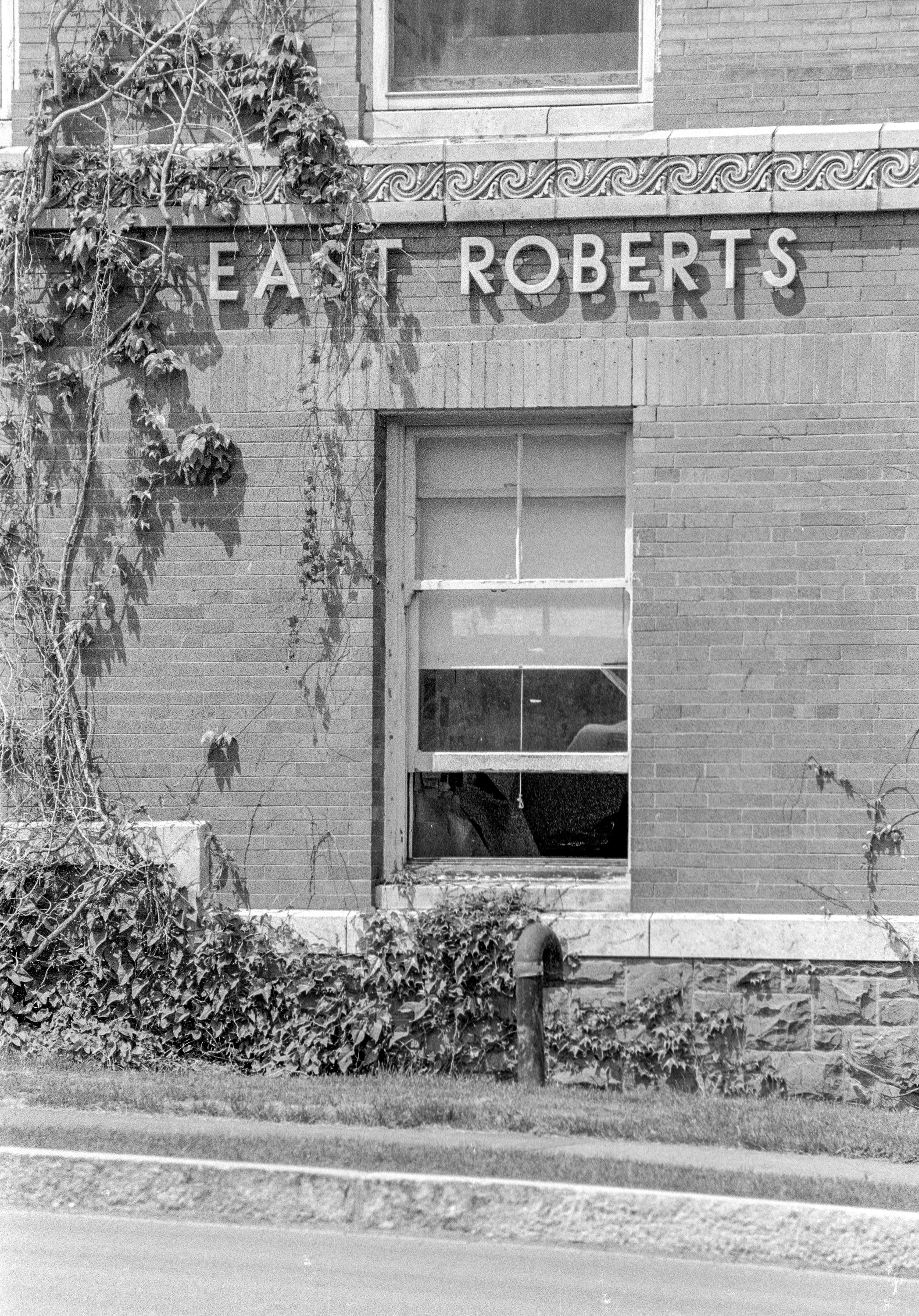
- The sign on East Roberts Hall

- Location within New York Location within the United States
- Location: Cornell University campus, Ithaca, New York
- Coordinates: 42°26′55″N 76°28′42″W
- Built: 1905
- Architect: Heins, George L.; Kantrowitz, Morris
- Architectural style: Classical Revival, Renaissance
- Demolished: 1987-1988
- MPS: New York State College of Agriculture TR
- NRHP reference No.: 84003178
- Added to NRHP: September 24, 1984

East Roberts Hall was a building on the campus of Cornell University in Ithaca, New York, which opened on Wednesday, October 10, 1906. Originally just referred to as the Dairy Building, it was not called East Roberts Hall until 1923 when other departments moved in and the Dairy Department moved out and into the new Dairy Building. East Roberts Hall was demolished along with Roberts and Stone Halls ca 1987-1988.

It was listed on the U.S. National Register of Historic Places in 1984.

== See also ==
- Roberts Hall
- Stone Hall
