= George Chapman Caldwell =

American chemist, horticulturalist and instructor

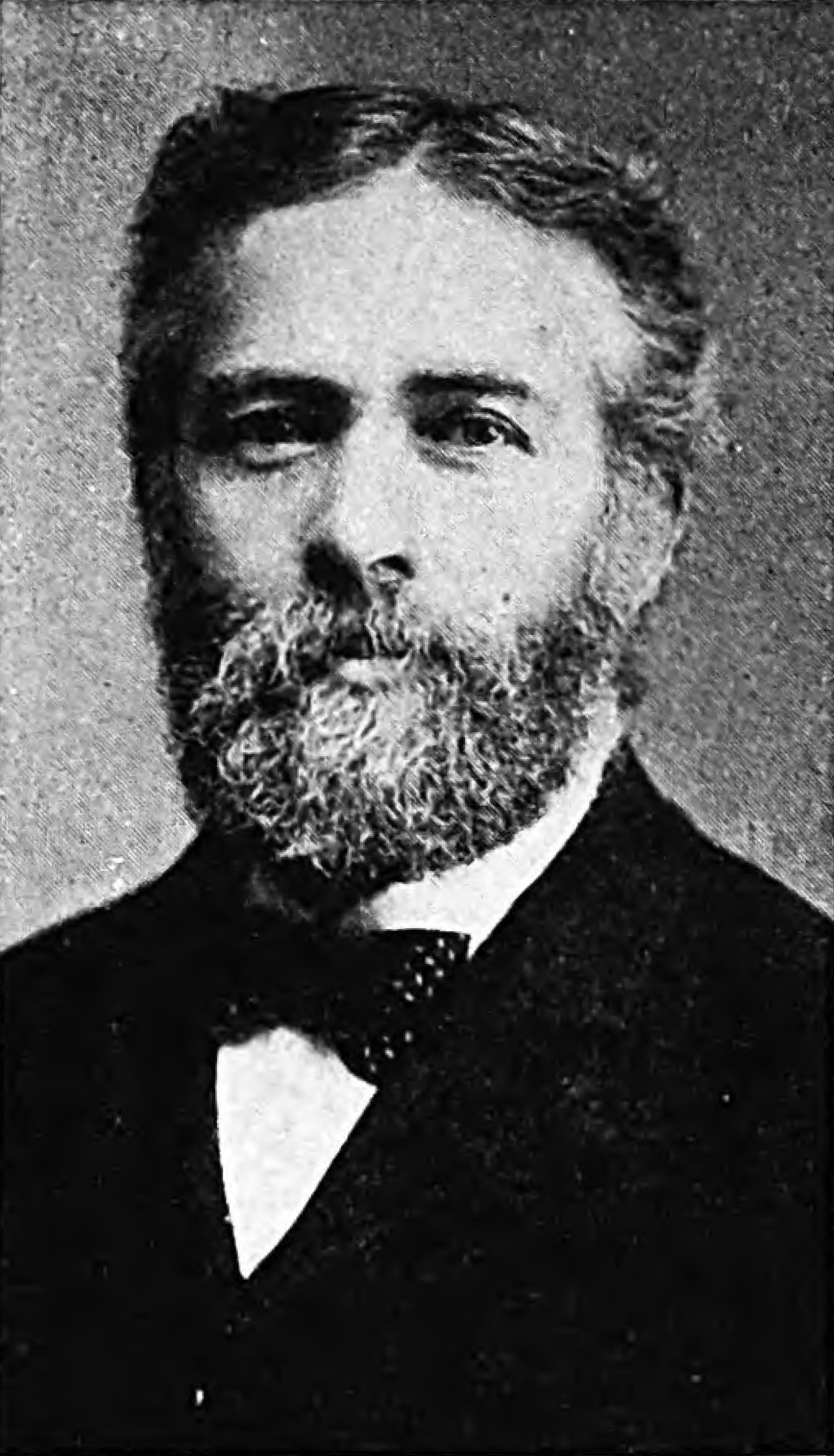
- Born: August 14, 1834; Framingham, Massachusetts
- Died: September 7, 1907 (aged 73); Ithaca, New York
- Education: Ph.D.
- Alma mater: Harvard University, University of Göttingen
- Occupations: Agricultural chemist, horticulturalist, instructor
- Spouse: Rebecca Stanley Wilmarth
- Children: Grace Wilmarth Caldwell
- Parent(s): Jacob Caldwell, Mary Ann Patch

George Chapman Caldwell (August 14, 1834 – September 7, 1907) was an American chemist, horticulturalist, and instructor.

== Early years ==
Born August 14, 1834, in Framingham, Massachusetts, the son of the Rev. Jacob Caldwell (Unitarian) and Mary Ann Patch, in 1851 he matriculated to Harvard University where he studied at the Lawrence Scientific School. After graduating in 1855, he spent two years studying at the laboratory of Friedrich Wöhler in the University of Göttingen, followed by a year at Robert Bunsen's laboratory at Heidelberg. He was awarded a Ph.D. from Göttingen University in 1856.

== Career ==
Returning to the United States, in 1859 he was appointed assistant professor of chemistry at Columbia College, where he remained until 1860 when he was appointed professor of chemistry, botany, and physics at Antioch College. In 1861 he was married to Rebecca Stanley Wilmarth. Following the start of the American Civil War, he became chief clerk and hospital visitor for the United States Sanitary Commission during 1862–64, whereupon he was named professor of chemistry for the Pennsylvania State College. In 1867 he became vice president of the college.

With the founding of Cornell University in 1868, he was recruited to serve as professor of agriculture and analytic chemistry—becoming the first professor appointed at the university. While Dr. Caldwell was chair of the chemistry department at Cornell, it expanded from a single classroom and laboratory into a department that occupied two buildings, making it one of the world-leaders in chemistry education and research. A number of graduates of the department, among whom were students of Dr. Caldwell, became notable soil scientists. In 1869, he published Agricultural Chemical Analysis, the first textbook on agricultural science. He became head of the newly founded Cornell University Agricultural Experiment Station in 1879. In 1903, Caldwell was named professor emeritus, then he retired on June 7, 1906. He died September 7, 1907, at Ithaca, New York.

== Legacy ==
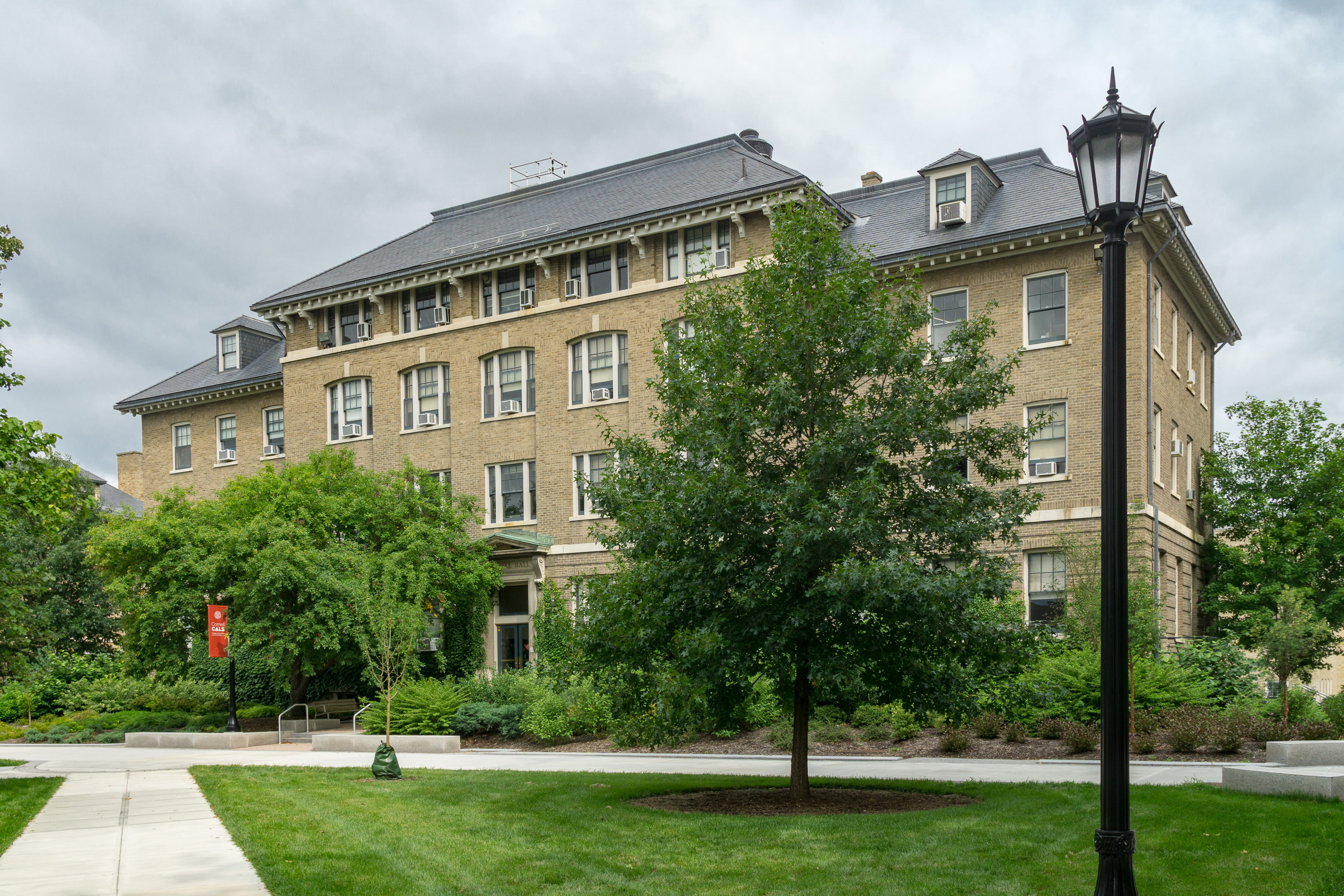
Caldwell Hall at Cornell University

Dr. Caldwell helped to found the Society for the Promotion of Agricultural Science and served as president of the Official Agricultural Chemists. He was a fellow of the American Association for the Advancement of Science and was elected vice president in 1881. In 1892, he was elected President of the American Chemical Society. Caldwell Hall on the Cornell University campus was named after him in 1913. His daughter Grace Wilmarth Caldwell graduated with an A.B. from Cornell in 1892.

== Bibliography ==
- Agricultural Chemical Analysis, 1869
- Manual of Introductory Chemical Practice, 1875, with Abram A. Breneman
- The American Chemist, 1894
- Elements of Qualitative and Quantitative Chemical Analysis, 1894
