= Peter Trowbridge =

American landscape architect

Peter Trowbridge is an American landscape architect, Emeritus Professor, and former Chair of Landscape Architecture at Cornell University

== Education ==
He received an AS from Alfred State University, a BS/BLA degree from Syracuse University, Environmental Science and Forestry, and a Master's in Landscape Architecture from Harvard University Graduate School of Design.

== Career ==
He worked for major landscape architecture firms as a project manager, including Schumm and Werle, and Reimann/Buechner; he then became Principal of the firm, Trowbridge & Wolf Landscape Architects in 1976. Peter Trowbridge is a founding principal of Chiuten Trowbridge Landscape Architects DPC.

== Achievements ==
He has been Editor of Landscape and Urban Planning Journal, and was a Contributing Editor of Landscape Architecture Magazine. He is the Chair of the Landscape Architecture Accreditation Board, Past President, New York Upstate Chapter of the American Society of Landscape Architects, and Fellow of the American Society of Landscape Architects

25 Most Admired Faculty (2016) Design Intelligence

25 Most Admired Educators (2013) Design Intelligence

Outstanding Administrator (2013) Council of Educators in Landscape Architecture

== Publications ==
=== Books ===
- Coauthor, Trees in the Urban Landscape with Nina Bassuk
