= Structural Soil =

Structural Soil is a medium that can be compacted to pavement design and installation requirements while permitting root growth. It is a mixture of gap-graded gravels (mostly made of crushed stone) and soil (mineral content and organic content). It provides an integrated, root penetrable, high strength pavement system that shifts design away from individual tree pits.

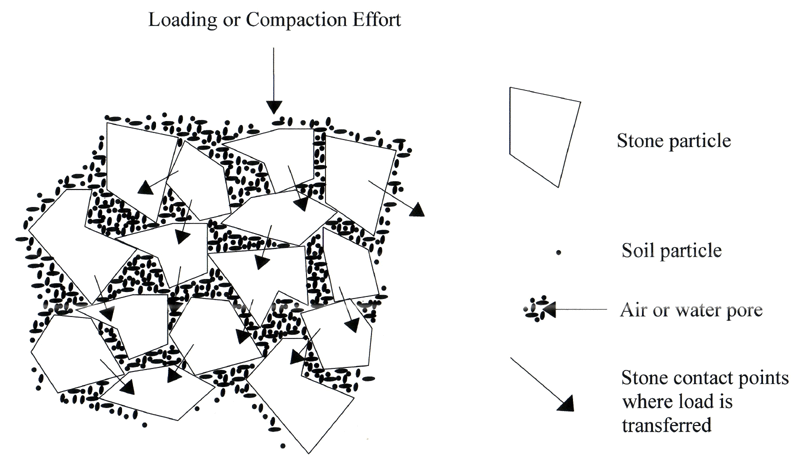
Structural Soil diagram

== History of structural soil ==
Amsterdam treesoil is the first structural soil applied to increase the life expectancy of urbantrees. The reason for this development began in 1966 in Amsterdam in the Netherlands because of the high mortality rate among trees. And at the beginning of the 70s Amsterdam treesoil was the solution for the trees surrounded by pavers.

In the late 70's it was the city of Groningen, also in the Netherlands, which had a solution for heavy traffic. For the first time a structural soil based on crushed stones was applied. It was called skeleton soil (in Dutch it is called "skeletbodem").

Soon after the first positive results became known, this solution received a lot of follow-up in various countries. Now after many decades of experience, we see various trends in the development of structural soil. One of these is to distinguish between two separate main groups.

- SBSS Sand Based Structural Soil
- GBSS Gravel Based Structural Soil

== Problems with typical installations ==
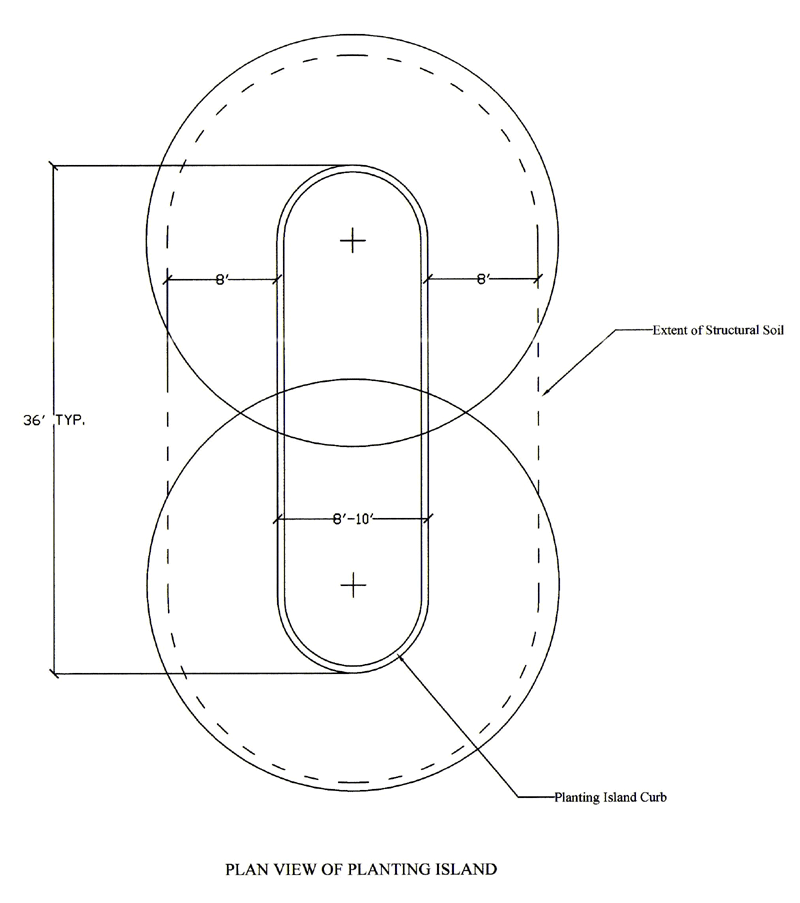
Plan view of Structural Soil extents

Previously the main problem facing the establishment of trees in paved areas is the lack of enough volume of soil for tree root growth. Soils under pavements are typically so compacted that it stops roots from growing. Older established trees with their roots under pavement grow poorly and often die. They can also cause pavement failure and displacement. Overall pavement preparation and repairs can shorten the life expectancy of a tree to 7–10 years where we could see them grow for at least 50 more years.

== CU-Structural Soil ==
Structural soil was researched and developed in the 1990s by Cornell University’s Urban Horticulture Institute. In 1999, AMEREQ signed a licensing agreement with Cornell University and currently holds the patent rights to Cornell’s CU-Structural Soil Urban Tree Planting Mix. It is marketed as CU-Structural Soil for quality control and is produced by a network of qualified AMEREQ-licensed companies. CU-Structural Soil on average costs $35–$42 per ton. Other companies have formed their own brand of structural soil based on Cornell’s work. For example, STALITE has developed STALITE MATRIX Structural Soil that they claim holds more moisture.

== Wallace Structural Soil/Gap Graded Soil ==
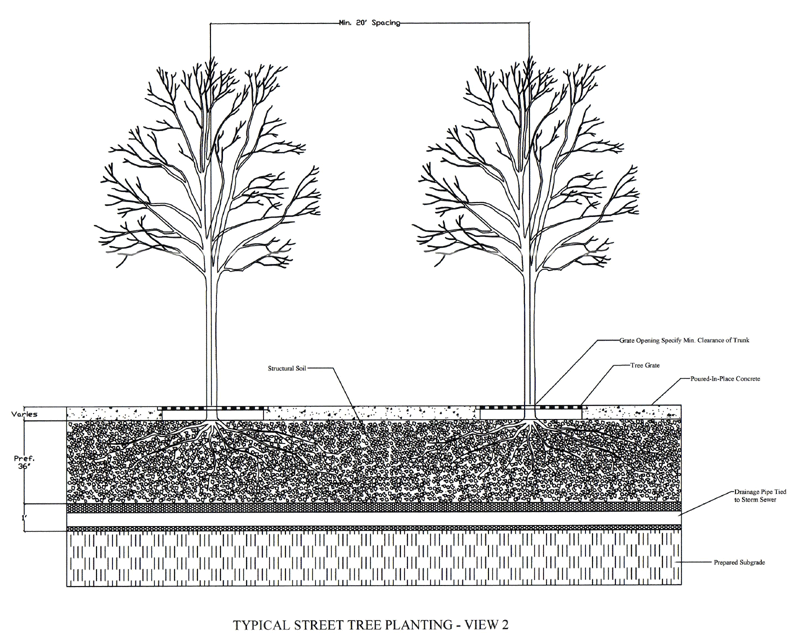
Typical street planting section with Structural Soil

Wallace Laboratories modified work in 1994 which had been done by others to help improve the technology. The concept had been used in Europe in the 1980s. They did not seek a patent on their work but left the technology in the public domain for others to freely use. Their work preceded the filing of the Cornell University patent.

Briefly, the aggregate size was increased to about 2 inches (5.1 cm), the soil texture was changed to a clay or clay loam in order to increase the water holding capacity and nutrient capacity, the soil was conditioned with the linear polyacrylamide, and the soil chemical and physical properties were specified.

Their procedure has been extensively used worldwide. One municipal installation used about 50,000 cubic yards of the Wallace Labs formulation.

== Composition ==
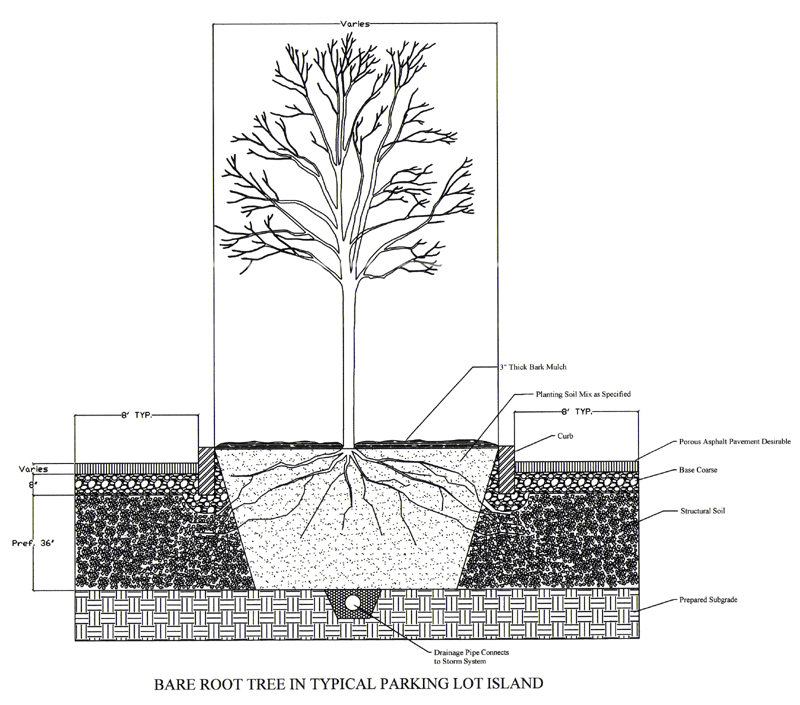
Plan view of Structural Soil extents

Structural soil is composed of crushed stone (typically limestone or granite) narrowly graded from ¾-1 ½” highly angular with no fines, clay loam which should conform to the USDA soil classification system. The hydrogel is added in a small amount to prevent the separation of the stone and soil during mixing and installation. Usually a layer of stone is spread, then the dry hydrogel is spread evenly on top and screened moist loam is placed on top. The entire mixture is then turned until a uniform blend is produced. Structural soil is not typically stockpiled; it should be mixed and installed soon after delivery. If a stockpile is required, the soil needs to be protected from the elements so it does not become contaminated. Installation typically calls for two cubic feet of soil is needed for every square foot of crown projected. It is also recommended for irrigated trees to have a low-volume drip irrigation. Cornell also suggests a minimum of 24” to 36” for CU-Structural Soil depth and they have established no minimum for length and width of installation, however, because it is a structural soil it was designed to go under the entire pavement area. Testing has shown that structural soil is safe around utilities and that you can use trees from any production system such as balled-and-bur lapped, bare root, containerized and boxed trees.

== Continued development ==
Cornell is continuing its development of CU-Structural Soil, expanding its use as the need for trees and other greenery within highly urbanized areas grows. CU-Structural Soil has been used in over 1000 applications and has been proven a very viable option for construction in cities.
