= Caldwell Hall (Ithaca, New York) =

- U.S. National Register of Historic Places
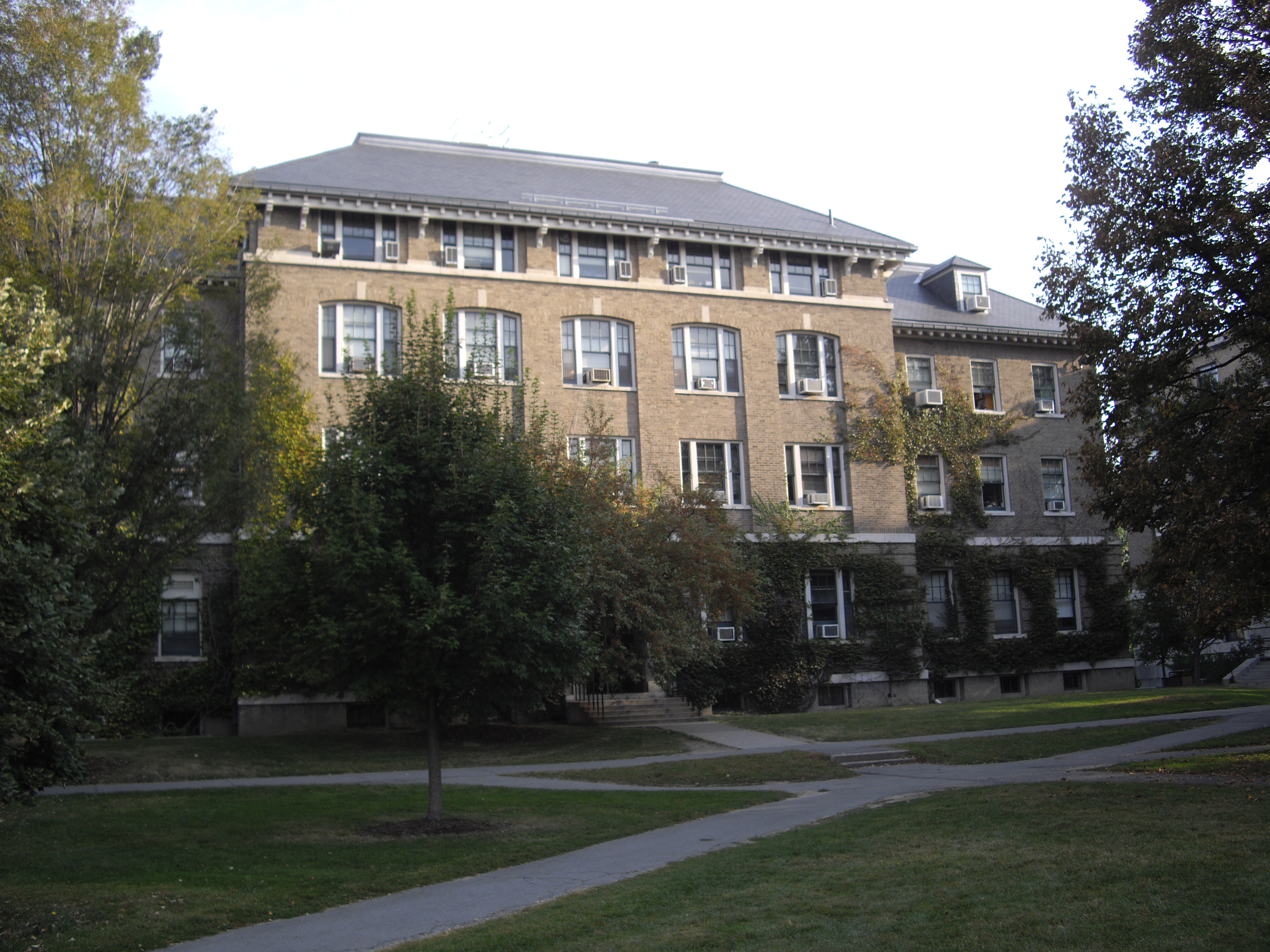

- Location within New York Location within the United States
- Location: Ithaca, New York
- Coordinates: 42°26′58.17″N 76°28′42.82″W
- Built: 1914
- Architect: Green & Wicks; Durolithic Co.
- Architectural style: Renaissance
- MPS: New York State College of Agriculture TR
- NRHP reference No.: 84003117
- Added to NRHP: September 24, 1984

Caldwell Hall, on the Cornell University campus, was added to the National Register of Historic Places in 1984. It was named after George Chapman Caldwell (1834–1907), the first head of the chemistry department at Cornell.
