= Emerald Square =

Emerald Square Mall
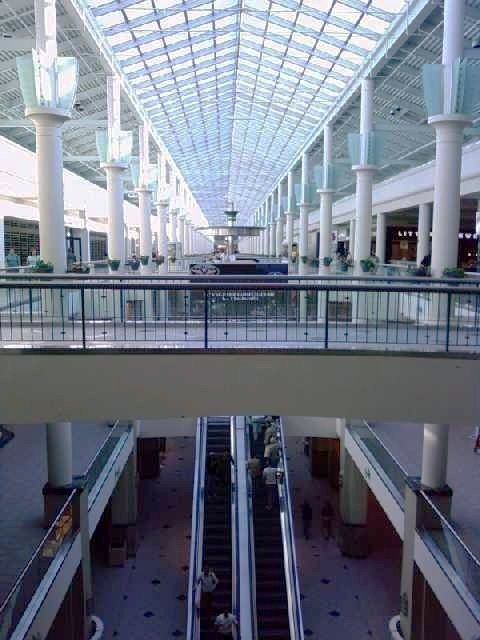
- Emerald Square Mall in October, 2008
- Location: North Attleborough, Massachusetts
- Coordinates: 41°56′46.84″N 71°21′01.07″W
- Address: 999 South Washington Street
- Opened: August 10, 1989; 37 years ago
- Developer: New England Development and The Pyramid Cos.
- Manager: Summit Properties USA
- Owner: Summit Properties USA
- Num. of stores: 126
- Num. of anchor tenants: 4 (3 open, 1 vacant)
- Floor area: 563,979 square feet (0.0523954 km2)
- Floors: 3
- Website: https://shopemeraldsquare.com

Emerald Square is a three-level enclosed shopping mall located in North Attleborough, Massachusetts, situated along U.S. Route 1 and I-295 near the Cumberland, Rhode Island, border. Opened in 1989, the mall has 563,979 square feet (0.0523954 km^{2}) of leasable retail space and primarily serves northern Bristol County, southern Norfolk County, and Providence County.

At its peak in the 1990s, Emerald Square housed more than 120 stores, including anchor tenants JCPenney, Sears, and G. Fox (Filene's). As of 2025, the mall is anchored by JCPenney and two Macy's stores, with the former Sears anchor space remaining vacant. Currently owned by Summit Properties USA, Emerald Square has experienced a decline in occupancy and foot traffic, with vacancy rates exceeding 50%.

== History ==
Emerald Square Mall was first conceived in the early 1980s as a joint venture between New England Development and The Pyramid Companies with the intention of creating a modern, multi-level shopping center that would function as a regional retail hub for the suburbs north of Providence, Rhode Island. The project emerged during a wave of "second generation" regional mall development between 1985 and 2000—a period that also saw the construction of other major malls in Massachusetts, including the Independence Mall (now Kingston Collection), the Berkshire Mall, and the Silver City Galleria. The chosen site in North Attleborough was largely undeveloped at the time, but its proximity to the junction of U.S. Route 1 and Interstate 295 was seen as offering enough market potential to support a large-scale retail complex.

Emerald Square Mall officially opened on August 10, 1989. The name "Emerald Square" is a reference chosen to coincide with the fiftieth anniversary of The Wizard of Oz film. At its opening, the mall featured approximately 4,350 parking spaces, including both multi-level parking garages and surface lots. The original anchor stores were JCPenney, Sears, and G. Fox, with Lechmere added as a fourth anchor in 1992. In 1993, the G. Fox store was rebranded as Filene's following corporate consolidation. Lechmere closed in 1997 after the chain was liquidated, and Lord & Taylor acquired the vacant space in 1998, and expanded it before opening the following year. Later in 1998, Pyramid sold its stake in the mall to New England Development, which then transferred the property to a joint venture led by Simon Property Group in 1999 as part of a broader portfolio sale. That same year, a carousel was installed in the food court.

Lord & Taylor closed its Emerald Square location in 2004 as part of a broader repositioning strategy. The vacated space was converted into a second Filene's store which opened in 2005. Following the merger of May Department Stores and Federated Department Stores, both Filene’s locations were rebranded as Macy’s in 2006; this made the mall distinctive for housing two separate Macy’s stores—one in the former G. Fox/Filene’s space and another in the former Lord & Taylor/Men’s & Home space—under the same roof. During this period, the mall had spurred commercial growth along the nearby Route 1 corridor, with the development of numerous strip malls and power centers surrounding the property.

== Decline ==
The Emerald Square Mall maintained popularity during the early 2000s and had maintained a 92% occupancy rate during this period—considered moderate by industry standards. Despite initial stability, by the mid 2000s increased competition from Wrentham Village Premium Outlets and Providence Place Mall was cited as significantly affecting tenant recruitment and retention. Compared to other malls in Simon Property Group’s portfolio, Emerald Square's per-square-foot sales were middling to declining. On June 14, 2007, the Massachusetts Appellate Tax Board determined that Emerald Square was overvalued and that economic conditions, property-specific challenges, and competitive pressures warranted a property tax reassessment at a lower valuation.

Occupancy at Emerald Square Mall continued to decline throughout the 2010s, with no meaningful recovery. Notable tenants such as the Disney Store and Olympia Sports closed during this period, contributing to the mall's growing number of vacancies. In March 2020, the mall temporarily closed in response to the COVID-19 pandemic; the mall would reopen in June 2020. On January 29, 2021, it was announced that Sears would be closing as part of a plan to close 23 stores nationwide; the store closed on April 18, 2021. In 2022, Simon officially transferred ownership of the mall to Kohan Retail Investment Group, a company known for acquiring and attempting to revitalize distressed malls across the United States. During this time, roughly 80% of the mall's parking structures were cordoned off due to deterioration.

In 2023, officials in North Attleborough proposed collaborating with a developer to convert the vacant Sears anchor at Emerald Square Mall into 320 to 340 apartment units. In addition to this proposal, the town expressed broader interest in pursuing a comprehensive redevelopment plan for the mall property. Potential ideas included transforming the site into a lifestyle-oriented mixed-use center with housing, developing a technology or life sciences park, creating a venue for sports teams, establishing an electric vehicle charging hub, and other adaptive reuses. The town opposed full demolition of the mall due to the potential costs associated with eminent domain. Instead, the preferred approach focused on renovating the existing mall structure and utilizing its expansive surface parking lots for infill development. However, the initial Sears apartment proposal would be abandoned later in 2023 after it was determined that the existing structure could not be feasibly adapted for residential use.

In September 2024, an incident occurred when eight bulls escaped a rodeo located at the Emerald Square parking lot, resulting in the temporary closure of Route 1. During this period, the mall’s exterior visibly deteriorated, with the façade becoming noticeably discolored and worn. As a result, residents of North Attleborough and surrounding communities increasingly viewed the mall as a source of blight. Over time, Emerald Square developed a growing reputation as a dead mall.

In February 2025, the mall experienced a significant water leak due to snow and ice accumulation, leading to a temporary closure. The North Attleboro Fire Department lifted the closure after ensuring there was no threat to public safety. In February 2025, State Representative Adam Scanlon filed a bill aimed at incentivizing mall owners to fill vacant spaces or repurpose properties, with the bill directed at the Emerald Square Mall property. The bill proposes allowing municipalities to collect property taxes on malls with occupancy rates below 67% for nine consecutive months, encouraging redevelopment or sale to more proactive owners.

In August 2025, Summit Properties USA announced its new ownership of Emerald Square following the acquisition of a majority stake in the mall. Summit indicated that it would continue operating the site as an indoor shopping mall.

== List of anchor stores ==
Name	No. of floors	Year opened	Year closed	Notes
Filene's	3	1993	2006	Replaced G. Fox
Filene's Men's and Home	2	2005	2006	Replaced Lord & Taylor
G. Fox	3	1989	1993	
JCPenney	3	1989		
Lechmere	2	1992	1997	
Lord & Taylor	2	1999	2004	Replaced Lechmere
Macy's	3	2006		Replaced Filene's
Macy's Men's and Home	2	2006		Replaced Filene's Men's and Home
Sears	3	1989	2021	

== See also ==
- Silver City Galleria former enclosed mall in Taunton, demolished
- Swansea Mall former enclosed mall in Swansea, under redevelopment
- New Harbour Mall former enclosed mall in Fall River, redeveloped into SouthCoast Marketplace
