= Tompkins Consolidated Area Transit =

Coordinates: 42°27′12″N 76°30′20″W

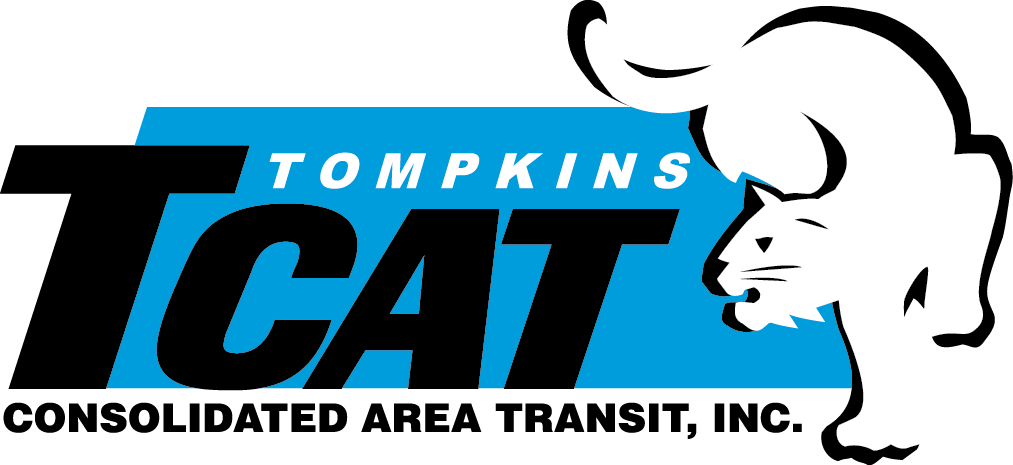
- Founded: 1998
- Headquarters: 737 Willow Ave.
- Locale: Ithaca, New York
- Service area: Tompkins County, New York
- Service type: bus service, paratransit
- Routes: 34 bus routes
- Hubs: Commons (Green St., Seneca St., Albany St.); Cornell University; Ithaca Mall
- Fleet: 54 vehicles
- Daily ridership: 8,000 (weekdays, Q2 2026)
- Annual ridership: 2,488,000 (2025)
- Fuel type: Diesel, Battery Electric
- Operator: TCAT, Inc. (fixed routes); GADABOUT (paratransit)
- Chief executive: Matthew Rosenbloom
- Website: tcatbus.com

Tompkins Consolidated Area Transit, Inc., usually referred to as TCAT, is a private, non-profit public transportation operator, created by Cornell University, Tompkins County, and the City of Ithaca to serve Tompkins County, New York. The vast majority of TCAT bus routes are based in the City of Ithaca and surrounding urban area. These routes serve Ithaca College, Cornell University, and Tompkins Cortland Community College. In 2025, the system had a ridership of 2,488,000, or about 8,000 per weekday as of the second quarter of 2026.

As of 2019, TCAT operates 34 bus routes. Door to door paratransit service is provided by GADABOUT Transportation Services, Inc.

== History ==
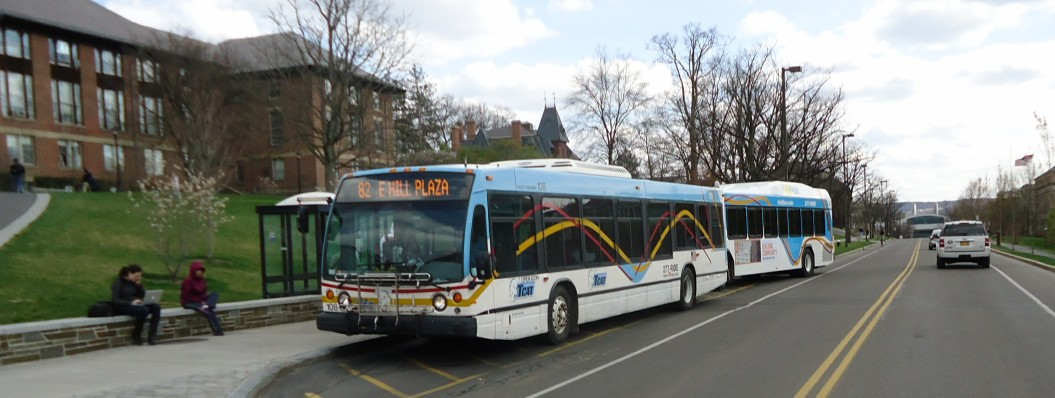
TCAT buses on Cornell's campus

Tompkins Consolidated Area Transit (TCAT) was formed in 1998 by consolidating three public transit systems – Ithaca Transit (City of Ithaca), TOMTRAN (Tompkins County) and CU Transit (Cornell University) into a single system. In the 1960s the City and Cornell established independent bus systems which expanded throughout the next two decades. Service was first extended to serve Ithaca's suburbs in the 1970s, and to rural towns beginning in 1982. In 1974, a transit service in Northeast Ithaca (Lansing, Cayuga Heights and the Town of Ithaca) was started by apartment owners contracting with Swarthout Coaches to operate limited service for Cornell students, and as the public demand for service increased, the apartment owners sought assistance from local governments and Cornell University, which became Northeast Transit in 1978.

Tompkins County became involved in supporting suburban routes and in developing rural transit service. The County formed TOMTRAN to extend fixed-route bus service to Dryden, Caroline and Newark Valley in 1982, Groton (1983), Newfield and Ulysses (1985), and Lansing and Danby (1991). In 1999, TCAT initiated bus service to Enfield, the last unserved town in the county. In 1992, the city, Cornell and County built a $5 million transit facility to base transit operations and fleet maintenance including GADABOUT. In 1996, the New York State Legislature adopted a state law authorizing that "the county of Tompkins, the city of Ithaca and Cornell University may jointly provide for mass transportation services in the county of Tompkins.", and on April 1, 1998, the City of Ithaca, Cornell University and Tompkins County established TCAT as a joint venture (public entity) to operate public transit service in Tompkins County, service began in 1999, establishing a unified route and fare system. TCAT re-organized itself as a 501(c)(3) nonprofit corporation, TCAT. Inc. in 2005 with representatives of City of Ithaca, Cornell University, and Tompkins County serving on its board of directors.

In 1976, a consortium of municipalities and human service agencies formed GADABOUT Transportation Services to address travel needs of seniors and people with disabilities and today operates the Federally mandated paratransit service for Tompkins County. Although GADABOUT did not join TCAT in 1998, the two companies are still closely related, with GADABOUT leasing space and maintenance services from TCAT.

== Routes ==
As of Fall 2026, TCAT operates the following routes.

=== Urban and suburban services ===
Route #	Route name	Days of service	Notes
10	Downtown–Cornell Loop	Monday–Friday	Loop between Ithaca Commons and Cornell University.
11	South Hill + Ithaca College	Monday–Sunday	Serves Ithaca College, South Hill and Downtown Ithaca.
11S	Ithaca College / South Hill Shopper	Saturday–Sunday	Weekend shopper service linking Ithaca College and South Hill with southwest shopping.
13	Fall Creek + Northside	Monday–Sunday	Serves Fall Creek, Northside, Stewart Park and Downtown Ithaca.
14	West Hill + Hospital	Monday–Sunday	Serves West Hill and Cayuga Medical Center.
14S	West Hill Shopper	Monday–Saturday	Connects West Hill neighborhoods with southwest shopping.
15	Southside Shopping	Monday–Sunday	Serves Southside and southwest shopping. Many trips interline with Route 32.
17	TCAT + Fall Creek + Commons	Monday–Sunday	Connects the TCAT facility, Fall Creek and Ithaca Commons.
30	Ithaca Mall via Cornell	Monday–Friday	Weekday service between Downtown Ithaca, Cornell and The Shops at Ithaca Mall.
30W	Ithaca Mall via Cornell	Saturday–Sunday	Weekend variant of Route 30, serving Cornell West Campus instead of Central Campus.
31	Etna	Monday–Friday	Weekday service between Cornell, Winston Court, the Lab of Ornithology and Etna.
31W	Etna	Saturday–Sunday	Weekend variant of Route 31, with service extended to Downtown Ithaca.
32	Airport via Cornell	Monday–Sunday	Connects Downtown Ithaca and Cornell with Ithaca Tompkins International Airport.
51	Eastern Heights via Cornell	Monday–Sunday	Serves Downtown Ithaca, Cornell, East Hill Plaza and Eastern Heights.

=== Rural services (former TOMTRAN routes) ===
Route #	Route name	Days of service	Notes
20	Enfield	Monday–Saturday	Connects Enfield with Downtown Ithaca; select weekday trips serve Cornell.
21	Trumansburg	Monday–Sunday	Connects Trumansburg and Jacksonville with Downtown Ithaca; select weekday trips serve Cornell.
36	Lansing / Shops at Ithaca Mall / Campus	Monday–Friday	Serves Lansing, the Ithaca Mall area and Cornell.
37	Lansing via Warren	Monday–Sunday	Connects Downtown Ithaca and Cornell with Warren Road and Lansing.
40	Freeville + Groton	Monday–Sunday	Connects Downtown Ithaca with Freeville and Groton.
43	Dryden–TC3	Monday–Sunday	Connects Downtown Ithaca with Dryden and Tompkins Cortland Community College.
43G	Dryden–TC3–Freeville–Groton	Monday–Sunday	Designation used for select Route 43 trips continuing beyond TC3 to Freeville and Groton.
52	Brooktondale + Slaterville Springs	Monday–Sunday	Serves Brooktondale, Caroline and Slaterville Springs; select trips serve Cornell.
65	Danby	Monday–Friday	Connects Danby with Downtown Ithaca; select trips serve Ithaca College and Cornell.
67	Newfield	Monday–Sunday	Connects Newfield with Downtown Ithaca; select weekday trips serve Cornell.

=== Seasonal services ===
Routes 22 and 23 operate only during TCAT's summer service period.

Route #	Route name	Days of service	Notes
22	Summer parks route	Monday–Friday (summer only)	Serves area parks and the Cayuga Nature Center, including Taughannock Falls State Park.
23	Summer parks route	Saturday–Sunday (summer only)	Weekend service to Taughannock Falls, Robert H. Treman and Buttermilk Falls state parks.

=== Cornell University campus services (former CU Transit routes) ===
Route #	Route name	Days of service	Notes
81	Cornell Campus Circulator	Monday–Friday	Serves A Lot, Hasbrouck Apartments, North Campus and Central Campus.
82	Cornell–East Hill Loop	Monday–Friday	Connects Cornell Central Campus with East Hill Plaza.
90	Downtown–Cornell Nights	Monday–Sunday	Night service between Downtown Ithaca, Collegetown and Cornell.
92	Cornell Evening & Night	Monday–Sunday	Evening and night service Monday–Saturday; daytime Cornell service on Sunday.

== Fleet ==
TCAT operates a mix of fifty-one 35 ft and 40 ft transit buses and three small 14-seat buses. All TCAT buses are wheelchair accessible. The fleet is composed of vehicles manufactured by Gillig, New Flyer Industries, and Orion Bus Industries.

In March 2024, TCAT pulled all 7 Proterra battery-electric buses due to its build defects. In response, TCAT has received 5 hybrid buses from CDTA in Albany, as well as ordering 5 new diesel and 6 new battery-electric buses from Gillig, all of which has entered service. Two additional hybrid buses from the same manufacturer will arrive by 2026.

=== Current fleet ===
Fleet number(s)	Year	Photos	Manufacturer	Model	Engine	Transmission	Notes
1110–1116	2011		Orion	VII EPA10 (07.501)	Cummins ISL9	Allison B400R	1115 written off after a fire in 2018
1501–1502	2015		Gillig	Low Floor 40	Cummins ISL9	Allison B500R	
1601–1605	2016		Gillig	Low Floor 40	Cummins ISL9	Allison B500R	
1801–1811	2017		Gillig	Low Floor 40	Cummins L9	Allison B500R	
1901–1909	2018		New Flyer	XD40	Cummins L9	Allison B400R	
1910–1912	2019		Freightliner	S2 35	Cummins L9	Allison 2500 PTS	
2101-2102	2021		New Flyer	XD40	Cummins L9	Allison B400R	
2103-2110	2021		Proterra	ZX5			Removed from service indefinitely due to build quality issues
2201-2202	2022		Ford	E450			
2501-2505	2025		Gillig	Low Floor 40	Cummins L9	Allison B500R	
2506-2511	2025		Gillig	Low Floor EV 40			Replacement for out-of-service Proterra buses
2601-2602	2026		Gillig	Low Floor 40 Hybrid	Cummins L9	Allison eGen Flex H 40 hybrid system	
4053, 4055	2010		Gillig	Low Floor 40 Hybrid	Cummins ISL9	Allison H 40 EP hybrid system	Former CDTA buses
5502-5503, 5508	2009		Gillig	BRT 40 Hybrid	Cummins ISL	Allison E^{P}40 hybrid system	Former CDTA buses

=== Past Fleet ===
Fleet number(s)	Year	Photos	Manufacturer	Model	Engine	Transmission	Notes
201-209	2002		New Flyer	D40LF	Detroit Diesel Series 40	Allison B400R	
601–608	2006		Gillig	Low Floor 40	Cummins ISL	Allison B500R	
610–612	2006		Ford	E450			
613–614	2006		Gillig	Low Floor 40 Hybrid	Cummins ISL	Allison E^{P}40 hybrid system	
701–703	2007		Gillig	Low Floor 40 Hybrid	Cummins ISL	Allison E^{P}40 hybrid system	
901–902	2010		Gillig	Low Floor 40	Cummins ISL9	Allison B500R	
1102–1103	2011		Gillig	Low Floor 40 Hybrid	Cummins ISL9	Allison H 40 EP hybrid system	
1104-1109, 1118	2011		Gillig	Low Floor 40	Cummins ISL9	Allison B500R	
2506	2005		Gillig	Low Floor 40	Cummins ISL 8.3L diesel	Allison B400R	Ex-Harrisburg, PA

== Fares ==
TCAT charges an adult fare at $1.50 for all trips. Cash customers are entitled to one free transfer upon request. Seniors and those with disabilities pay half-fare, as do children under 18. Additionally, up to three children, aged five or younger, travel free with an adult.

== Historical images ==
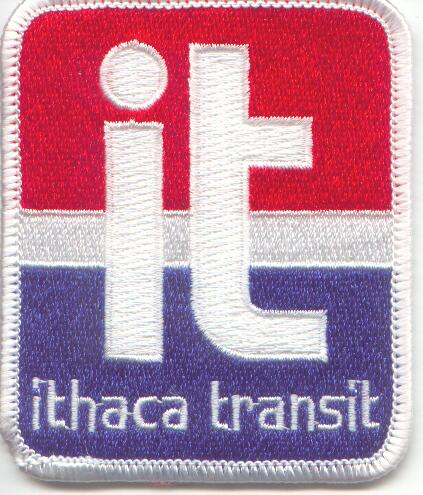
Ithaca Transit Patch

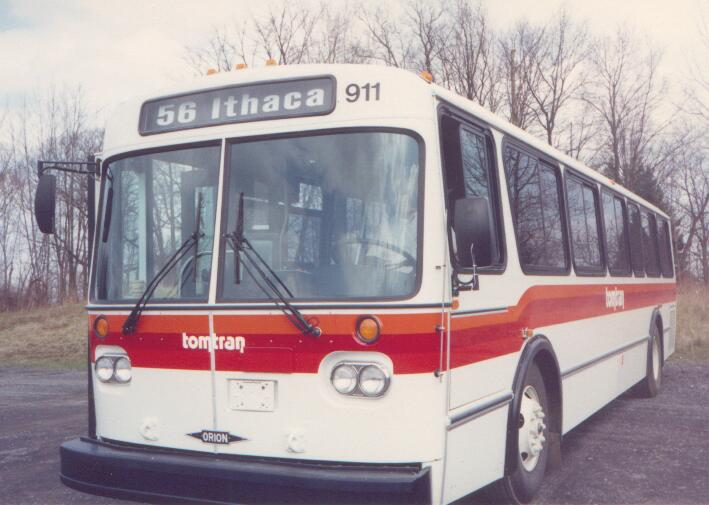
TOMTRAN Bus 1991

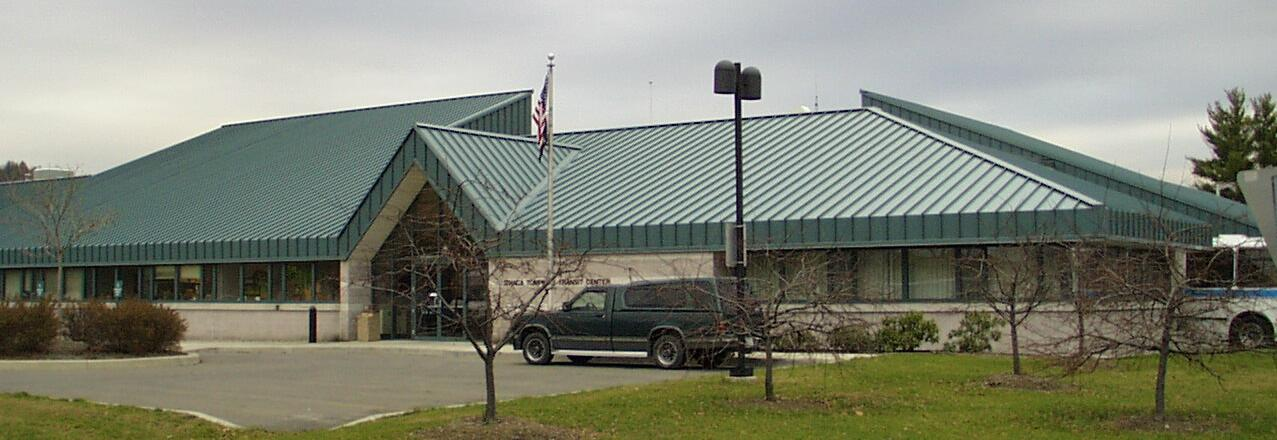
TCAT Facility (Depot)

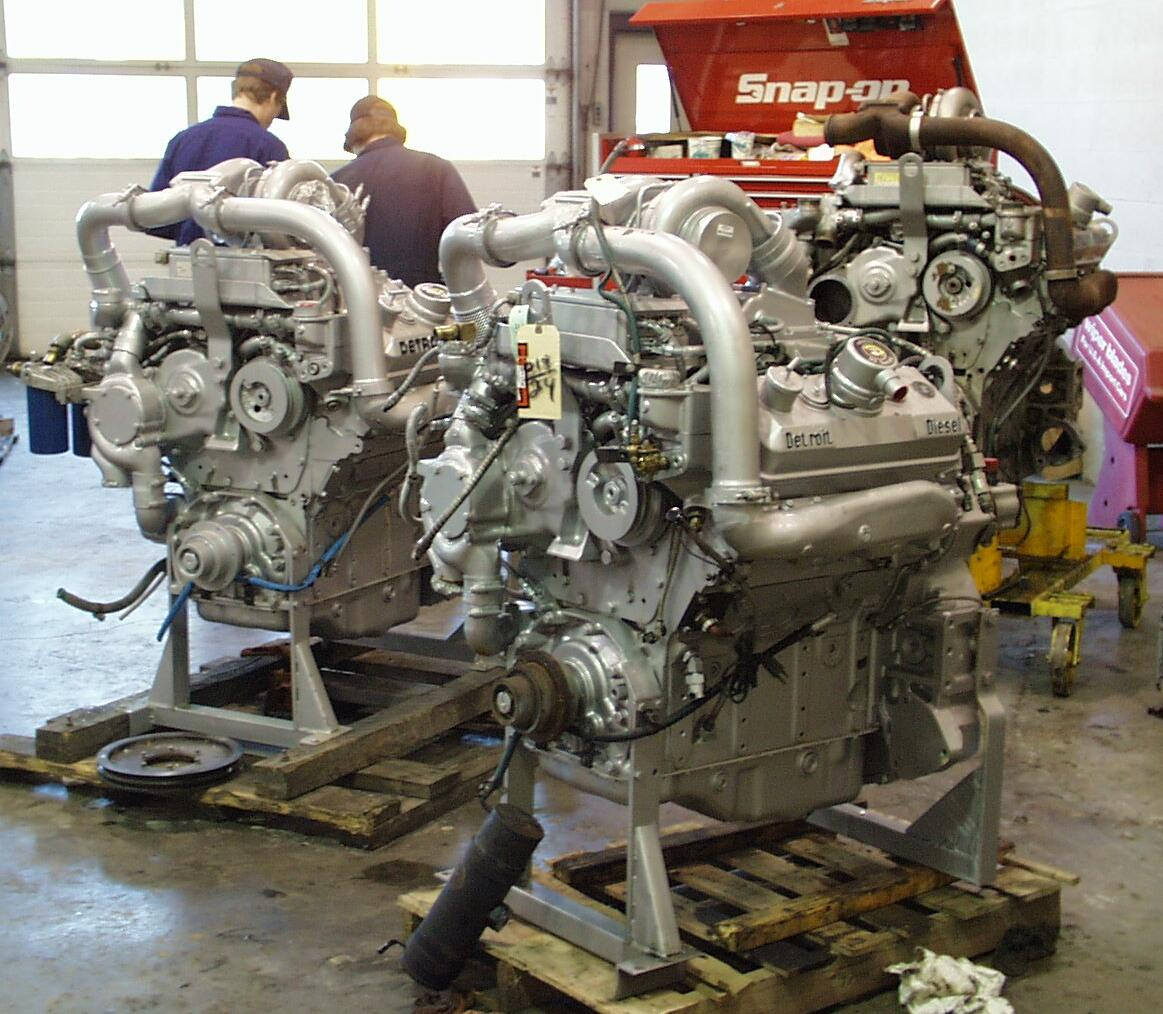

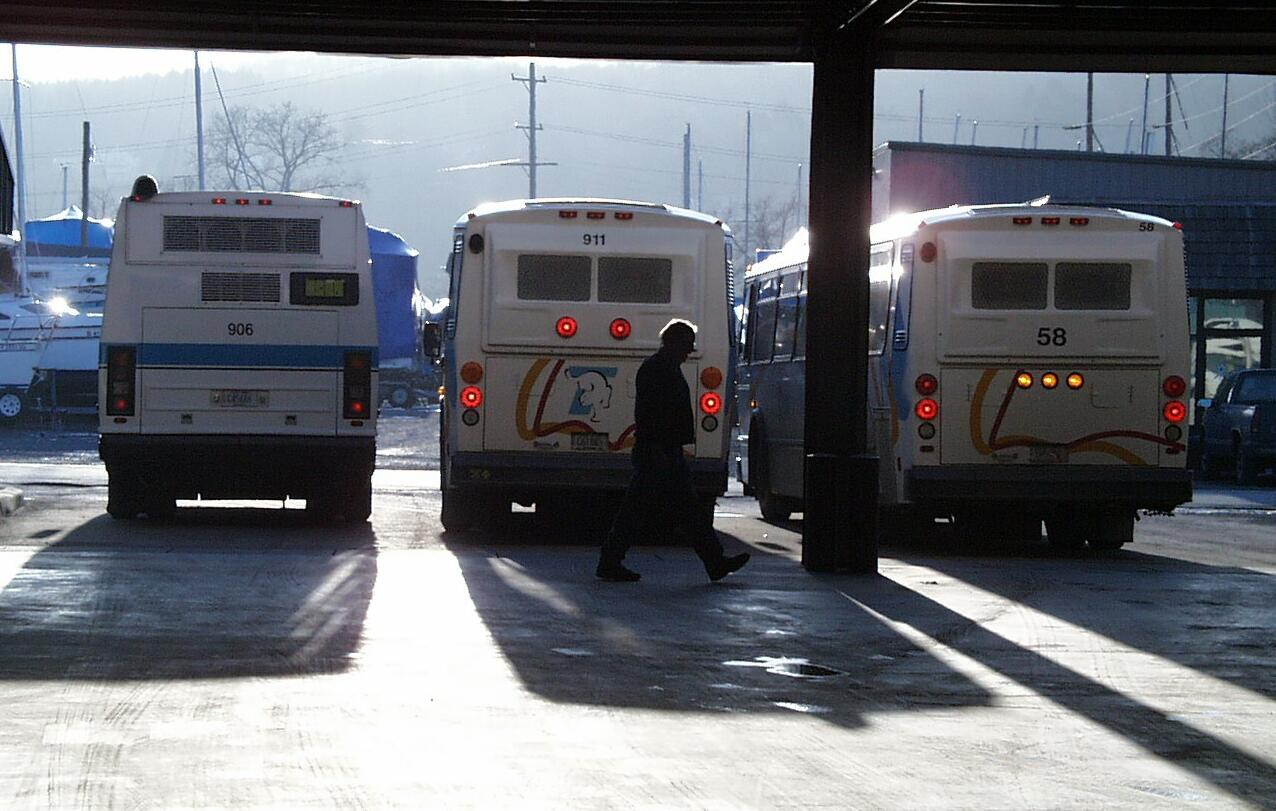

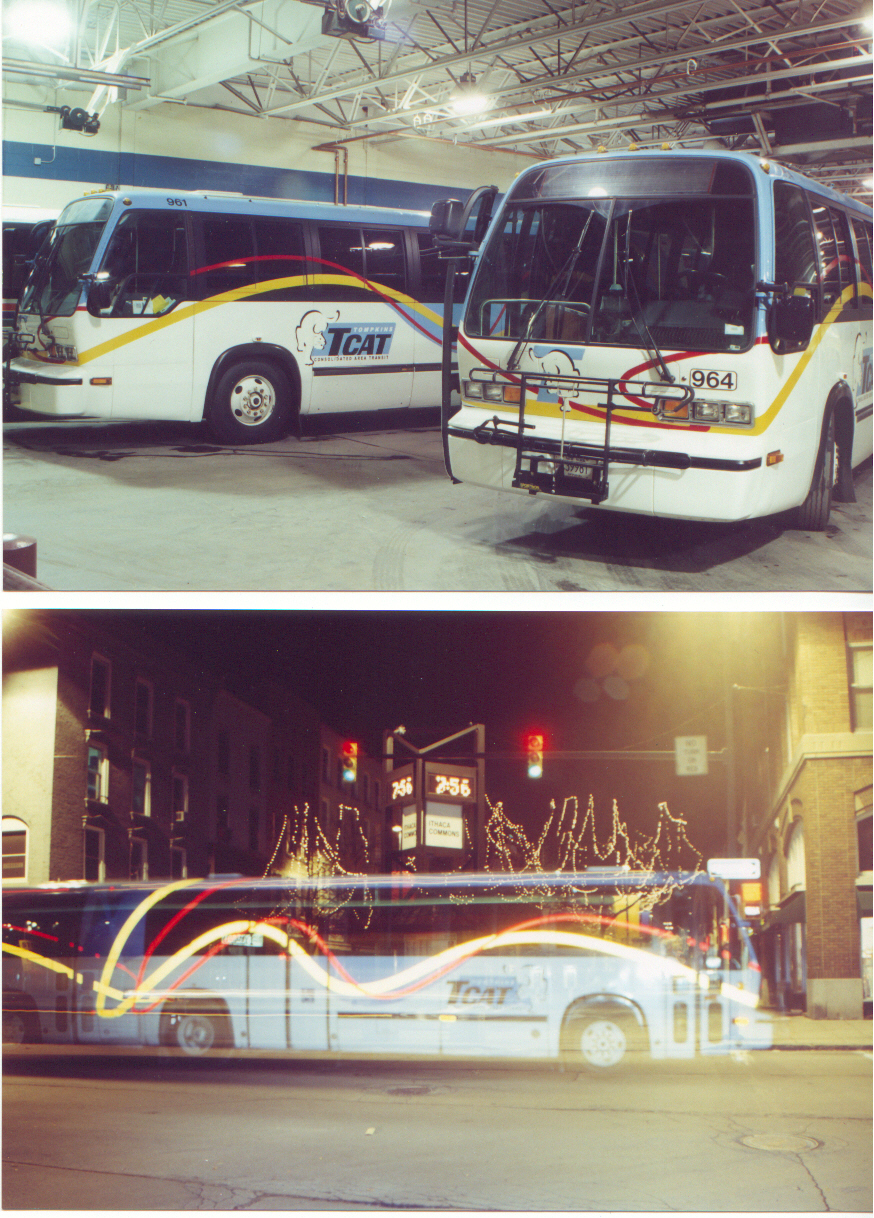
TCAT scheme at night
