= Ithaca Bus Station =

Bus station in Ithaca, New York, United States

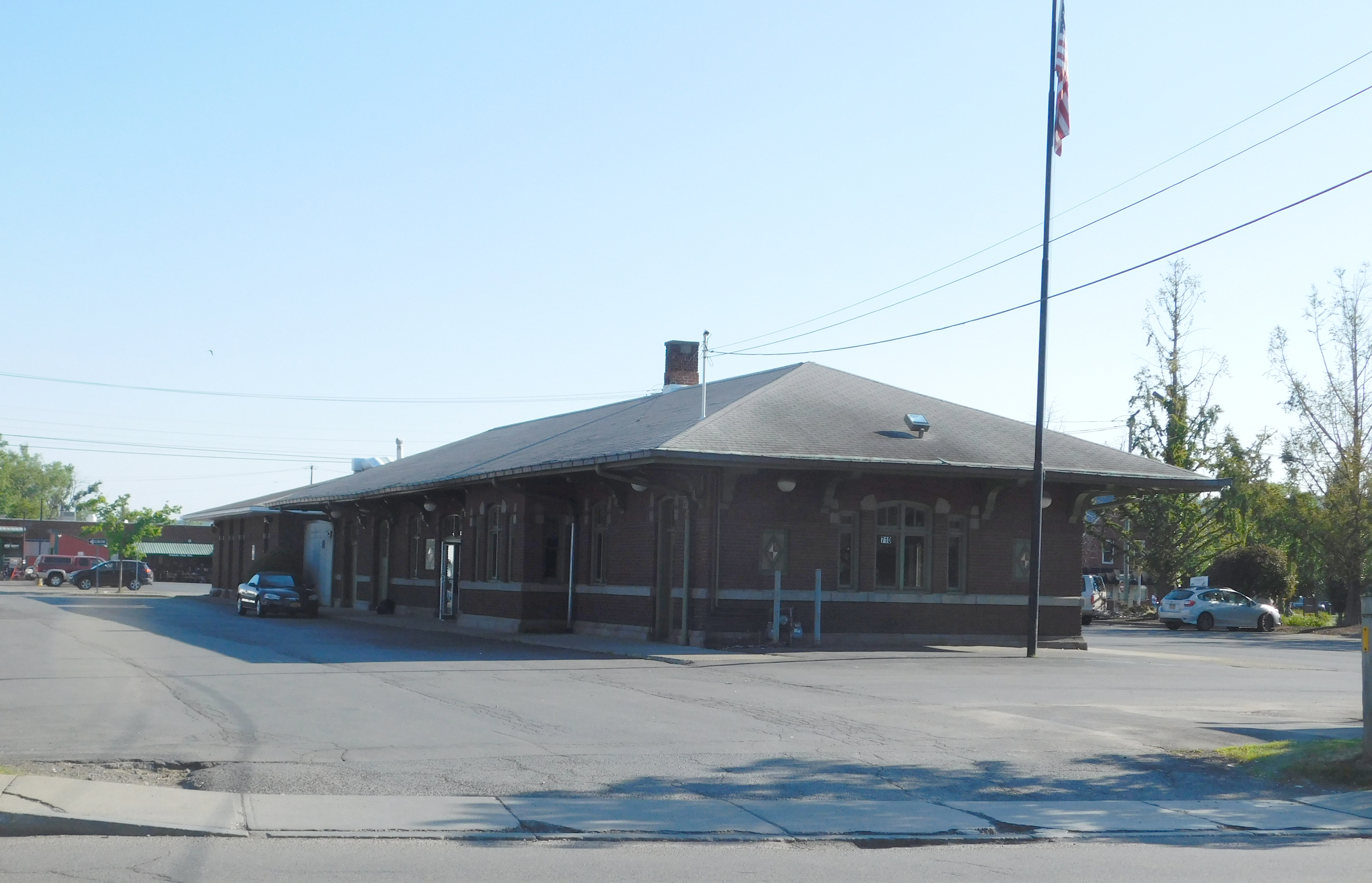
- The Station in June 2018

General information
- Location: 710 W State St., Ithaca, NY 14850; United States
- Coordinates: 42.439641°N 76.511066°W
- Bus routes: 5
- Bus operators: Chenango Valley Bus Lines; Greyhound Lines; ShortLine Coach USA; Trailways of New York
- Connections: Tompkins Consolidated Area Transit: Route 14 outbound; Route 14 inbound at State St. @ Fulton St.; Route 20 / 21 outbound at Seneca St. @ Fulton St.

Construction
- Parking: Yes

Other information
- Website: Ithaca New York Bus Station

History
- Closed: October 28
Location
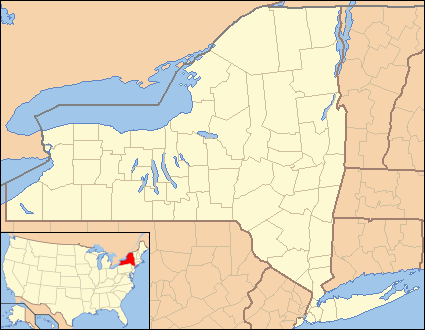
- Location within New York

Ithaca Bus Station, also referred to as Ithaca Bus Terminal, is an intercity bus station in Ithaca, the county seat and only city in Tompkins County, New York. The Prairie-style building, located west of North Fulton Street between West Seneca Street and West State Street, was designed by architect Frank J. Nies in 1912 as a train station of the Delaware, Lackawanna and Western Railroad. DL&W ceased passenger operations in 1942, and Greyhound Bus Lines acquired the station in 1967. The station building accommodates waiting area with seats, ticketing and package express office, and restrooms.
The station closed in October, 2018 due to construction, retirement of the station operators, and changing infrastructure in the area. Buses are now boarding downtown (at 131 East Green Street) for the time being until long-term plans are made. The City of Ithaca designated the station as a local landmark in January, 2019.

== Bus lines ==
Ithaca Bus Station was served by the following intercity bus lines:

- Chenango Valley Bus Lines
- Greyhound Lines
- ShortLine Coach USA
- Trailways of New York

== Bus routes ==
The station was on the Greyhound routes from New York City to Buffalo or Rochester daily, and from Syracuse to Elmira daily. It was also on the ShortLine route from New York or Binghamton to Cornell North Campus (CC Lot) daily, New York to Ithaca College (Park Communications Bldg.), and Albany to Cornell North Campus. The Greyhound routes operated by Trailways of New York were not available on the operator Trailways' official website.

Stop	Route	Destination / description	Notes
Greyhound Lines stand	New York–Rochester–Buffalo	to New York (Port Authority) via Binghamton (BC Junction) and Scranton (Scranton Bus Sta.)	■ Daily (Schedule 231NYT); 5 hours 0 minutes; US$40.00–; ■ Daily (212); 5 hours 55 minutes; US$42.00–; ■ Th. and Sa. (4263NYT) /; Fr. and Su. (4269); 5 hours 0 minutes; US$48:00–
Greyhound Lines stand	New York–Rochester–Buffalo	to Buffalo (Metro Transp. Ctr.) via Geneva (Smoke Shop), Rochester (Trailways Bus Sta.), and Batavia (48 Deli Express)	■ Daily (300); 3 hours 40 minutes; US$32.00–
Greyhound Lines stand	New York–Rochester–Buffalo	to Buffalo via Geneva, Rochester, Batavia, and Buffalo Airport	■ Daily (246NYT); 3 hours 40 minutes; US$30.00–
Greyhound Lines stand	New York–Rochester–Buffalo	to Rochester via Geneva	■ Fr. and Su. (4258NYT); 1 hour 55 minutes; US$24.00–; ■ Th. and Sa. (4268); 2 hours 0 minutes; US$22.00–
Greyhound Lines stand	Syracuse–Ithaca–Elmira	to Syracuse (William F. Walsh Regional Transportation Center) via Dryden, Cortland SUNY, Cortland (Cortland County Office Bldg.), and Syracuse Destiny USA	■ Daily (960NYT) †1; 1 hour 25 minutes; US$15.00–; ■ Daily (966NYT) †1; 1 hour 20 minutes; US$15.00–
Greyhound Lines stand	Syracuse–Ithaca–Elmira	to Elmira (Elmira Transp. Ctr. Trailways)	■ Daily (969NYT) †1; 50 minutes; US$9.00
ShortLine Coach USA stand	Ithaca Platinum	to New York (40th St. & 8th Ave.)	■ Mo.–Fr, Su. †2; 4 hours 50 minutes; US$50.00
ShortLine Coach USA stand	X-178	to New York (Port Authority) via Owego (Smoke Shop) and Binghamton (BC Junction)	■ Fr. and Su. (Schedule 131) †3†4; Friday Sunday Non-Stop Express; 5 hours 5 minutes; US$54.50
ShortLine Coach USA stand	X-178	to New York via Binghamton (BC Junction) and Monticello (ShortLine Coach USA)	■ Daily (96) †3†4†5; Bing'ton NYC Comm. Special; 5 hours 20 minutes; US$54.50
ShortLine Coach USA stand	X-178	to New York via Whitney Point, Binghamton, Monticello, and Ridgewood (Park & Ride)	■ Daily (100 / 116) †3†4; ■ Daily (102) †3†4†5; 5 hours 0 minutes; US$54.50; ■ Daily (122) †3†4; 5 hours 5 minutes; US$54.50
ShortLine Coach USA stand	X-178	to New York via Owego, Binghamton, Monticello, and Ridgewood	■ Daily (108) †3†4†5; 5 hours 15 minutes; US$54.50
ShortLine Coach USA stand	X-178 (Binghamton–Ithaca)	to Binghamton via Owego	■ Daily (104CVB / 118CVB) †4 †Schedule 104CVB and 118CVB connect 106 and 124 each for New York; 1 hours 10 minutes; US$54.50
ShortLine Coach USA stand	88	to Albany (Trailways Greyhound Sta) via Binghamton (BC Junction), Oneonta (Oneonta Bus Terminal), SUNY Cobleskill, Schenectady (Schenectady Bus Station), SUNY Albany, and Albany (SUNY Circle)	■ Daily (132) †4†5; 5 hours 10 minutes
NYT: operated by Trailways of New York; CVB: operated by Chenango Valley Bus Lines; †1: Connections only on the Greyhound's official website; †2: Free snack and drink service; †3: Student discounts are available from US$45.00; †4: Wi-Fi may not be available; †5: Transfer may be necessary at Binghamton;

== Connecting transportation ==
The Route 14 (West Hill–Hospital–Commons) of Tompkins Consolidated Area Transit (TCAT) served Ithaca Bus Station at a curbside stop, bounding for Cayuga Medical Center daily, while the route also serves the bus station at State Street and Fulton Street, a curbside stop across State Street, for Green Street at Ithaca Commons daily.

TCAT Route 20 (Enfield–Commons) and 21 (Trumansburg–Commons) also serves the station at Seneca Street and Fulton Street, a curbside stop across Seneca Street, for Enfield Highway Department and Aubles Trailer Park in Trumansburg daily.
