= Ithaca Commons =

Place of local interest in New York State

Coordinates: 42°26′22″N 76°29′50″W

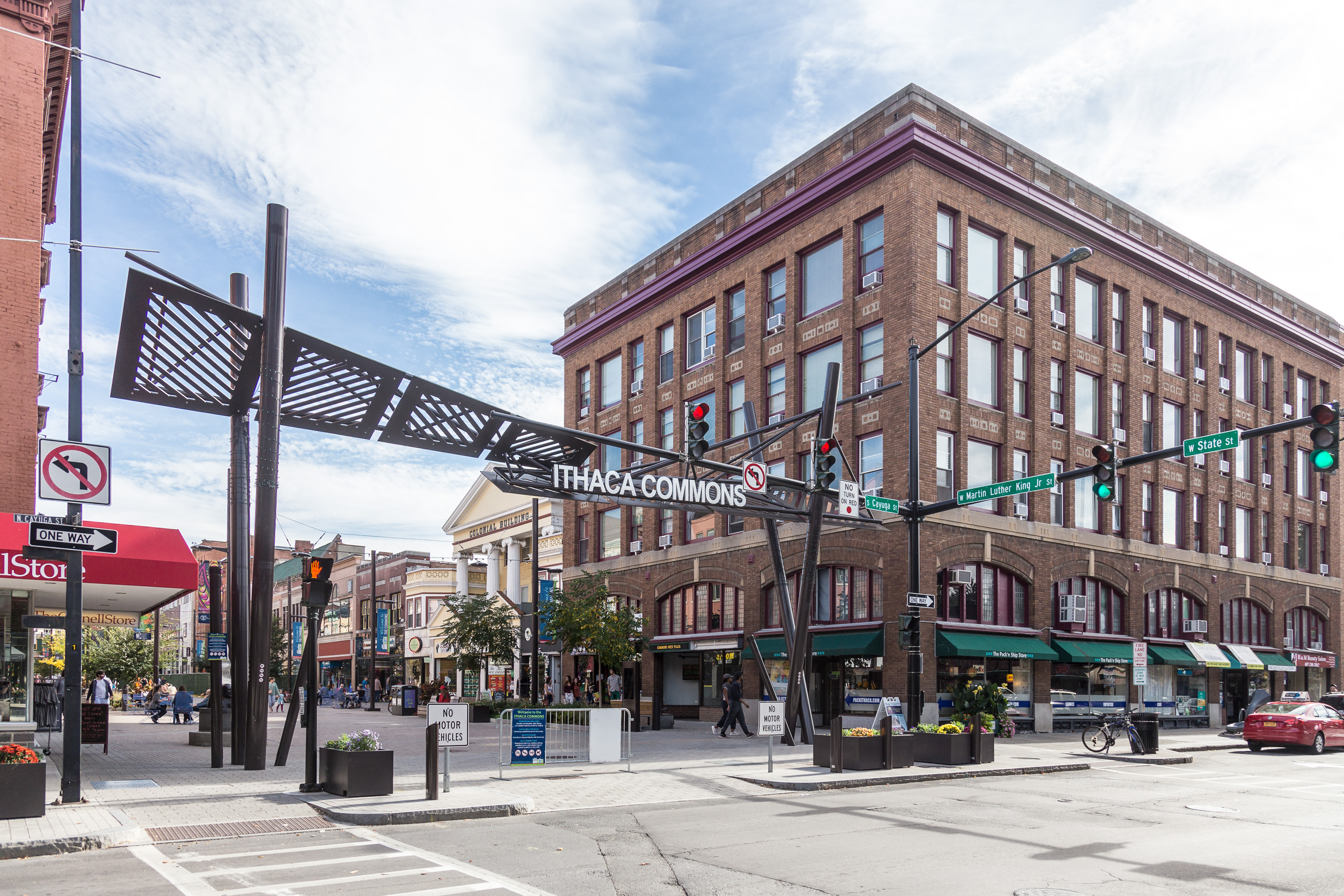
Ithaca Commons west entrance, at Cayuga Street

The Ithaca Commons is a two-block pedestrian mall in the business improvement district known as Downtown Ithaca that serves as the city's cultural and economic center. The Commons is a popular regional destination, and is filled with upscale restaurants and shops, public art, and frequent community festivals.

== About ==
The Commons is shaped like an inverted T. It consists of a two-block segment of State Street between Cayuga and Aurora Streets lined with shops, galleries, restaurants, and bars, and a smaller one-block segment, "Bank Alley," extending north up Tioga Street to Seneca Street, that is home to several banks and financial institutions. Many of the buildings are mixed-use, with apartments or offices on the upper floors. Tompkins Cortland Community College has a small satellite campus on the Commons.

During the summer, local musicians and other entertainers put on free concerts and performances, including at the Bernie Milton Pavilion named after local musician Bernie Milton. The Commons is also used for many political protests, rallies, and speeches.

The Commons hosts several festivals throughout the year, including Ithaca's main annual festival, the Ithaca Festival in early June.

A scale model of the Solar System, the Sagan Planet Walk, begins in the Commons. The Planet Walk is named after famed Cornell University astronomer Carl Sagan, and stretches 0.75 miles (1,210 m) from to the Sciencenter. The inner ring planets all fit on a short section of Bank Alley.

The two main hubs of Tompkins Consolidated Area Transit (TCAT)'s bus network are located adjacent to the Commons.

== History ==
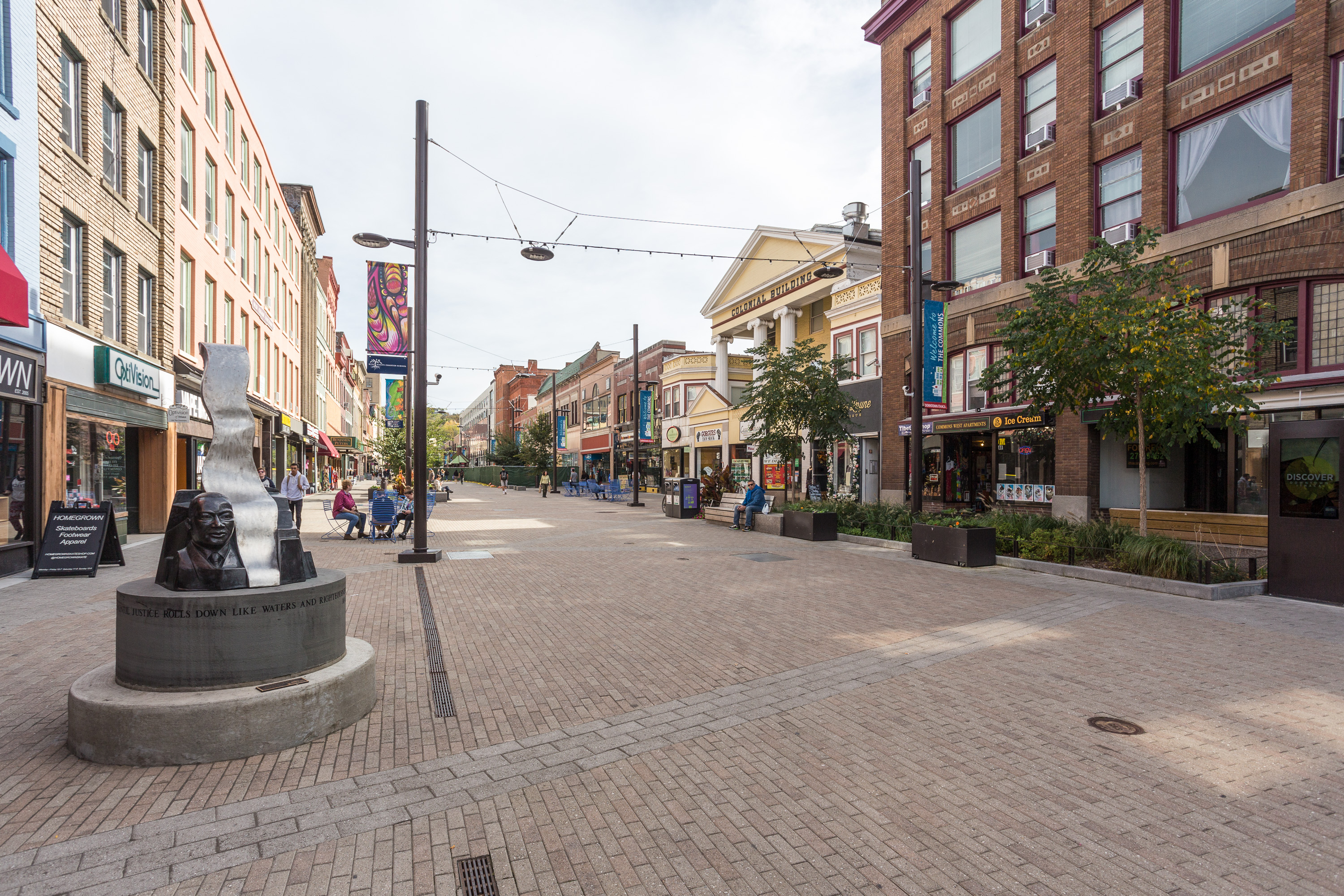
Ithaca Commons looking east from Cayuga Street with a Martin Luther King Jr. sculpture on the left

By the 1960s, the rise of car culture, suburbs, and urban renewal had severely hurt downtown Ithaca. Many storefronts were empty, and many historic buildings had been torn down and replaced with vacant lots. In 1971, newly elected Mayor Ed Conley, "pulling on a 1950s-era suggestion from a Cornell city planning student", proposed converting several blocks of State Street into a pedestrian mall. At the time, many small towns in the United States were experimenting with using pedestrian malls to revive downtowns. Formal design began in 1972, under the direction of local architect Anton J. Egner. Construction began in 1974, and the Commons opened in 1975. It cost $1.13 million The name "The Commons" was the winning entry in a community-wide "name the mall" contest, and a prize of $1,000 in cash and gift certificates went to Ithaca High School senior Bill Ryan who had entered the name after a visit to the Boston Common. The reason for Ithaca's added "S" is unclear.

It faced immediate competition, with the Ithaca area's first mall opening the next year in Lansing. In 1981, several vacant lots created by urban renewal were filled by the construction of Center Ithaca, a large mixed-use building with first-floor retail, an indoor food court connected to the Commons, and upper-floor offices and apartments.

Together with the rest of Upstate New York, the Commons suffered through the 1990s with many empty storefronts. Rothschilds, a local department store, closed in the early 1980s, and its successors, Iszards (the only store outside of the Elmira area) and a McCurdy's store, closed in the mid-1990s. A McDonald's and a CVS also closed on the Commons in the mid-90s, and a block away, a Woolworths store closed in 1998. Then-Mayor Alan Cohen (owner of a restaurant located on the Commons) proposed removing the Commons and opening up the two-block portion of State Street to automobile traffic.

Panorama of the Commons before its reconstruction. The Sun from the Carl Sagan Planet Walk can be seen on both sides.

At the turn of the century, the Commons's fortune began to turn around, due to increased investment and the rise of New Urbanism. The Downtown Ithaca Alliance, a business improvement district, was created in 1997 to revitalize the Commons and its surroundings. The vacant former Woolworths was renovated into the new home of the Tompkins County Public Library in 2000. In 2005, Seneca Place, a large mixed-use building incorporating retail, a Hilton Garden Inn, office space for Cornell University and Morgan Stanley, and the Ithaca area's first Starbucks opened adjacent to the Commons. Between 2003 and 2015, the Cayuga Green project replaced several lots of surface parking adjacent to the Commons with a new home for independent movie theatre Cinemapolis, two buildings of luxury apartments, and a new multi-level parking garage with first-floor retail. Another luxury apartment building, Gateway Commons, was completed nearby in 2007.

But the Commons' aging infrastructure started to cause problems. In the late 1990s, an ad hoc city committee formed to discuss the future of the Commons. Their report, "Renewing the Design of the Ithaca Commons: The Report of The Commons Design Review Committee," was released in April 1999, and led to a $127,000 capital project. The project consisted largely of maintenance work, although it also paid for the removal of a large, brutalist fountain that had been turned off for years due to leaky plumbing. The fountain was replaced with a large, open paved area with seating. More temporary repairs were made to the Commons in 2008.

In 2009, the city commissioned landscape architecture firm Sasaki Associates to do a complete redesign, with a more open central lane, "patterned pavement, varied and movable seating, improved performance spaces, energy-efficient lighting, an outdoor reading area and a small playground."

The old Commons was demolished in April 2013. The reconstruction was originally planned to take 18 months and cost $9.5 million. But a series of problems, including a poorly-documented existing conditions, poorly-drawn plans, poor coordination with NYSEG, and mayhem caused by a runaway truck, caused the project to go long over schedule and budget. Many business owners reported dramatically decreased sales and foot traffic. In August 2015, the Commons re-opened, at a total cost of $15 million.

In 2012, a stainless steel and bronze sculpture of Martin Luther King Jr. was unveiled at the western end of the Commons. The sculpture, by Rob Licht, depicts a portrait bust of King with an abstracted image of a waterfall. The base of the statue is etched with a quotation from King.

In late 2015, construction began on a new, ten-story Marriott hotel on a vacant triangular lot at the eastern end of the Commons. The hotel opened in November 2016.

In 2013, a local developer proposed replacing three buildings on the Commons with modern retail spaces, three stories of office space, and an eleven-story apartment tower. The project, named "Harold's Square," would also result in the historic rehabilitation of the 19th-century Sage Block building. The project was expected to be completed in summer 2019, but was still under construction in August 2020, when the developer sued the city in an effort to stop another project in the area, concerned that they would lose revenue due to competition for parking.

In 2022, a building that once housed Firebrand Books - a building on the Commons, at 143 East State Street - was designated a local historic landmark by the Ithaca Common Council.

== Features ==
- Sagan Planet Walk
- Bernie Milton Pavilion
- State Theatre

== Annual Events ==
- Annual Chili Festival (late winter)
- Ithaca Festival (first weekend of June)
- Bite of Ithaca (late June)
- Apple Harvest Festival (first weekend of October)
- Winter Light Festival (first weekend of December)
- Chowder Cook-Off (December)
- First Friday Gallery Nights (first Friday of each month)
- Summer Concert Series (Thursday evenings during the summer)
