= Silver City Galleria =

Demolished shopping mall in Taunton, Massachusetts, U.S.

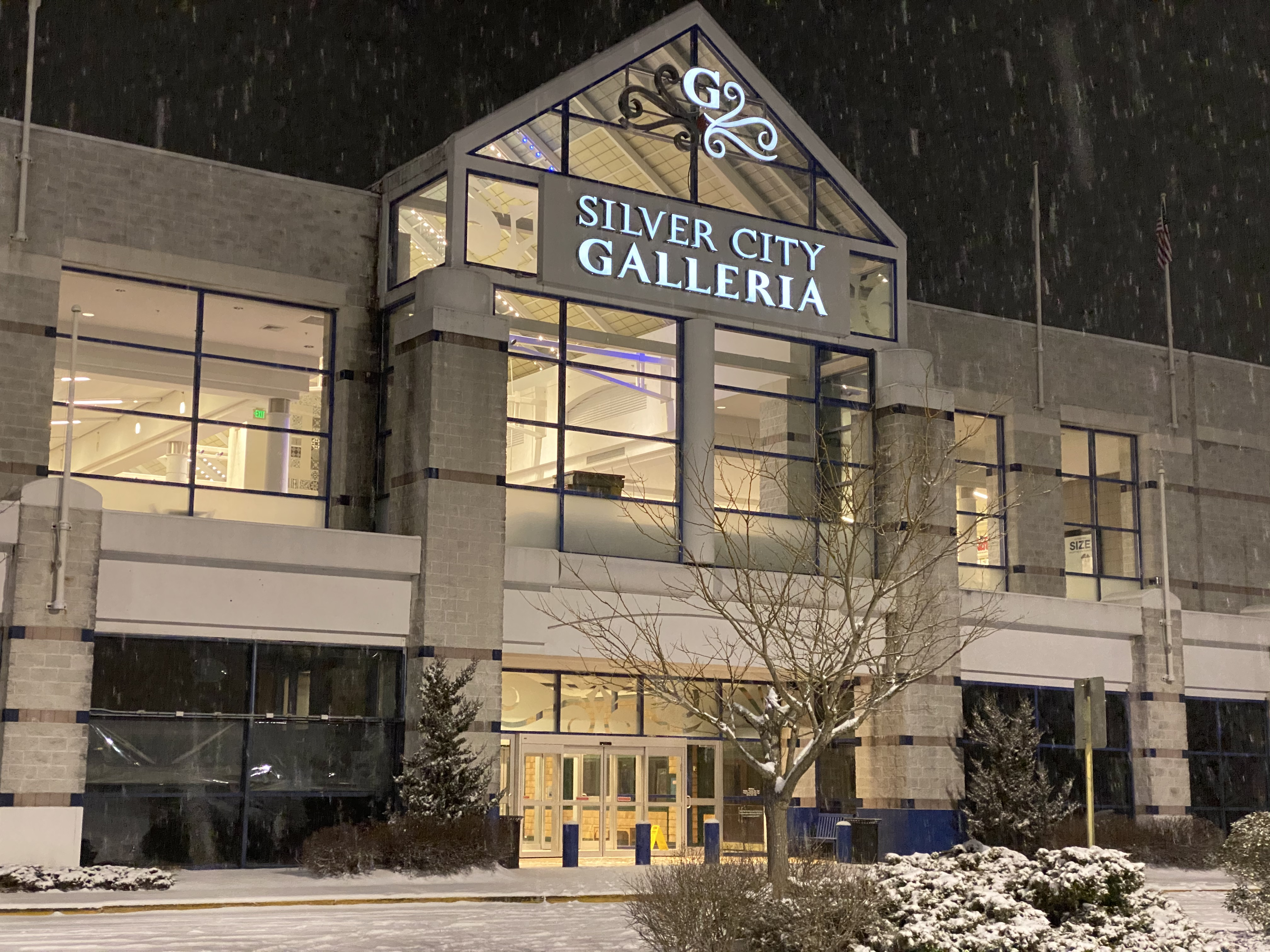
- Entrance to the food court and restaurant wing, January 2020
- Location: Taunton, Massachusetts, United States
- Coordinates: 41.864°N 71.052°W
- Address: 2 Galleria Mall Drive
- Opened: March 1, 1992
- Closed: March 1, 2020
- Developer: Pyramid Management Group
- Manager: JLL
- Owner: Thibeault Developments
- Architect: ADD
- Num. of stores: 120
- Num. of anchor tenants: 8 (all vacant)
- Floor area: 1,030,000 square feet (96,000 m^{2})
- Floors: 2, plus basement tenant (former Filene's Basement) and mezzanine food court level
- Parking: 4,900 parking spaces
- Website: silvercitygalleria.com

The Silver City Galleria was a two-level enclosed regional mall located in East Taunton, Massachusetts, near the junction of Route 24 and Route 140. It featured more than 1,000,000 square feet (93,000 m²) of leasable space and primarily served the northeastern area of the South Coast region of Massachusetts. Despite its size, the mall had a relatively short lifespan, operating for 28 years before it was demolished in 2021. As of 2026, the site is undergoing redevelopment.

At its peak in the mid 1990s, the mall featured 120 retail stores, 8 anchor tenants, 33 customer service locations, a 10-screen cinema, 6 sit-down restaurants, 6 specialty eateries, an arcade, a food court, a central court, and a children’s play area.

== History ==
Development of the Silver City Galleria began in 1989, shortly after the opening of the Emerald Square Mall in North Attleboro. The mall was designed by the firm ADD, and was planned and developed by Pyramid Management Group, during a period when several other regional malls—including Independence Mall (now Kingston Collection) and Berkshire Mall—were also under construction. Although the site was in a relatively rural area, its proximity to Routes 24 and 140, as well as I-495, was seen as offering sufficient market potential to support a regional shopping center. The targeted market area included Taunton, Raynham, Fall River, New Bedford, and Middleborough. Construction began in July 1990 and was completed in February 1992. The Silver City Galleria officially opened on March 1, 1992.

When the Silver City Galleria first opened, it was located in a largely undeveloped, forested area with little surrounding commercial or residential development. The mall was entirely dependent on automobile traffic from nearby highways for customer access. The original anchor tenants included Sears, JCPenney, Macy's, Best Buy, Dick's Sporting Goods, Regal Cinemas, Lechmere and Steve & Barry's. There were also plans to add a Jordan Marsh store between Regal Cinemas and Filene's (later Macy's), but the plan was canceled following Macy’s acquisition of Jordan Marsh. A second-floor corridor with a window at its end marks the location where the store was intended to be built. Security services were managed by IPC International, while facilities services were overseen by UGL's Unicco.

The Silver City Galleria gained attention in 1996 when Richard Simmons filmed his Farewell to Fat infomercial in the mall’s center court. In 2002, the mall was acquired through a joint venture between General Growth Properties and the Teachers' Retirement System of the State of Illinois as part of a $634 million transaction involving three other shopping centers.

=== Early decline ===
Despite relative popularity during its early years of operation, the mall began to stagnate by the late 1990s and early-2000s, limiting its potential for future growth. Following the stock market crash associated with the Great Recession in September 2008, the Silver City Galleria experienced a significant decline in both foot traffic and financial stability. By this time, several contributing factors—including the mall’s remote location, limited surrounding development, and lack of outparcels—had significantly undermined its competitiveness in the regional market. The initial strategy of relying solely on highway through-traffic had proven inadequate for sustaining long-term growth. Numerous retailers closed their stores, many of which were never replaced; by March 2010, the mall's occupancy rate had fallen to approximately 75 percent—considered low by industry standards. Notable national chains that departed during this period included Old Navy and PacSun. The mall's mortgage, serviced by Midland Loan Services, went into default in November 2009, and an attempted sale of the property fell through in September 2011. In mid-November 2011, Midland Loan Services acquired the mall, ending its ownership by General Growth Properties. The following month, in December 2011, mall management was transferred to Cushman & Wakefield Commercial Real Estate Management.

In March 2013, the Mashpee Wampanoag Tribe included the Silver City Galleria property in its Intergovernmental Agreement (IGA) with the City of Taunton, signaling an intent to incorporate the mall site into its proposed $1 billion First Light Resort & Casino development. While the casino had originally been proposed in 2012 on a separate 321-acre parcel adjacent to the mall, the tribe did not own the Galleria property and had not secured an agreement to purchase it. The inclusion of the mall site in the IGA came as a surprise to city officials, as the tribe had not previously disclosed this addition. In response, the Taunton City Council voted to amend the agreement to require the tribe to negotiate a new mitigation plan with the city if it sought to expand the casino project beyond the originally designated area. Ultimately, the Galleria remained under separate ownership and was not included in the land taken into federal trust for the casino. The casino project later encountered legal challenges and did not advance.

In July 2013, the property was sold again, this time to the MGHerring Group in partnership with Tricom Real Estate Group. In April 2014, new ownership announced plans for renovations intended to stabilize operations and reduce the risk of foreclosure. On January 8, 2015, JCPenney announced it would close its Silver City Galleria location as part of a broader plan to shutter 39 underperforming stores nationwide. The store officially closed in April 2015. In May 2015, mall officials announced that Round One would become a new anchor tenant, occupying the space formerly held by Steve & Barry’s and Lechmere. At the same time, plans were revealed to upgrade the Regal Cinemas with a restaurant, bar, recliner seating, and a redesigned entrance. Both projects were completed by December 2015.

=== 2016 attack ===
Silver City Galleria attack
- Location: Taunton, Massachusetts, U.S.
- Date: May 10, 2016 c. 7:00 p.m. (EDT)
- Attack type: Mass stabbing
- Weapon: Kitchen knife
- Deaths: 3 (including the perpetrator)
- Injuries: 5
- Perpetrator: Arthur DaRosa

On May 10, 2016, two people were stabbed at the mall shortly after another two were stabbed at a nearby residence. Two of the victims died along with the attacker, who was shot by an off-duty sheriff's deputy. The attacker had previously crashed a Honda Accord into the Macy's store at the mall. The incident occurred at about 7:00 p.m. EDT.

The attacker was identified as 28-year-old Arthur DaRosa. According to DaRosa's sister, he checked himself into a local hospital the night before the attack and was released the following morning. He was also reportedly mentally ill and had been struggling with depression for years.

The attack started when DaRosa crashed his car on Myricks Street, located near the mall. DaRosa then began to run around the area erratically, attempting to break into a number of homes. He eventually broke into a house and stabbed Patricia Slavin, 80, and her daughter Kathleen, 48, with a kitchen knife. Patricia died in the hospital while Kathleen was being treated for life-threatening injuries. DaRosa then stole a Honda vehicle from the Slavin household, crashed it into the Macy's, stabbed two more people at a Bertucci's restaurant, and assaulted three other people before being shot by an off-duty police officer. One of the stabbing victims, 56-year-old George Heath, was killed while trying to rescue the other stabbing victim—a pregnant 26-year-old waitress named Sheenah Savoy, who survived.

== Closure and demolition ==
Macy's announced on January 4, 2017, that they would be closing their Silver City location as part of a plan to close 68 stores; the store closed in April 2017. On September 15, 2017, Best Buy announced it would also be closing in October as part of a plan to close 15 stores nationwide, leaving Sears and Dick's Sporting Goods as the only remaining anchor tenants. On August 22, 2018, Sears announced they would close their Silver City location in November as part of a plan to close 46 stores nationwide, leaving Dick's Sporting Goods as the last anchor tenant.

In May 2019, the mall was foreclosed on by the Branch Banking and Trust Company due to an unpaid mortgage loan. On May 17, 2019, the Silver City Galleria was sold for $7.5 million at auction. On June 19, 2019, Thibeault Developments, the new owners of the Silver City Galleria, announced that the mall would continue to be managed by its previous ownership and management team during the transition. Thibeault indicated that redevelopment plans would be announced in the near future. On October 17, 2019, it was confirmed that Bristol Community College's Taunton Campus—which had occupied the first floor of the former Old Navy since 2016—would vacate its space in the mall in 2020. On February 4, 2020, the mall abruptly gave notices of termination to six tenants; the only remaining tenants were on the mall's west side or rear. The mall's main entrance was also closed at this time, with signs directing shoppers to the entrance near Regal Cinemas. The mall closed permanently on February 29, 2020.

Regal Cinemas shut down in 2020 as part of a temporary closure of all Regal theaters due to the COVID-19 pandemic. On December 11, 2020, it was announced Round One Entertainment would be closing in January 2021. Dick's Sporting Goods closed in early January 2021. On January 21, 2021, it was announced that Silver City Galleria would be demolished in February, with one investor saying it was too expensive to keep open. Demolition work began the following month. The Silver City Galleria was officially demolished by May 9, 2021.

== Redevelopment ==
While the mall was being decommissioned and then demolished between 2019 and 2021, Thibeault actively solicited redevelopment proposals. On June 16, 2021, Atlanta-based company Portman Industrial purchased the mall site for $75 million with the intent to construct warehousing on the 146-acre property. In March 2022 FedEx, through its consultant Kroll LLC, initiated contact with the City of Taunton to explore the feasibility of constructing a distribution center on the former mall property. In July 2022, the Taunton Planning Board unanimously approved FedEx's proposal to build a $165 million 560,000-square-foot distribution center at the Galleria site. In January 2023, FedEx withdrew from the project, citing rising construction costs and a reassessment of its expansion strategy due to declining online sales revenue. In response, Portman Industrial indicated it would proceed with alternative development plans.

In January 2024, Portman announced that it had secured $29 million in construction financing for the first phase of the Silver City Business Park. The 1.1 million-square-foot industrial park is projected for completion sometime in 2026.

== See also ==
- Swansea Mall: former enclosed mall in Swansea, converted to strip mall
- Hanover Crossing: former enclosed mall in Hanover, Massachusetts, converted to a mixed-use development, specifically a Lifestyle center
- Emerald Square: enclosed mall in North Attleborough, still operating
