= Smelt Pond =

Lake of the United States of America

- Location within Massachusetts
- Location: Kingston, Massachusetts
- Coordinates: 41°58′03″N 70°43′25″W
- Basin countries: United States
- Surface area: 44 acres (18 ha)

Smelt Pond is a 44-acre (180,000 m^{2}) pond in Kingston, Massachusetts. The pond is located west of the Kingston Collection and north of U.S. Route 44. Camp Nekon, a 193-acre (0.78 km^{2}) former Girl Scout camp which closed in 1975 and has since become a recreation area, surrounds the pond. The water quality is impaired due to non-native aquatic plants and non-native fish in the pond.
