= Ithaca station =

Ithaca station could refer to:

- Lehigh Valley Railroad Station (Ithaca, New York), a defunct train station in Ithaca, New York
- Ithaca Bus Station, a bus station in Ithaca, New York
- Ithaca Fire Station, a defunct fire station in Paddington, Queensland
