= Galleria at Crystal Run =

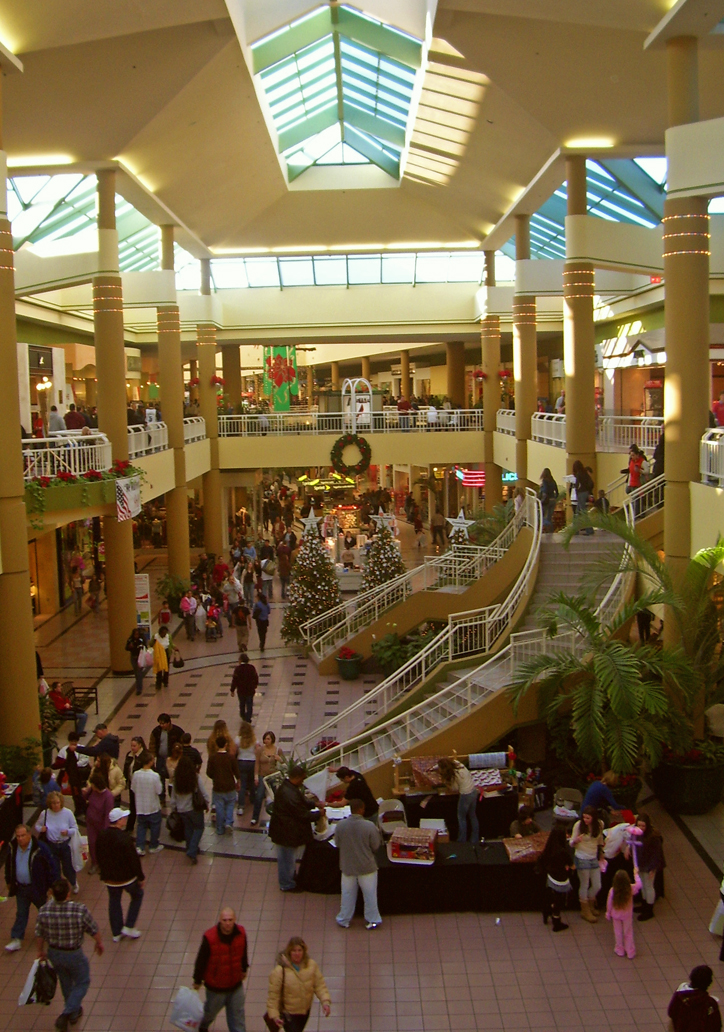
- Galleria at Crystal Run interior, 2007
- Location: Wallkill, Orange County, New York, United States
- Coordinates: 41.453052°N 74.368279°W
- Opened: April 1, 1992; 34 years ago
- Developer: The Pyramid Companies
- Owner: The Pyramid Companies
- Num. of stores: 120
- Num. of anchor tenants: 6
- Floor area: 1,100,000 sq ft (100,000 m^{2})
- Floors: 2
- Website: galleriacrystalrun.com

The Galleria at Crystal Run is a shopping center located in the Town of Wallkill, New York. It is the second-largest mall in New York's Hudson Valley region.

== History ==
The galleria, which opened in 1992, has an area of 1,100,000 square feet (99,000 m²) on two floors. It has 120 shops and restaurants, as well as a 16-screen AMC Theatres.

The Galleria is owned and managed by The Pyramid Companies, a group that also owns and manages regional sisters Poughkeepsie Galleria in Poughkeepsie (the model for Crystal Run), and Palisades Center in West Nyack.
