= Amy Kremenek =

American academic administrator

President of Tompkins Cortland Community College
- Incumbent
- Assumed office June 1, 2022
- Preceded by: Orinthia Montague

Personal details
- Children: 2
- Education: Syracuse University; University of Maryland Global Campus

Amy D. Kremenek is an American academic administrator serving as the fifth president of the Tompkins Cortland Community College.

== Life ==
Kremenek completed a B.S. from the S.I. Newhouse School of Public Communications in 1991 and a M.P.A. from the Maxwell School of Citizenship and Public Affairs in 2011. She earned a Doctor of Business Administration in community college policy and administration from the University of Maryland Global Campus in 2021. Her dissertation was titled, The Temporary President in the Community College. Trudy Bers and Gena Glickman were her doctoral advisors.

Kremenek joined the Onondaga Community College (OCC) as a public relations coordinator in October 2003. She served as its chief public affairs officer from September 2005 to June when she became the vice president for human resources and external relations from June 2011. She served as the OCC vice president of enrollment, development, and communications from July 2015 to 2022. Kremenek became the fifth president of Tompkins Cortland Community College on June 1, 2022, succeeding Orinthia Montague.

Kremenek is married and has two children.
