= Pyramid Management Group =

American real estate development company

- Type: Private
- Industry: Real estate development
- Founded: 1968
- Founder: Robert J. Congel
- Headquarters: Syracuse, New York
- Number of locations: 9 malls (2024)
- Area served: New York State, Massachusetts
- Key people: Stephen J. Congel, CEO Timothy J. Kelley, President
- Products: Shopping malls
- Services: Management and development
- Website: pyramidmg.com

Pyramid Management Group (also known as The Pyramid Companies) is an American real estate development company founded in 1968 by Robert J. Congel. It is the largest privately held shopping mall development firm in the Northeastern United States, with a large concentration on New York State. The company's flagship mall is Destiny USA in Syracuse, New York.

== History ==
=== Early Years (1960s and 1970s) ===
The Pyramid Companies (Pyramid) was founded as a small construction company in 1968 in Syracuse, New York by Robert J. Congel in partnership with Michael J. Falcone and Joseph T. Scuderi. The company grew slowly at first, with their first break coming when they won a $13,000 contract to lay sewer pipe. Hoping to become involved in more lucrative ventures, Congel contacted Simon Property Group, an Indianapolis, Indiana developer. The Simons gave Congel a two-day seminar on the principles of the shopping center development, teaching him design, building, and financing.

In a couple years, Pyramid had begun developing shopping centers in Upstate New York. Their first three were Pyramid Mall Johnstown in Johnstown, New York, Pyramid Mall Fulton in Fulton, New York, and Pyramid Mall Oneonta in Oneonta, New York. All three malls opened in 1972. Each mall featured a White-Modell's department store and Loblaws supermarket as anchors. These malls were much smaller, community-type centers compared to the company's later projects.

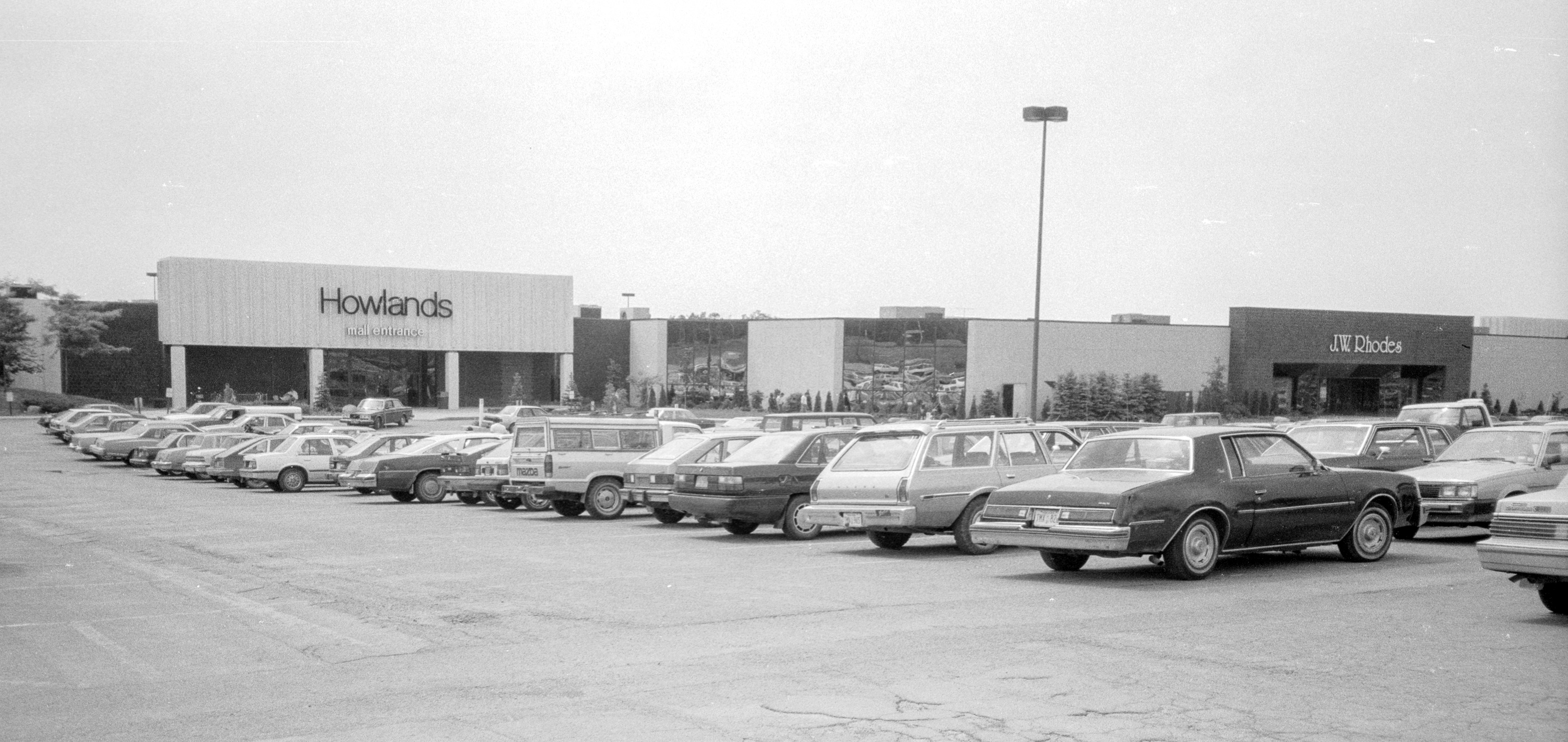
The Shops at Ithaca Mall (Pyramid Mall at the time) in 1987

Pyramid's next shopping centers, regarded as their "pioneer malls", were Pyramid Mall Ithaca (later The Shops at Ithaca Mall) in Lansing, New York, Pyramid Mall Plattsburgh (later Champlain Centre South) in Plattsburgh, New York, and Pyramid Mall Saratoga (later Saratoga Mall) in Saratoga Springs, New York. All three malls opened in 1975 and marked the beginning of widespread changes in shopping center construction and ownership. Of these three malls, the Plattsburgh and Saratoga properties were demolished for strip centers, but the Ithaca property is still in operation as of September 2020.

Following these initial successes, Pyramid began a rapid expansion. By 1976 they had completed 22 shopping centers, several office buildings and project for Syracuse University. The founding partners split in 1978 to pursue their individual passions. Congel wanted to concentrate on shopping mall development, whereas Falcone and Scuderi were more interested in the office market.

=== 1980s ===
Over the next decade, Congel and Pyramid built a dozen malls in New York and Massachusetts, during which time Congel and his team honed their development and management methods. When planning new projects, they targeted markets where a new regional shopping mall might thrive, either through unmet demand or, when markets had become saturated, by targeting competing malls. They then identified parcels of inexpensive land in close proximity to interstates or major arterial roads. This practice occasionally resulted in the selection of environmentally sensitive land or brownfields, which were purchased by Pyramid using affiliated subsidiaries. Once selected, Pyramid could usually complete its projects in half the time of other developers, needing only six to nine months from groundbreaking to completion. To achieve this, the firm often skirted the edge of acceptable business practices. For example, during construction of the Berkshire Mall, Pyramid and a contractor paid more than $240,000 in fines for filling in a wetland, relocating a stream, and laying drinking water and sewage pipes in the same trench. According to a 1998 Business West article:

Pyramid brings to the table a sophisticated knowledge of land-use and zoning laws and a mastery of local political processes to achieve its ends. A common tactic is to employ litigation as a means of forcing cities and towns, where tax assessment offices are often undermanned and poorly equipped, to lower tax obligations on Pyramid properties.

These methods triggered controversy and lawsuits, and Pyramid became known for their conflicts with small business owners, residents, and environmentalists. A notable example of the latter is Pyramid's plan for construction of Crossgates Mall in a suburb just outside Albany, New York. Under subsidiaries, the company purchased parcels in the Pine Bush, one of the largest of the world's 20 remaining inland pine barrens. When revealed in 1978, residents and local environmentalists sued the company under the New York State Environmental Quality Review Act, intending to halt construction. While the mall was completed and opened in 1984, the environmentalists won a number of legal battles, establishing environmental case law. The battle resulted in the formation of environmental group Save the Pine Bush, which remains in active legal conflict over Pyramid-controlled properties in the Pine Bush nearly four decades later.

According to a 1988 Boston Globe profile, the Pyramid Companies established

a reputation not only as the biggest and fastest-growing builder of shopping malls around, but also as a corporate operator--aggressive, prolific and proud of it. One company executive referred to Pyramid's squadrons of young executives as "the Green Berets of mall-building."

=== 1990s ===
In 1998, Congel made an attempt to sell his shopping center empire to General Growth Properties for $4 billion. His eldest son held up the deal, resulting in disgruntled Pyramid partners, who ultimately sued and then settled for an undisclosed sum. However, Chase Manhattan Bank, which had obtained the right to broker the sale, had extended a $200 million dollar line of credit to Congel, of which Congel had used $113 million to finance the completion of Palisades Center in West Nyack, New York. Memos filed as evidence in the partners' lawsuit revealed that executives at Chase believed that Congel never intended to sell Pyramid's mall portfolio, and was merely using it as pretense to borrow money to shore up his company's finances, including the shortfall in the Palisades Center project, which had been budgeted at $323 million but wound up costing $595 million.

== Strategy ==
Pyramid has generally targeted potentially undervalued land already zoned for commercial use, which they then purchase their own financing. After adequate parcels have been acquired, they announce their development project and begin the process of obtaining municipal approvals. A notable exception to this strategy is Destiny USA, which the company promoted as a boon to the Syracuse, New York region and Upstate New York.

Whereas Pyramid will often maintain ownership and management of their projects for many years following construction, they often sell off their properties. When they do so they often use the "financial tear parts" strategy, such as was done at Pyramid Mall Saratoga in the Saratoga Springs, New York suburb of Wilton during the late 1980s. The theory of the strategy is that optimum profit from a development can be achieved by deconstructing the ownership into financial "tear parts", the aggregate sale price of which would exceed the sale price for entire unit. In the case of Pyramid Mall Saratoga, Pyramid sold the land, structure, and management contracts each to separate investors.

== Operations ==
As of September 2024, Pyramid is the largest privately owned shopping mall developer in the northeastern United States, owning 9 properties in total: 8 in New York and one in Massachusetts. In 2021, Pyramid owned four of the 20 most visited shopping centers in America: Destiny USA in Syracuse, New York, Walden Galleria in Buffalo, New York, and Crossgates Mall in Albany, New York.

== List of properties ==
=== Malls ===
- Crossgates Mall - Albany, New York - Opened 1984
- Destiny USA (formerly Carousel Center) - Syracuse, New York - Opened 1990
- Galleria at Crystal Run - Middletown, New York - Opened 1992
- Holyoke Mall at Ingleside - Holyoke, Massachusetts - Opened 1979
- Poughkeepsie Galleria - Poughkeepsie, New York - Opened 1987
- Salmon Run Mall - Watertown, New York - Opened 1986
- Sangertown Square - New Hartford, New York - Opened 1980
- Walden Galleria - Buffalo, New York - Opened 1989

=== Retail parks ===
- Crossgates Commons - Albany, New York - Opened 1994 - adjacent to Crossgates Mall

== Past properties ==
The following is a list of malls and power centers that were either closed by Pyramid, or sold to another company.

=== New York ===
- Aviation Mall - Queensbury, New York - Opened 1975. Foreclosed in 2024 and sold at auction in 2025 for $21 million to Concord Capital New York
- Shops at West Seneca - West Seneca, New York - Opened in 1998 on the site of former Seneca Mall
- The Shops at Ithaca Mall - Lansing, New York - Opened 1976 as Pyramid Mall Ithaca. Renamed in 2007. Acquired by Namdar Realty Group in 2017.
- Pyramid Mall Plattsburgh - Plattsburgh, New York - Opened 1975, later named Champlain Centre South. Closed 1999. Demolished 1999 and revamped into a big box center with Lowe's, Price Chopper, and retaining the original Kmart store. Sold to Champlain Center South Associates in 2001.
- Champlain Centre - Plattsburgh, New York - Opened 1987, foreclosed on in 2023. Now owned by Deutsche Bank.
- Pyramid Mall Saratoga - Wilton, New York - Opened 1975, later named Saratoga Mall after being sold. Closed in 1997 and demolished in 1999.
- Finger Lakes Mall - Auburn, New York - Opened 1980, Sold to Jager Management in 1999.
- Hudson Valley Mall - Kingston, New York - Opened 1981, sold to CBL & Associates Properties. Mall is now owned by Hull Property Group.
- Palisades Center - West Nyack, New York - Opened 1998, foreclosed on in 2024. Now managed by Spinoso Real Estate Group.
- Riverside Mall - Utica, New York - Opened 1974, converted to a strip mall in 1998, sold to Nightingale Properties in 2011.
- Pyramid Mall Geneva - Geneva, New York - Redeveloped by Centro Properties Group.
- Pyramid Mall Johnstown - Johnstown, New York - Opened 1972.
- Pyramid Mall Fulton - Fulton, New York - Opened 1972 - sold and converted into a strip mall.
- Pyramid Mall Oneonta - Oneonta, New York - Opened 1972 - sold to Bettiol Enterprises in 1994, converted to an outpatient center for A.O. Fox Memorial Hospital in 1997.

=== Massachusetts ===
- Berkshire Mall - Lanesborough, Massachusetts, a suburb of Pittsfield, Massachusetts - Opened 1988, Sold in 2014 to CBL & Associates Properties.
- Emerald Square - North Attleborough, Massachusetts - Opened 1989 in conjunction with New England Development, later sold interest in 1998.
- Hampshire Mall - Hadley, Massachusetts - Opened 1978, foreclosed and sold at auction in June 2024.
- Kingston Collection - Kingston, Massachusetts - Opened 1989, sold to Second Horizon Capital.
- Silver City Galleria - Taunton, Massachusetts - Opened 1992, sold to GGP.

== Bibliography ==
- Kunstler, James Howard (1993). The Geography of Nowhere: The Rise and Decline of America's Man-Made Landscape. New York City, New York: Simon & Schuster, Inc. ISBN 0-671-70774-4.
