= Bernie Milton =

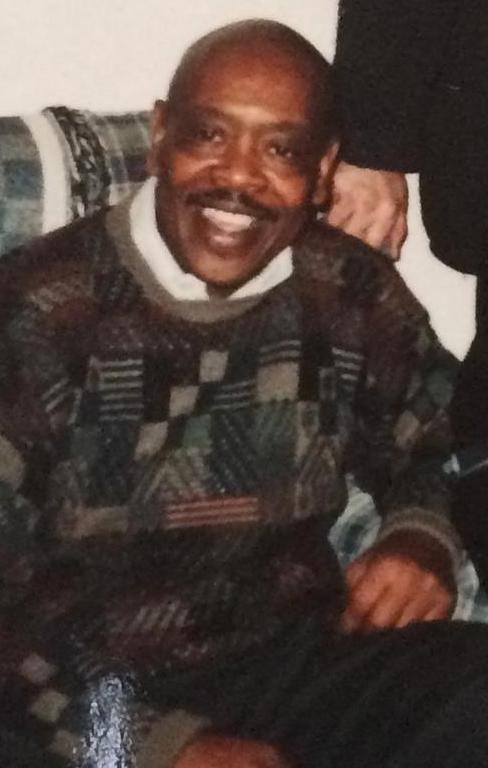

Background information
- Birth name: Bernard Lawrence Milton
- Born: January 30, 1942; Ithaca, New York, U.S.
- Died: May 19, 2002 (aged 60); Ithaca, New York, U.S.
- Genres: Soul, R&B, Pop
- Instrument: Vocalist
- Years active: 1955–2002
- Labels: Josie, Jove, ASCOT, Chaton Records, Sphynx
- Formerly of: The Silvertones, Bernie & the Blazers, Little Bernie & the Cavaliers, Bernie Milton & the Soul Patrol, The Bernie Milton Band, The Bernie Milton Experience

Bernard Lawrence Milton (January 30, 1942 – May 19, 2002) better known as "Bernie", was a soul and rhythm & blues singer from Ithaca, New York. He was a regional musician who performed in a variety of acts throughout Central New York from the 1950s through the early 2000s.

== Early life ==
Bernie was born in Ithaca, New York on January 30, 1942, the second of Curtis and Agnes (Johnson) Milton's three sons. His mother Agnes was a classically trained pianist and attended the Ithaca Conservatory of Music, which later became Ithaca College.

== Performing ==
From a young age, Bernie performed alongside his mother at church. At the age of eleven, he performed in a talent contest at the Apollo Theater in Harlem, singing one of Elvis Presley's hits, "I Got a Woman". Throughout the 1950s, Milton performed throughout the Ithaca-area as a frequent act for fraternity and alumni festivities at Cornell University, local community centers, clubs and concert halls. He was often in lineups alongside Bobby Comstock, another hometown musician. He signed his first record deal in 1960 and achieved more regional popularity with his single "The Waddle" in 1962. His other signature single "60/40" was penned in 1985.

== Radio ==
In 1983, Milton became an on-air radio disc jockey at Ithaca College's radio station, local 91.7 WICB, hosting a Friday morning show called "Looking Back", playing soul, rhythm & blues and Motown music. Shortly after Bernie's passing in 2002, his nephew, Ricky Milton assumed the host role and remains in the position currently.

== Legacy ==
In 2003, the main pavilion on The Commons in downtown Ithaca was named the Bernie Milton pavilion in his honor. It has been the site for live music performances dating back to the 1970s, including Milton's own bands throughout his career. In 2015, the City of Ithaca completed a renovation of the Commons which included the construction of new pavilion at its northern entrance at the intersection of Seneca and Tioga Streets. The pavilion was dedicated in honor of Bernie's musical legacy in the weeks following the Commons re-opening celebration with ceremony including friends, former bandmates and family members performing some of his old hits.

== Personal life ==
Milton had eight children and at the time of his passing was married to his wife of 25 years, the late Renee (Steele) Milton. Milton died suddenly of a heart attack on May 19, 2002, in his hometown of Ithaca, New York.
