= Saratoga Mall =

Shopping mall in Wilton, New York

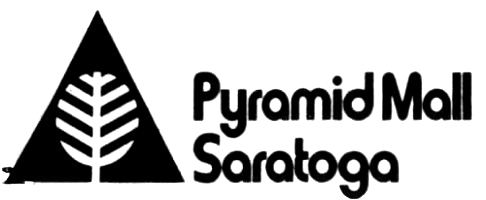
- Location: Wilton, New York, United States
- Coordinates: 43.10°N 73.74°W
- Opened: October 18, 1973
- Closed: 1999
- Developer: The Pyramid Companies
- Owner: Starwood Ceruzzi Properties, Inc.
- Num. of anchor tenants: 3
- Floor area: 450,000 sq ft (42,000 m^{2})
- Floors: 1

Saratoga Mall was an enclosed, automobile-oriented shopping mall in Wilton, New York near the city of Saratoga Springs, New York. It was demolished in 1999. It was previously known as Pyramid Mall Saratoga and was located on Route 50 just off Exit 15 on I-87 Adirondack Northway). After demolition, it was replaced by a big box strip center known as Wilton Square.

== Development ==
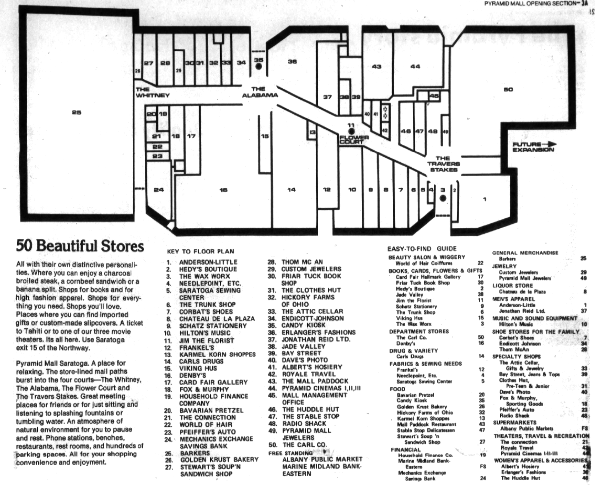
Saratoga Mall grand opening directory from October 16, 1973

Originally called Pyramid Mall Saratoga, the mall was built by The Pyramid Companies. Construction began in late 1972/early 1973. It was the first regional mall developed by the company.

The mall was on 45 acres (180,000 m^{2}) of land. Landscaping included 3,000 ft (910 m) of grass sod, 20 acres (81,000 m^{2}) of land seeded for grass, and over 172 trees.

== Opening ==
The mall opened for business on October 18, 1973, with fifty stores and no vacancies. The original size of the mall was 310,000 square feet (29,000 m^{2}). It employed more than 450 people.

For opening day, Miss New York State, Susan Carlson, was set to cut the ribbon. There was a drawing for a free flight for two to Nassau in the Bahamas. Mostly due to the new shopping mall, Wilton town supervisor Robert Gavin announced a property tax reduction of 54 percent one month after the mall's opening. There were four major courts in the mall that had fountains, skylights, bridges, and pools.

In early 1976, Montgomery Ward opened, bringing the total size of the mall to 435,800 square feet (40,490 m^{2}). The addition included 113,502 square feet (10,544.7 m^{2}). The Montgomery Ward store addition totaled 95,500 square feet (8,870 m^{2}).

The mall's name changed in 1987 when it came under new ownership. Owners of the Saratoga Mall in 1989 proposed a small strip mall called Wilton Square (the eventual name of the successor to the mall after demolition) of 29,000 square feet (2,700 m^{2}) with 135 parking spaces. The number of parking spaces was not enough for Wilton town code. An exception was not made as it was for the Wilton Mall at Saratoga being developed next door to the Saratoga Mall.

In mid-1992, the movie theaters at Saratoga Mall were managed by Hoyts. Hoyts also had newer theaters in the Wilton Mall next door. On June 19, 1992, the Saratoga Mall theaters became a second-run theater with ticket prices at $1.99. At that point, the mall had six theaters. The final showings at the mall took place on Thursday, August 26, 1999. At the time, there were eight employees working for that cinema.

== Ownership ==
The mall was originally owned and developed by The Pyramid Companies. The mall again changed ownership in 1987, changing its name from Pyramid Mall Saratoga to Saratoga Mall in the process. In 1991, it was owned by Pyramid Centers of Empire State Co. In 1999, it was sold by Pyramid Centers of Canada to Starwood Ceruzzi Properties, Inc., of Fairfield, Connecticut. This company completed demolished the enclosed mall and built Wilton Square in its place. Starwood Ceruzzi Properties then sold the property in summer 2005 to Inland Western Saratoga Springs Wilton, LLC for almost four times what they paid.

== Demolition ==
The possibility of demolition was announced in late 1998. Mall management began talking to big box retailers such as Target about location on the site. At the time, it was mentioned that this would offer flexibility in case the owners wanted to sell the mall. The mall was 450,000 square feet (42,000 m^{2}) at that point and did not have any major anchors. Former anchors included Montgomery Ward, Jamesway, and Service Merchandise. At the time, the mall was owned by Pyramid Center & Co. Ltd.

The Price Chopper portion of the property was subdivided from the rest of the mall in 1998.

Demolition of the mall was completed in late 1999.
