= SouthCoast Marketplace =

Shopping mall in Fall River, Massachusetts, U.S.

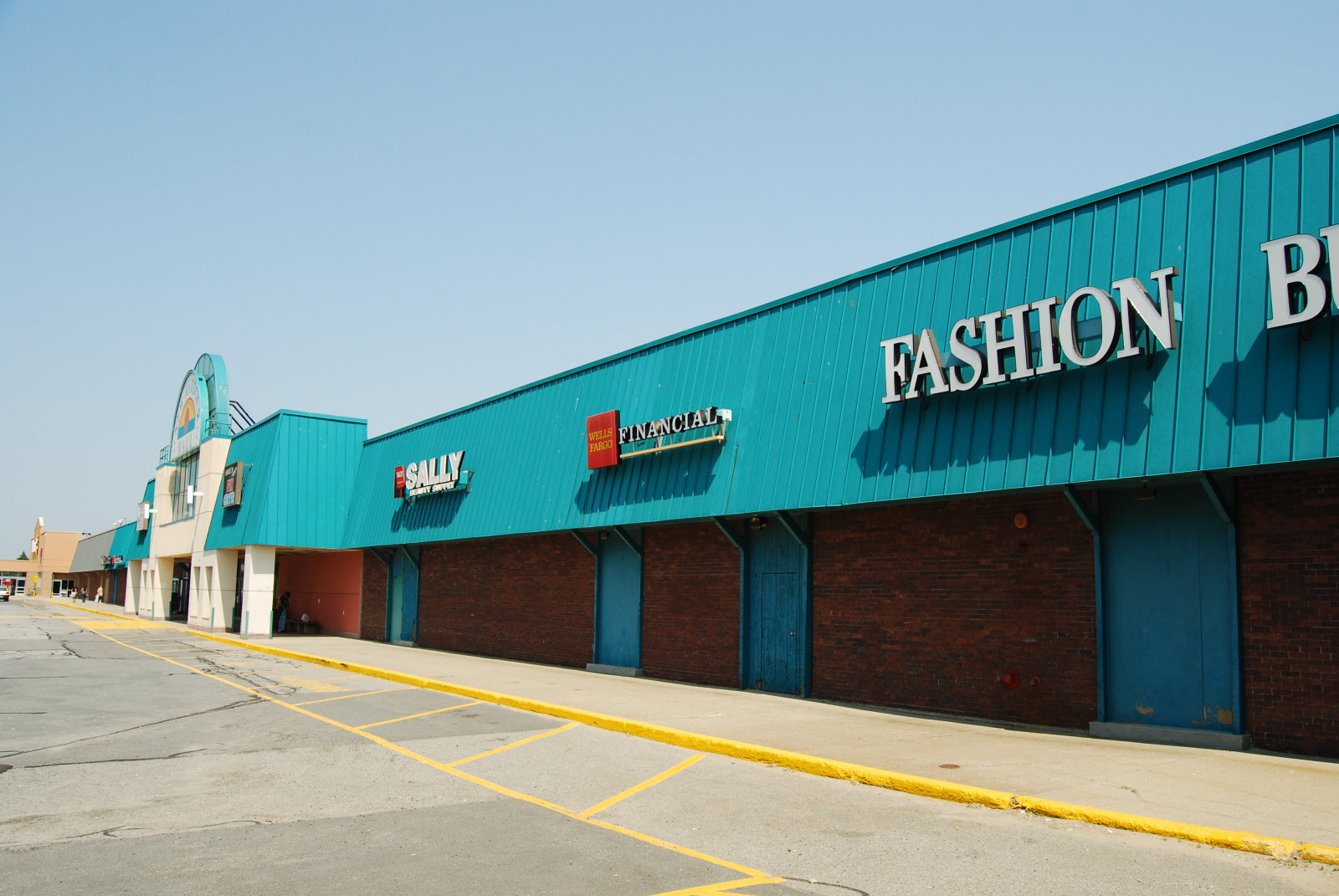
- New Harbour Mall in 2010.
- Location: Fall River, Massachusetts, United States
- Coordinates: 41.6722°N 71.1575°W
- Opened: 1971 (New Harbour Mall); October 7, 2017 (SouthCoast Marketplace)
- Closed: January 2, 2016 (New Harbour Mall)
- Owner: CEA Group
- Num. of stores: 26
- Floor area: 377,000 sq ft (35,000 m^{2})
- Floors: 1
- Website: southcoastmarketplace.com

SouthCoast Marketplace is a power center in Fall River, Massachusetts, United States, at the intersection of Route 24 and Route 81. The center opened in 2017 and replaced the New Harbour Mall, an enclosed shopping mall that was located at the site from 1971 to 2016.

New Harbour Mall was noted for having once been the only shopping center in the United States to feature rival department store chains Kmart and Walmart as its anchor stores until 2013. The mall closed its doors on Jan 2, 2016 to undergo a $50 million renovation by the CEA Group, and was demolished and replaced by SouthCoast Marketplace.

== History ==
Harbour Mall opened in 1971 with discounters Bradlees and Grant City (the discount division of W.T. Grant) as its anchor stores, the latter of which was converted to Kmart following the 1976 closure of the Grant City chain. Except for the addition of a movie theater in 1984, Harbour Mall remained largely unchanged until a 1993 renovation which added skylights, new entrance canopies, and re-designing of the common mall areas.

The mall's movie theaters closed in September 2007.

In its final years, the New Harbour Mall was largely empty except for its anchor stores. In 2015, a reporter for the Fall River's Herald News described the mall's interior as "Dark, depressing and almost eerie, with most of its store spaces shuttered and empty." Among the few interior stores left in the mall at that time were Payless ShoeSource and Rainbow, with other previous tenants such as GNC and RadioShack having already closed their locations in the mall after Walmart relocated to a new, larger store elsewhere in Fall River in 2013. The interior of the mall was closed on January 2, 2016. Kmart, the last remaining anchor tenant, closed its store in the mall in May 2016.

Following its conversion from the New Harbour Mall to SouthCoast Marketplace, the property is now a power center with no indoor mall sections. The anchor tenants of the plaza, according to the official website, are Market Basket, T.J. Maxx, and Picture Show Theaters, all of which opened in October 2017.
