= Cayuga Medical Center =

- Cayuga Health System

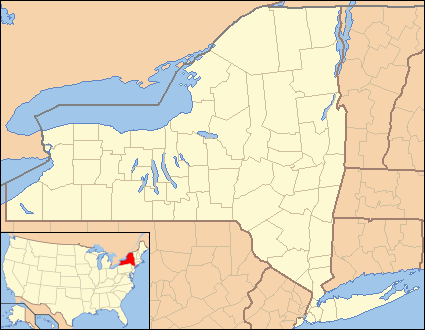
- Cayuga Medical Center shown in New York State

Geography
- Location: 101 Dates Drive, Ithaca, Tompkins County, New York, United States
- Coordinates: 42.469273°N 76.53727°W

Organization
- Care system: Medicare, Medicaid, and Public
- Type: General and teaching
- Affiliated university: Roswell Park Comprehensive Cancer Center; Weill Cornell Medicine, Cornell University; NewYork–Presbyterian Hospital; Sands-Constellation Heart Institute, Cleveland Clinic heart surgery center; Mayo Medical Laboratories; University of Rochester Medical Center; Syracuse University; Upstate University Hospital; Ithaca College; School of Nursing, Tompkins Cortland Community College

Services
- Emergency department: Yes
- Beds: 204

History
- Founded: As Tompkins County Hospital; 1980 as Cayuga Medical Center at Ithaca

Links
- Website: cayugamed.org
- Lists: Hospitals in New York State

Cayuga Medical Center, officially referred to as Cayuga Medical Center at Ithaca and abbreviated as CMC, is a not-for-profit general hospital in Ithaca, New York, serving the residents of Broome, Cayuga, Chemung, Cortland, Schuyler, Seneca, Tioga, and Tompkins counties. The hospital has 204 beds in total, and is one of the largest hospitals in the Finger Lakes region and the Southern Tier.

In 2014, the hospital announced its partnership with Schuyler Hospital, another not-for-profit general hospital in nearby Montour Falls, New York and the creation of an umbrella organization for the two hospitals, the Cayuga Health System.

In January 2025, Cayuga Health joined with Arnot Health to operate together as Centralus Health, a private health company.

== History ==
The hospital was originally known as the Tompkins County Hospital, and located on East Hill in the city of Ithaca. In the early 1970s, the hospital moved to a large new facility on West Hill outside of Ithaca. In early 1996 it changed its name to the Cayuga Medical Center.

In January 2026 a supermajority of hospital nursing staff voted to unionize with the Communication Workers of America, gaining 82% of the vote in favor of union representation and adopting the local organization name Cayuga United CWA.
