= The Shops at Ithaca Mall =

- Location: Lansing, New York, U.S.
- Coordinates: 42°29′00″N 76°29′30″W
- Address: 40 Catherwood Road
- Opened: 1976
- Developer: The Pyramid Companies
- Manager: Mason Asset Management
- Owner: Namdar Realty Group
- Num. of stores: 37
- Num. of anchor tenants: 5
- Floor area: 622,920 square feet
- Floors: 1
- Parking: Parking lot
- Website: The Shops at Ithaca Mall

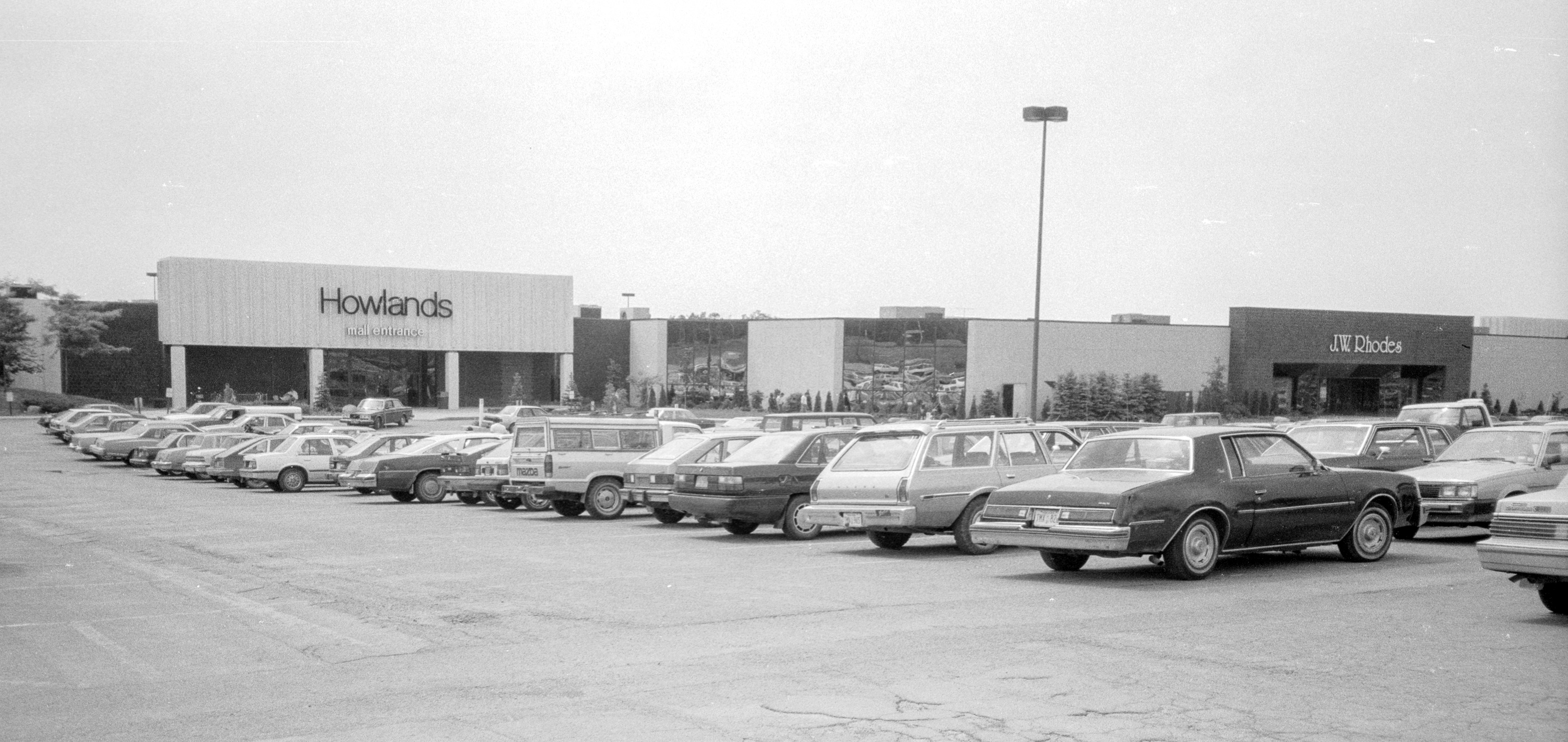
Howlands and J.W. Rhodes in Pyramid Mall in 1987

The Shops at Ithaca Mall, formerly known as the Pyramid Mall Ithaca, is a shopping center located in Lansing, New York, just north of the city of Ithaca. The mall is situated in the junction between NYS Route 13 and North Triphammer Road. With a range of national chain stores and a food court, The Shops at Ithaca Mall caters to the Tompkins County and Cortland County region. The mall's current anchor stores are Target, Regal Cinemas, 2 Cayuga Health centers, Michaels, and Best Buy.

== History ==
The mall was developed by The Pyramid Companies and opened in 1976. There was widespread community opposition to its development. Originally called Pyramid Mall Ithaca, the mall was renamed The Shops at Ithaca Mall in 2007 under new management. The mall has undergone significant changes since its opening, with all four original anchor stores (JW Rhodes, JCPenney, Montgomery Ward, and Hills, later Ames) replaced. When the mall expanded in 1989 a Sears Department Store opened there, replacing the Sears catalog store that had been in the Triphammer Mall. In 2002, JCPenney closed and became Best Buy, Borders Books & Music, and Dick's Sporting Goods. At the time of the relocation of the Regal Cinemas from its original site adjacent to Cafe Square in 2007, the mall was renamed from Pyramid Mall Ithaca. When Borders went out of business in 2011, the store became Ultimate Athletics. It has since become a Ulta Beauty and DSW (both have since been closed).

The original Hills/Ames space became Regal Cinemas in 2007. The Sears Department Store closed in 2014 and was replaced by Cayuga Health.

For several years, there was also an SPCA of Tompkins County storefront (the SPCA "Annex") for animal adoption, which included a "Kid's Corner" with picture books, stuffed animals, and adoptable cats and kittens. It also hosted pre-school story hours and children's crafts events free to the public.

A BJ's Wholesale Club opened next to the mall in January 2012.

On September 25, 2014, it was announced that Sears would close.

On April 18, 2018, it was announced that Bon-Ton would close as part of a plan to close all locations nationwide, which left Target as the only traditional anchor left.

On March 15, 2022, it was announced that Cayuga Health had purchased the former JW Rhodes/Bon-Ton and Sears buildings and converted them into health centers.

On October 19, 2022, it was announced that Dick's would be relocating to the former Tops Friendly Market in the city of Ithaca.

On January 19, 2023, it was announced that Regal Cinemas would close as part of a plan to close 39 theaters nationwide on February 15, 2023, but the theater has since stayed open past that date.

On June 12, 2024, it was announced that a Cube Smart self-storage facility would be taking over the Best Buy and the former Dick's Sporting Goods, Ulta, and DSW spaces.

== Events ==
The Shops at Ithaca Mall hosts a variety of events throughout the year. Past events included a spinoff of the American Idol Contest, bridal show, two weddings with Cayuga Radio Group, health and wellness fair, and a pet day. Members of the local community also hold fundraising events for non-profit organizations such as Habitat for Humanity.
