= Tompkins Cortland Community College =

Public college in Dryden, New York, US

- Type: Public community college
- Established: 1968; 58 years ago
- Parent institution: State University of New York
- President: Amy Kremenek
- Undergraduates: 4,898 (fall 2025)
- Location: Dryden, New York, United States; 42.50368°N 76.290801°W
- Campus: Rural 266 acres (1.08 km^{2})
- Colors: White and hunter green
- Nickname: Panthers
- Sporting affiliations: National Junior College Athletic Association, Region III, Mid-State Athletic Conference
- Website: www.tompkinscortland.edu

Tompkins Cortland Community College (TC3) is a public community college in Dryden, New York. It is supported by Cortland and Tompkins Counties and has extension sites that are located in Ithaca and Cortland. It is part of the State University of New York system.

== History ==
The college was founded in 1967 and opened in 1968 in Groton, New York. The college moved to its current Dryden, New York campus in 1974. A multimillion-dollar construction project completed in 2007 added a new athletics facility, a student center, and expanded and enhanced the college's library.

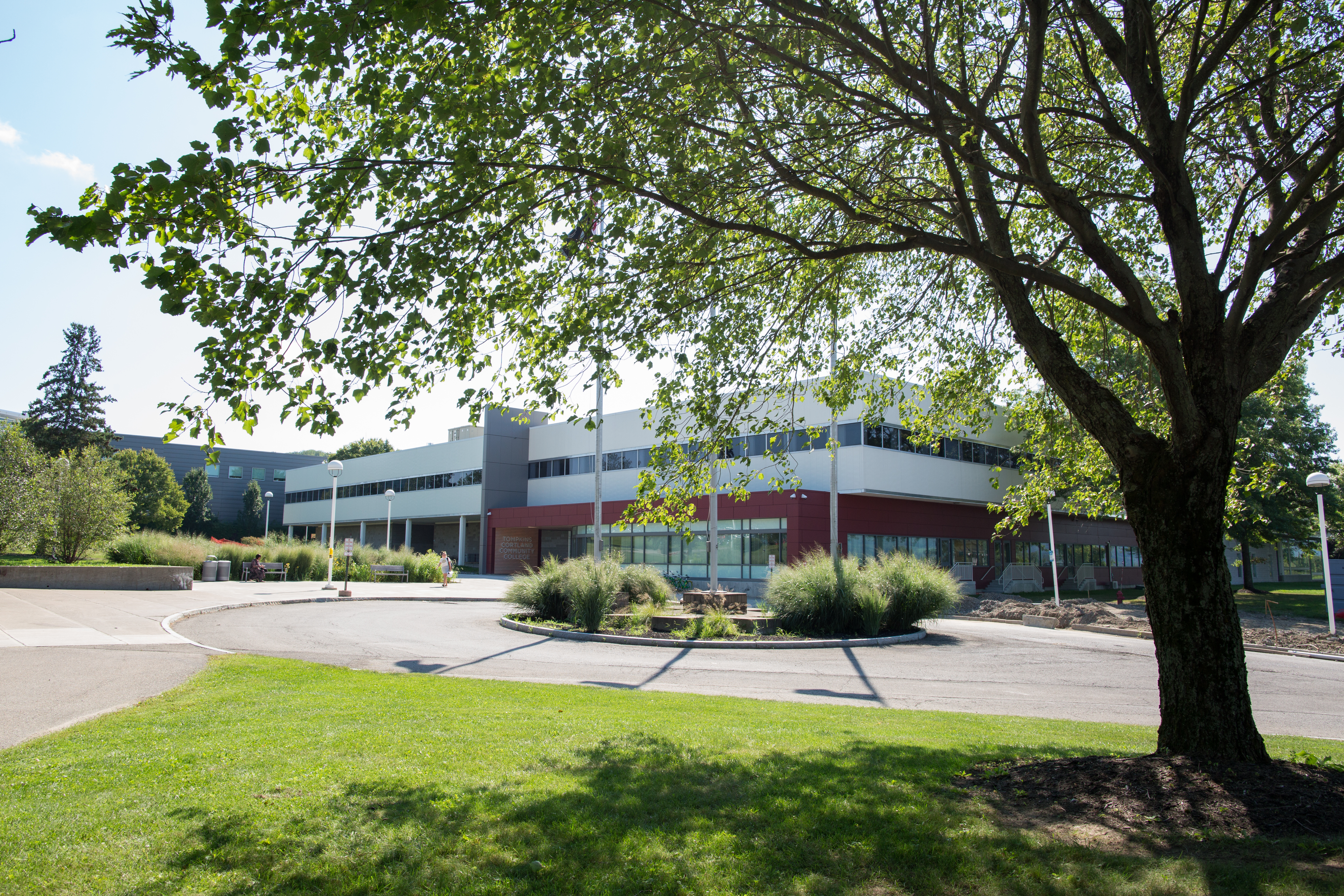
Main Academic Building

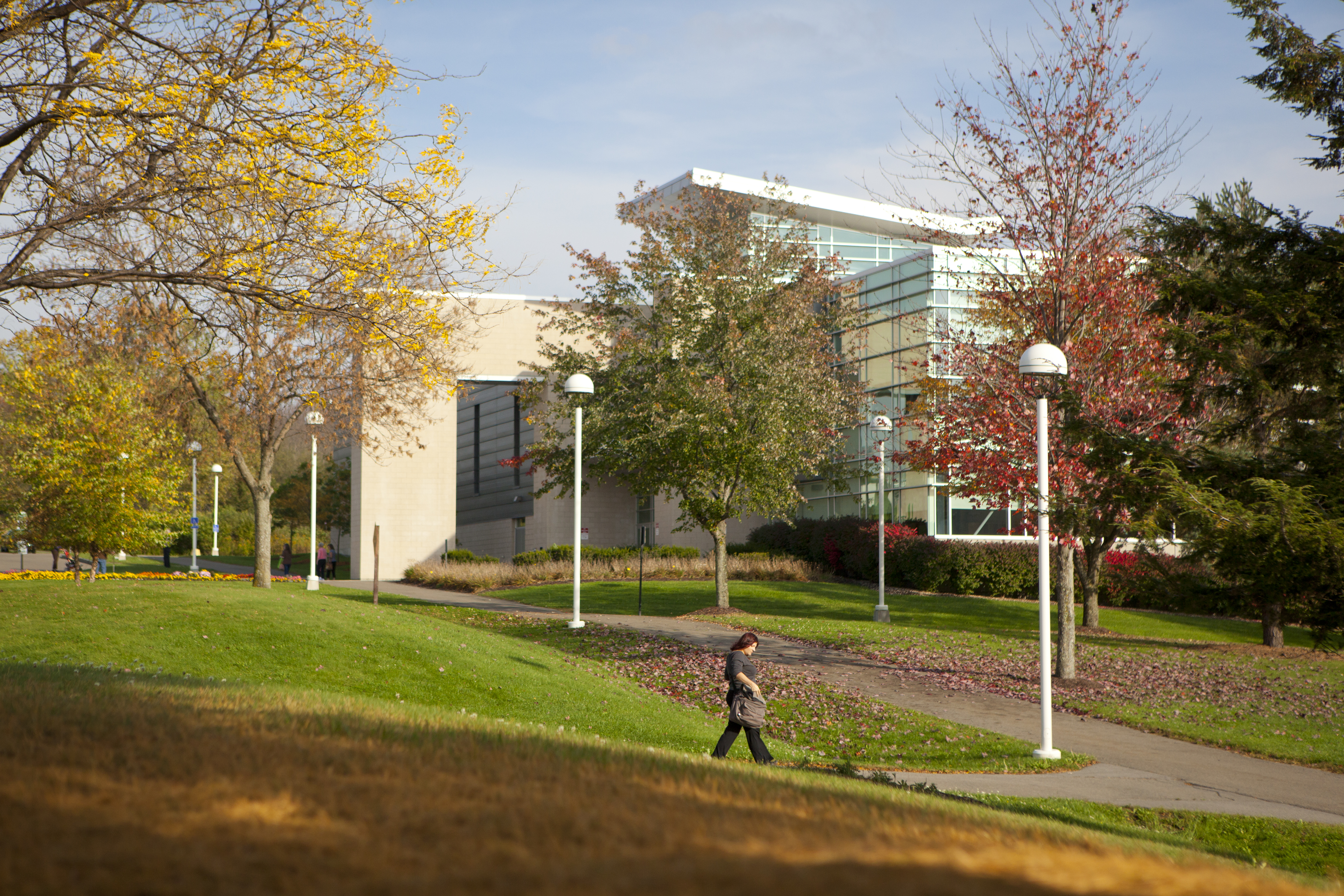
Athletic Building

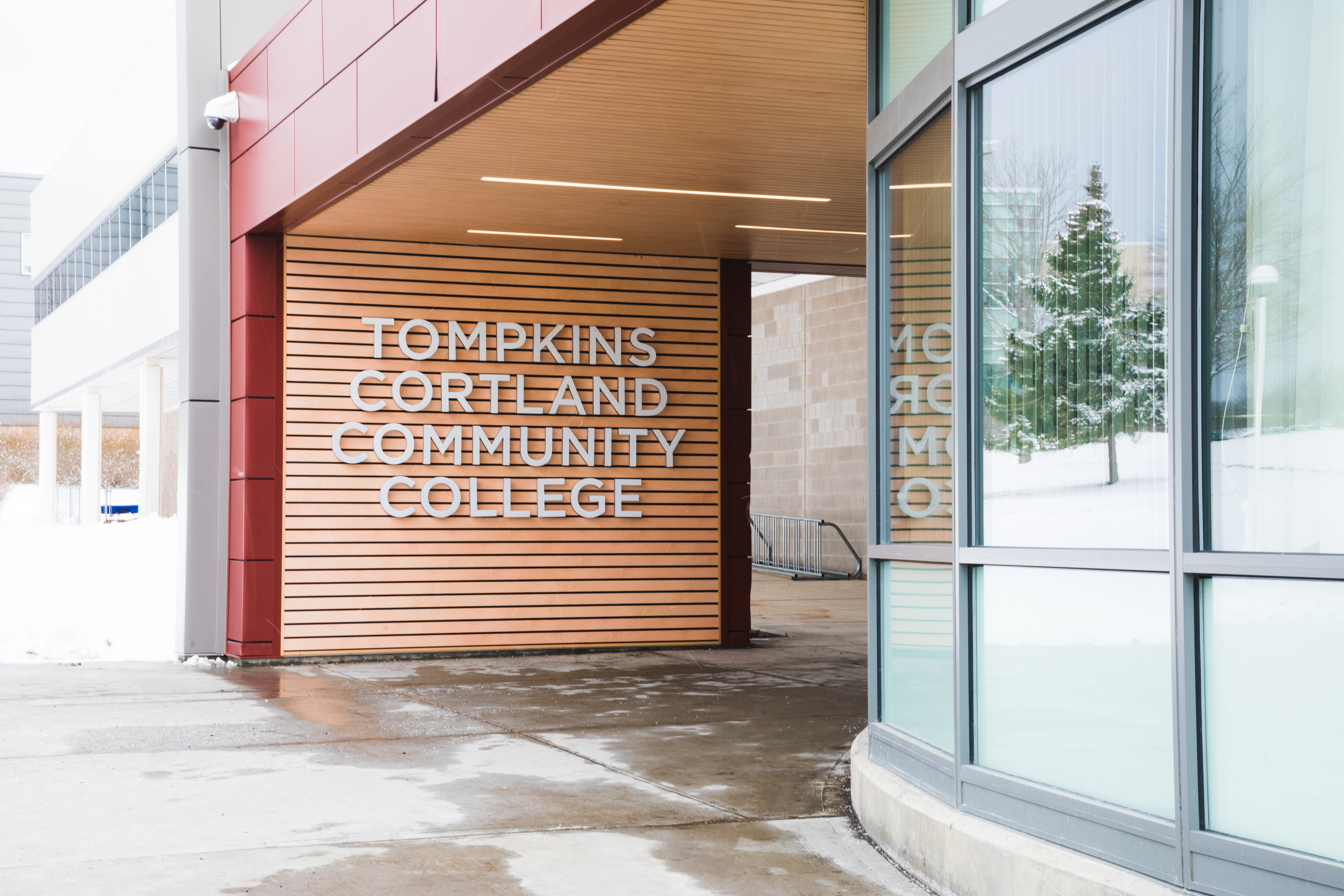
Main Entrance

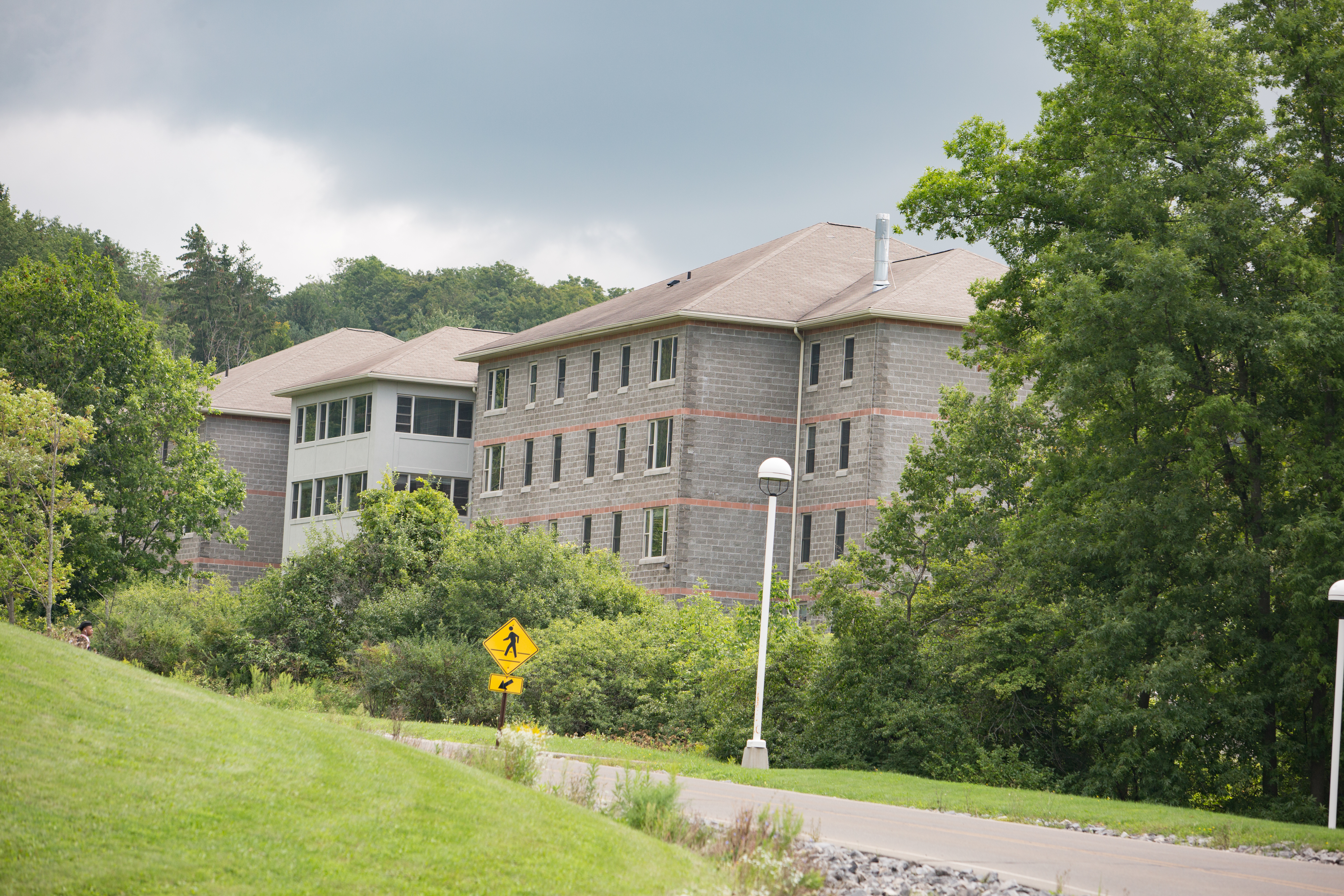
Residence Halls

== Academics ==
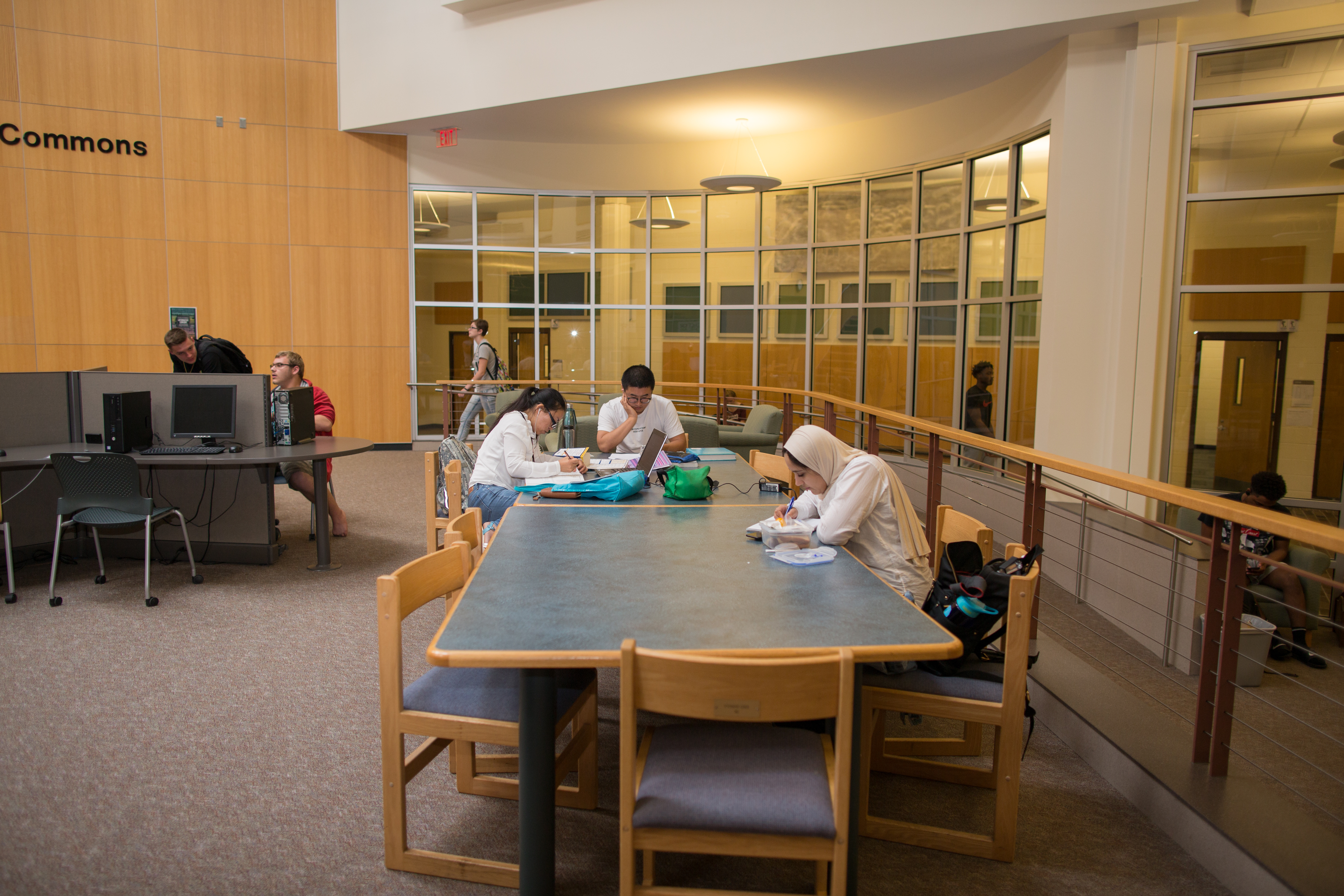
Library

Tompkins Cortland Community College offers more than 40 degree and certificate programs, including biology, biotechnology, business administration, communication and media arts, computer sciences, construction technology, creative writing, criminal justice, culinary arts, engineering science, hotel and restaurant management, liberal arts and sciences, nursing, paralegal, photography, sport management, sustainable farming and food systems, and wine marketing. About half of the Tompkins Cortland students transfer to a four-year college, with Binghamton University, Cornell University, Cortland State, Ithaca College, Niagara University, and the Rochester Institute of Technology being some of more popular transfer options.

== Athletics ==
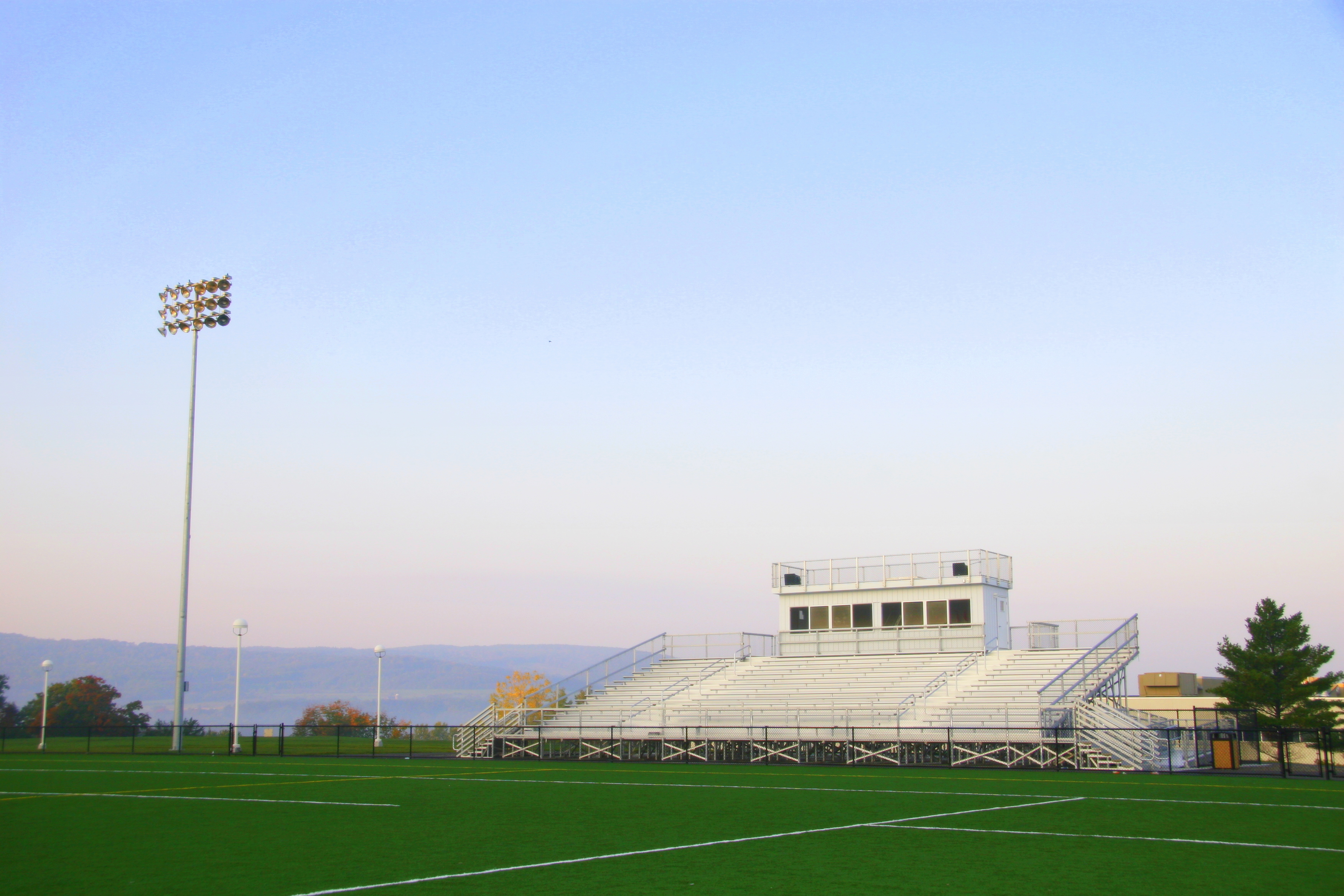
Tompkins Cortland Athletic Field

The college sponsors 9 intercollegiate athletic teams. The Panthers compete as a Region III member of the National Junior College Athletic Association (NJCAA) and as part of the Mid-State Athletic Conference. TC3 offers men's soccer, basketball, baseball, lacrosse, and golf and women's soccer, basketball, softball, and golf. The college offers a lighted turf soccer/lacrosse field, a 1,500-seat gymnasium, an 18,000-square-foot (1,700 m^{2}) field house, and on-campus baseball and softball parks. The men's soccer and golf programs and the women's soccer and softball programs are routinely nationally ranked. Dozens of former TC3 student-athletes have gone on to play at four-year institutions, often earning scholarships. Former Panthers have continued their playing careers at places like Drake University, Wofford College, Post University, SUNY New Paltz, Cortland State, and Ithaca College. In 2009 the softball team won the NJCAA Division III National Championship. In 2008, men's golfer Kris Boyes won the NJCAA Division III Individual National Championship. In 2018, men's golfer Dan Lapp won the NJCAA Division III Individual National Championship.

== Business development ==
Tompkins Cortland Biz is the college's business development and training center. Biz works with regional businesses and organizations to design and develop training programs, often helping secure funding for the training. In addition to customized training, a complete schedule of dozens of non-credit professional development programs is offered to individuals. Both on-campus and online classes are offered to help people learn skills needed to improve their positions in the workforce.

== Campus housing ==
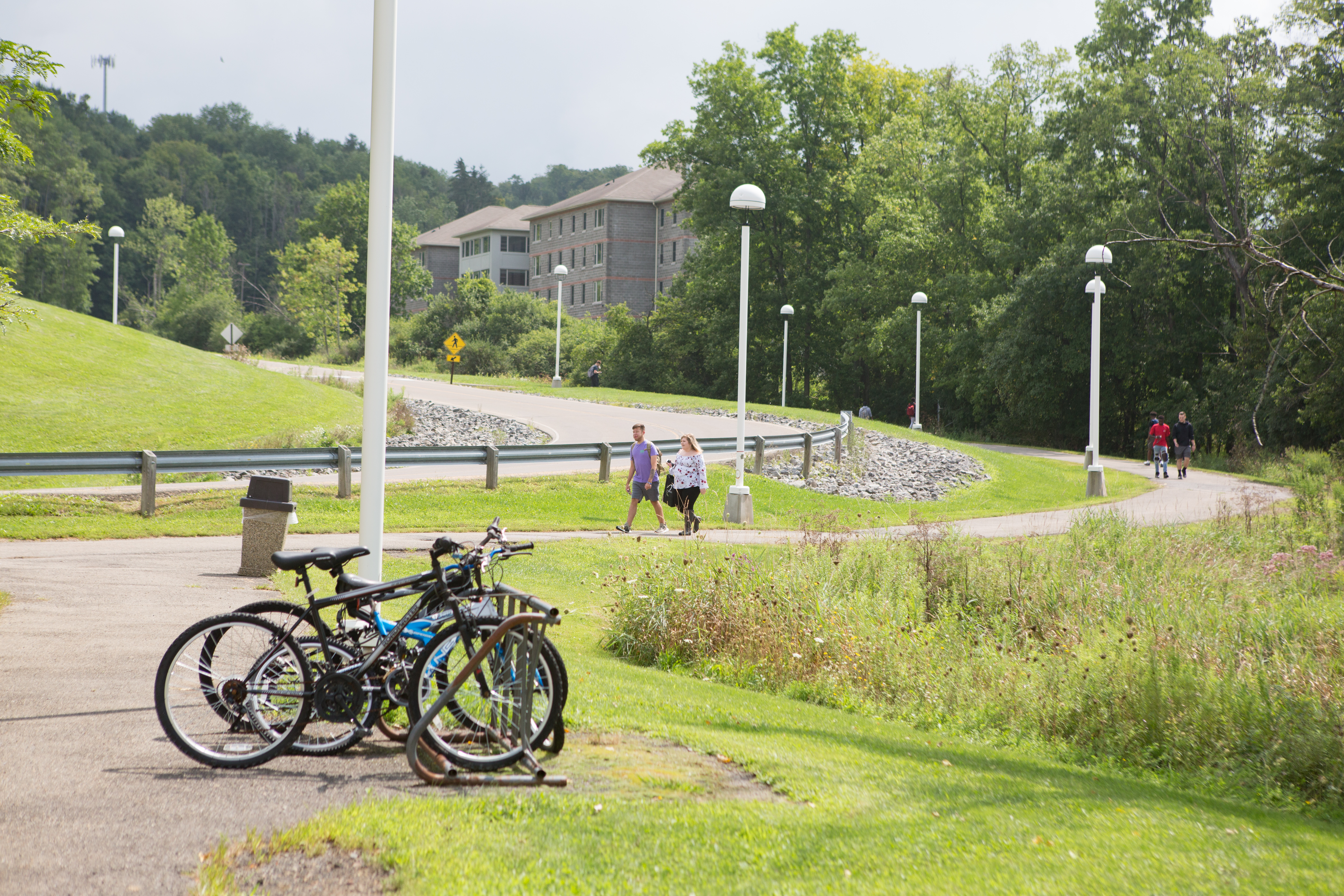
Residence Halls

Tompkins Cortland was one of the first community colleges in New York to offer on-campus housing, beginning its residential life program in 1999 with two buildings. The program has grown to now include four buildings and more than 400 bedrooms. The residence halls are all apartment style, with each apartment including three or four private bedrooms, a kitchen, bathroom, and living room area.

== Concurrent enrollment ==
CollegeNow is the college's concurrent enrollment program. Tompkins Cortland works with school districts in Central New York allowing high school students to earn college credit while taking classes in high school.

== International ==
The college partners with several institutions in foreign countries. The agreements allow international students the opportunity to study in their home institution during the regular academic year and in the United States at Tompkins Cortland for two semesters, either in the summer or during the traditional academic year. Through a combination of transfer credits and study in the United States students may receive complementary degrees from their home university and at Tompkins Cortland. All courses at Tompkins Cortland are taught in English.

Tompkins Cortland students have the opportunity to learn in a different culture through a handful of study abroad options. Students and community members have the chance to take faculty-led trips to Puerto Rico, Cambodia, Colombia, Ireland, Italy, Nicaragua, and Spain.
