= Kingston Collection =

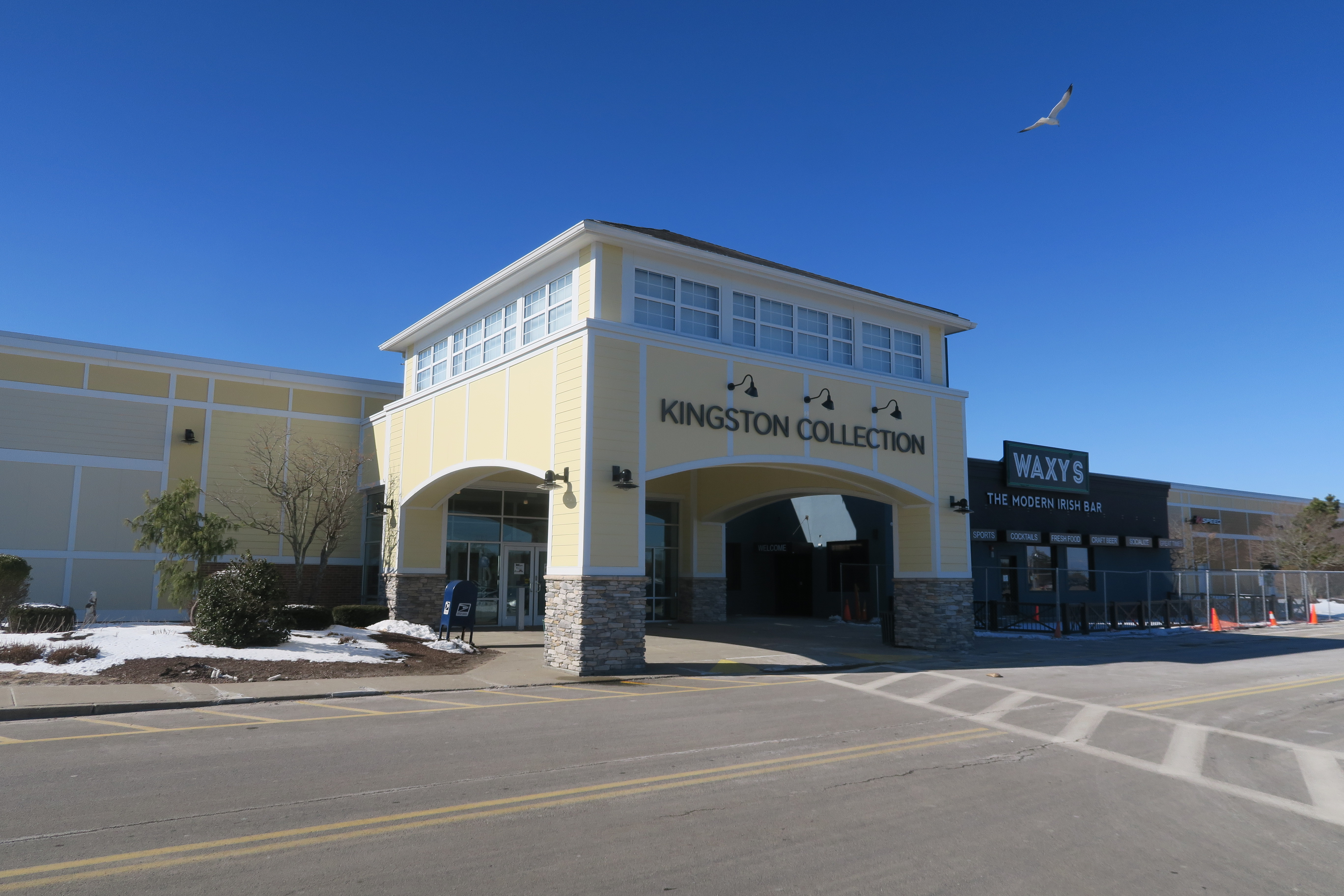
- Kingston Collection
- Location: Kingston, Massachusetts, United States
- Coordinates: 41.9762°N 70.7131°W
- Opened: 1989
- Developer: The Pyramid Companies
- Manager: Spinoso Real Estate Group
- Owner: Second Horizon Capital
- Num. of stores: 37
- Num. of anchor tenants: 3 (1 redeveloped)
- Floor area: 837,000 square feet (77,800 m^{2})
- Floors: 1 plus closed basement
- Parking: Free, uncovered
- Website: kingstoncollection.com

Kingston Collection is a one-story enclosed shopping center and mall located in the South Shore region of Massachusetts in the United States. As of December 2025, The mall features 37 stores and restaurants. The mall's anchor store is Target. It also features a Regal Cinemas. One of the anchor tenants was redeveloped into apartments on the mall grounds.

== History ==
Independence Mall opened in 1989 in Kingston. The original anchors to the mall were Filene's, Filene's Basement, JCPenney, Sears, and Hoyts Cinema.

On December 5, 2011, construction began on a brand new, 58,000 square foot Regal Cinemas 14 complex, to replace the original, out-of-date Hoyts Cinema. On November 20, 2013, plans for a drastic renovation of the mall were announced, and would include changing the entire exterior facade, an interior face-lift (including tile work, new paint coatings, and renovated restrooms), plush soft seating areas with free Wifi, new stores and dining options, and a larger selection of stores overall. Other pieces of the project included the reopening of the basement (which had not been open to the public since 1998, and would also be extensively renovated), redevelopment of the center court and the former Best Buy (which closed in 2010), and the addition of an F-100 indoor racetrack, K1 Speed.

The mall was renamed Kingston Collection in 2014. On November 11, 2014, the mall was evacuated due to a Tier2 HazMat situation. A witness in the food court said that she was getting a coffee and the lights went out, then the fire alarm went off. People also in the cinema were evacuated, with people describing the smell like pepper spray. Ambulances, Firefighters and police arrived at the scene, with two people being brought to the hospital.

On October 23, 2014, it was announced that Sears would be closing as part of a plan to close 77 stores nationwide. The store closed in January 2015. In early 2021, the former Sears was demolished, apartments were later built on that site.

On July 16, 2023, Pyramid sold the mall to the Florida-based Second Horizon Capital for $9 million. Afterward, the mall's management was turned over to Spinoso Real Estate Group.

On October 11, 2024, it was announced that Macy's would be closing in early 2025. On January 9, 2025, the store would be added to a list of 66 closing Macy's locations nationwide. The store closed on March 23, 2025, which left Target as the only anchor.
