= Lucy J. Brown =

American activist

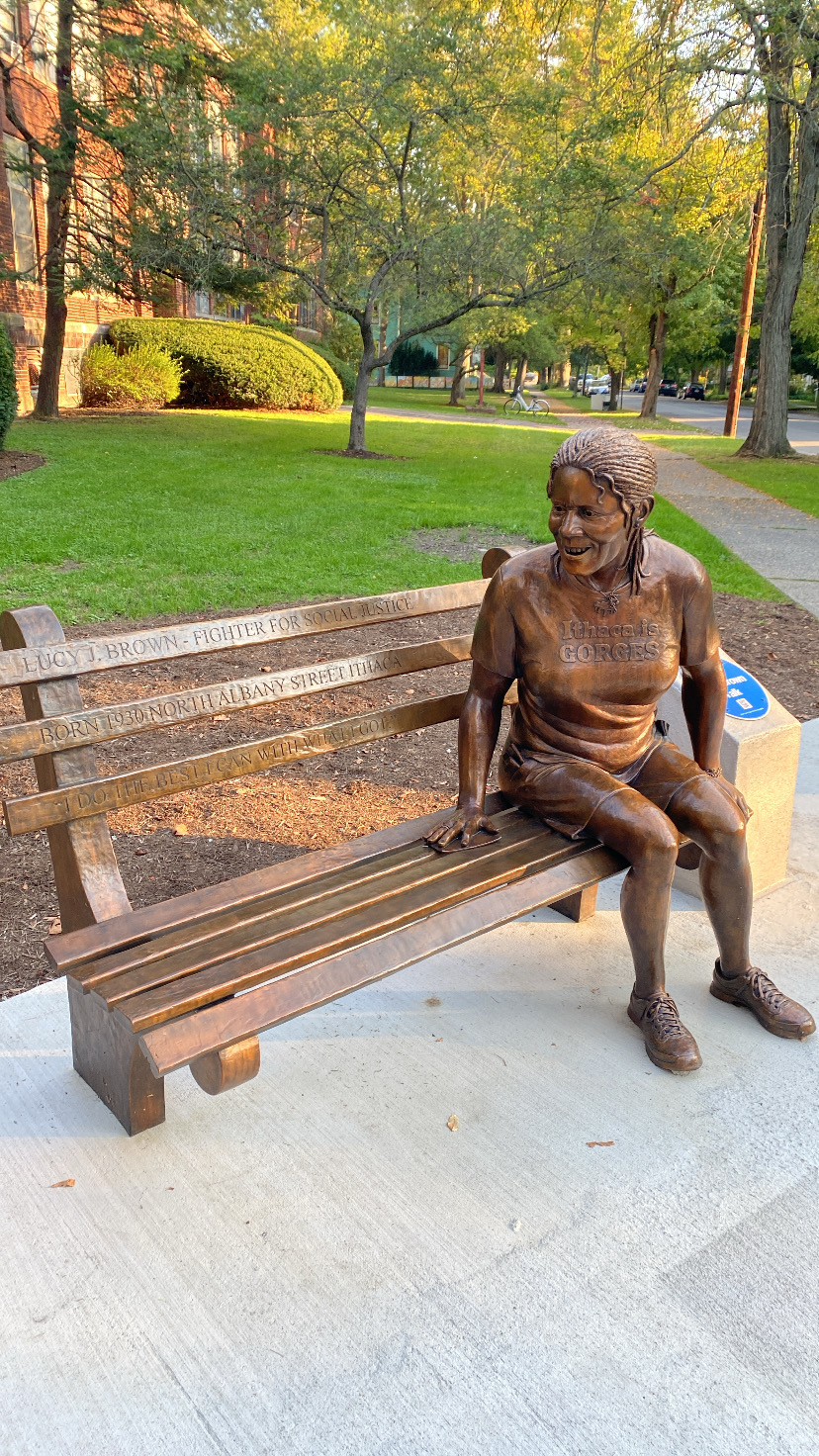
- 2024 bronze statue of Brown by Meredith Bergmann

Board Member of the Ithaca City School District

Member of the Ithaca Board of Public Works

Personal details
- Born: September 5, 1933 Ithaca, New York, U.S.
- Died: February 9, 2025 (aged 91)
- Children: 4
- Education: Ithaca High School
- Occupation: activist, public servant

Lucy J. Brown (September 5, 1933 – February 9, 2025) was an American social justice activist and public servant. She was the co-founder of Ithaca Neighborhood Housing Services in Ithaca, New York. Brown also served on the Ithaca City School District Board and on the Ithaca Board of Public Works.

== Early life and education ==
Brown was born on Albany Street in Ithaca. She attended Central Elementary School, Boynton Junior High School, and Ithaca High School.

== Career ==
After finishing high school, Brown worked for Cornell University in the Department of Education. Later, she worked in Cornell's Martha Van Rensselaer Hall and for the dean of the New York State College of Agriculture and Life Sciences at Cornell University.

She worked as an activist for racial justice, educational equity, and affordable housing. In 1976, she co-founded Ithaca Neighborhood Housing Services, a non-profit organization focusing on affordable housing in the Finger Lakes and Southern Tier regions of New York. As a board member of Ithaca Neighborhood Housing Services, Brown acted as an advocate for local residents in Ithaca's Southside neighborhood. Brown was also active in the Civil rights movement and was present at the 1969 takeover of Willard Straight Hall.

She served on the Ithaca City School District Board, the Ithaca Board of Public Works, and Ithaca Commons Council, and worked with the Ithaca Urban Renewal Agency. Brown also served as president of the board of trustees of the John W. Jones Museum in Elmira, New York.

In 2008, Brown received the Diane Sams Annual African American History Month Recognition Award.

== Personal life and death ==
Brown was married and had four children. She died at the age of 91 on February 9, 2025.

She was a member of Cayuga Temple 54 of the Daughters of the Improved Benevolent and Protective Order of Elks of the World.

== Legacy ==
Ithaca Housing Neighborhood Services created the Lucy Brown Community Award, given to community activists.

A bronze statue of Brown, made by Meredith Bergmann and commissioned by the Ithaca Historic Statues Steering Committee, was installed outside of the Henry St. John Building in Ithaca on August 16, 2024, and unveiled on August 17, 2024. The statue, featuring a QR Code with a voice recording by Brown, is part of the Talking Statues network created by David Peter Fox.
