= Tattler (student newspaper) =

Student newspaper of Ithaca High School in New York

The cover of the September 9, 2004 Tattler.

The Tattler is the student newspaper of Ithaca High School in Ithaca, New York. Founded in 1892, it is one of the oldest student newspapers in the United States. It is published ten times a year and has a circulation of about 3,000, with distribution in both the school and in the community.

The Tattler has thrice (in 2005, 2007, and 2025) won the Ithaca High School Class/Ithaca Public Education Initiative "Support Our School Community Award," an award given to the extracurricular activity "which has had the most positive impact on IHS".

== 2005 controversy ==
In 2004 and early 2005 The Tattler published a number of controversial articles, most notably several articles critical of the Ithaca High School administration and a restaurant review that some considered racist. In response, in January 2005 the Ithaca City School District issued a set of guidelines, declaring The Tattler a school-sponsored publication and giving its faculty adviser considerably greater power to edit or remove objectionable material.

A cartoon intended for the February 2005 issue, which included stick-figure depictions of sexual positions was removed by The Tattler's faculty advisor, Stephanie Vinch. The student editors refused to allow a "censored" version of the issue to be published, and appealed the decision to IHS principal Joe Wilson and ICSD superintendent Judith Pastel. Both Wilson and Pastel ultimately rejected the appeals, also finding the cartoon lewd and inappropriate for the student newspaper. Vinch soon resigned her position as faculty advisor, halting publication of The Tattler. Principal Wilson closed The Tattler office in the school.

The Tattler's logo from the mid-1930s through the late 1960s.

Publication of The Tattler went underground, running out of editor-in-chief Rob Ochshorn's house. The student staff produced a complete underground March issue, which the high school administration denied permission to distribute on school grounds because it contained the same cartoon that was earlier deemed obscene. The editors also created underground issues for April and May, which did not contain the controversial cartoon, which the school allowed them to distribute on school grounds.

IHS mathematics and computer science teacher Roselyn Teukolsky was named interim faculty advisor for The Tattler and the student staff produced the June 2005 issue back on school grounds.

Later that month, the student editors sued the Ithaca City School District, Superintendent Pastel, Principal Wilson, and Assistant Superintendent for Curriculum and Instruction Bill Russell, alleging they violated the student editors’ First Amendment press rights by censoring the February issue cartoon, prohibiting campus distribution of the underground March issue, and imposing guidelines that required pre-publication approval by the faculty adviser. On March 23, 2009, the federal trial court ruled that the district could prohibit publication and campus distribution of the cartoon, but denied summary judgment regarding the guidelines, ruling that the issue would require a trial.

The students appealed the district court's decision. In R.O. v. Ithaca City School District, 645 F.3d 533, 269 Ed. Law Rep. 464 (2nd Cir. 2011), the U.S. Court of Appeals for the Second Circuit upheld the school district's censorship of the cartoon and held that the editorial guidelines did not violate the First Amendment, relying on Supreme Court decisions in Bethel School District Number 403 v. Fraser, 478 U.S. 675, 683, 106 S.Ct. 3159, 92 L.Ed.2d 549 (1986) (First Amendment does not prevent school district from disciplining high school student for giving lewd speech at school assembly) and Hazelwood School District vs. Kuhlmeier, 484 U.S. 260, 108 S.Ct. 562, 98 L.Ed.2d 592 (1988) (schools may exercise editorial control over student speech in school-sponsored activities if "reasonably related to legitimate pedagogical concerns").

The Supreme Court denied review.

The school district revised the editorial guidelines in 2009 to mimic the language in Fraser and Hazelwood and the plaintiffs tried again to invalidate the new guidelines. In 2014, the federal district court dismissed the case as moot. R.O v. Ithaca City Sch. Dist., 5:05-CV-695 (NAM/ATB) (N.D.N.Y. Oct. 23, 2014).
