= Lansing (village), New York =

Lansing
- Village
- Location within the state of New York
- Coordinates: 42°29′16″N 76°29′10″W
- Country: United States
- State: New York
- County: Tompkins
- Incorporated: December 19, 1974
- Named for: John Lansing Jr.

Government
  - Mayor: Ronny Hardaway

Area
  - Total: 4.63 sq mi (11.99 km^{2})
  - Land: 4.61 sq mi (11.94 km^{2})
  - Water: 0.019 sq mi (0.05 km^{2})
- Elevation: 928 ft (283 m)

Population (2020)
  - Total: 3,648
  - Density: 791.3/sq mi (305.51/km^{2})
- Time zone: UTC-5 (Eastern (EST))
  - Summer (DST): UTC-4 (EDT)
- ZIP code: 14850
- Area code: 607
- FIPS code: 36-41223
- GNIS feature ID: 0955042
- Website: https://villageoflansingny.gov

Lansing is a village in Tompkins County, New York, United States, and a suburb of Ithaca. The population was 3,648 at the 2020 census.

The Village of Lansing is in the Town of Lansing and is located just north of the City of Ithaca.

== History ==
The Village of Lansing was incorporated in 1974. The area was formerly within the territory of the Cayuga tribe and later became part of the Central New York Military Tract.

Ithaca Tompkins International Airport is located partially in the eastern part of the village.

== Geography ==
The village is located at 42°29′15″N 76°29′9″W (42.487688, -76.486075).

According to the United States Census Bureau, the village has a total area of 4.6 square miles (12.0 km^{2}), of which 4.6 square miles (11.9 km^{2}) of it is land and 0.22% is water.

The village is at the south end of Cayuga Lake. It borders the Towns of Dryden and Ithaca and the Village of Cayuga Heights.

New York State Route 13 passes across the village, joining New York State Route 34, which passes down the west side of the village, south of the village line.

== Demographics ==
Historical population
Census	Pop.	Note	%±
1980	3,039		—
1990	3,281		8.0%
2000	3,417		4.1%
2010	3,529		3.3%
2020	3,648		3.4%
U.S. Decennial Census

As of the census of 2000, there were 3,417 people, 1,620 households, and 808 families residing in the village. The population density was 740.7 inhabitants per square mile (286.0/km^{2}). There were 1,705 housing units at an average density of 369.6 per square mile (142.7/km^{2}). The racial makeup of the village was 68.01% White, 5.12% Black or African American, 0.23% Native American, 22.51% Asian, 0.06% Pacific Islander, 1.40% from other races, and 2.66% from two or more races. Hispanic or Latino of any race were 3.54% of the population.

There were 1,620 households, out of which 23.3% had children under the age of 18 living with them, 41.4% were married couples living together, 6.0% had a female householder with no husband present, and 50.1% were non-families. 38.8% of all households were made up of individuals, and 6.6% had someone living alone who was 65 years of age or older. The average household size was 2.06, and the average family size was 2.82.

In the village, the population was spread out, with 18.9% under the age of 18, 11.4% from 18 to 24, 41.1% from 25 to 44, 19.3% from 45 to 64, and 9.3% who were 65 years of age or older. The median age was 32 years. For every 100 females, there were 101.7 males. For every 100 females age 18 and over, there were 99.0 males.

The median income for a household in the village was $38,185, and the median income for a family was $48,167. Males had a median income of $41,650 versus $31,181 for females. The per capita income for the village was $29,047. About 9.5% of families and 12.3% of the population were below the poverty line, including 18.5% of those under age 18 and 1.6% of those age 65 or over.

== Education ==
Much of the Village of Lansing is in the Ithaca City School District, while other portions are in Lansing Central School District. The zoned comprehensive high school of the Ithaca district is Ithaca High School.

== Notable people ==
- Karel Husa – classical composer, conductor, professor at Cornell University, and Pulitzer Prize winner
- Thomas D. O'Rourke – educator, engineer, and professor at Cornell University's College of Engineering
- Roy H. Park Jr. – son of Roy H. Park and philanthropist, who serves as chairman and president of the Triad Foundation
