= Lehman Alternative Community School =

Public school in New York, United States

Coordinates: 42.4398°N 76.5183°W

The Lehman Alternative Community School (LACS) is a public, alternative, combined middle and high school in the Ithaca City School District in Ithaca, New York. The school serves grades 6–12 with approximately 305 students.

== History ==
In 1974, parents and teachers in Ithaca, New York, rallied support on the school board to create a junior high school that would provide students with an educational experience that would be empowering, relevant and democratic. David Lehman was recruited to be the school's first principal and to help develop the curriculum. The resulting program, the New Junior High Program (NJHP) for grades 7 to 9, was housed in the old Markles Flats building on the corner of Court and Plain Streets in downtown Ithaca. In 1977, the program was moved to Ithaca High School's E-Building and, in 1978, grades 10–12 were added. The original configuration for the expanded school was two programs with the senior high named the Alternative Community High School (ACHS). In 1981, grade 6 was added, and the school was unified into a single 6–12 entity called the Alternative Community School (ACS). NJHP, ACHS, and ACS all embraced democratic shared governance by the students, staff, principal and parents. In the early years of NJHP, staff and students gathered at the beginning of each "cycle" (quarters) to hammer out a schedule of classes together. Students could offer classes and teachers could take classes. As the school grew from the original 60 or so junior high students, the scheduling by consensus became prohibitively time consuming, but to this day one of the centerpieces of the school's educational philosophy is its commitment to participatory, democratic decision making.

In 1983, the program moved to its current location in the former West Hill Elementary School at 111 Chestnut St. In 1987, the school joined the Coalition of Essential Schools, a national secondary school reform movement initiated by Ted Sizer of Brown University that emphasizes depth over breadth in education, among other key principles. This led LACS to develop its own unique set of high school graduation requirements and alternative means of evaluating student progress toward school those requirements, moving completely away from the old high school "credit system" and New York State Regents Exams. This work led LACS to be designated, in fall 1992, as one of the first fourteen "Compact Partnership Schools" under the Board of Regents and Commissioner's "New Compact for Learning", a document calling for major reforms in education for the state of New York.

Subsequent years saw changes in the membership of the state Board of Regents that resulted in a push for stricter testing requirements, despite numerous phone calls, letters and presentations to the state government by staff and students, and objections by the school's leadership. The school has fought the push for standardized testing in the legislature and in the court system as part of a consortium of New York State alternative schools.

To commemorate the decades of service of both Dave Lehman (the school's founding principal) and Judy Lehman (the school's long-time secretary), the school was renamed the Lehman Alternative Community School following Dave Lehman's retirement in 2004. In 2010, the school district added an addition to the building and enrollment grew to 305 students with a wait list of over one hundred. In 2016, the middle school component of LACS formally shifted from credits to Promotion By Exhibition and the school instituted a digital portfolio system called OxPort. LACS is one of 28 public high schools in the New York Performance Standards Consortium that oversees waivers to the Regents Exams. As part of the consortium, LACS has added Performance-Based Assessment Tasks (PBATs) in English, social studies, mathematics and science as an additional graduation requirement beginning with the class of 2017.
