= Ithaca High School (Ithaca, New York) =

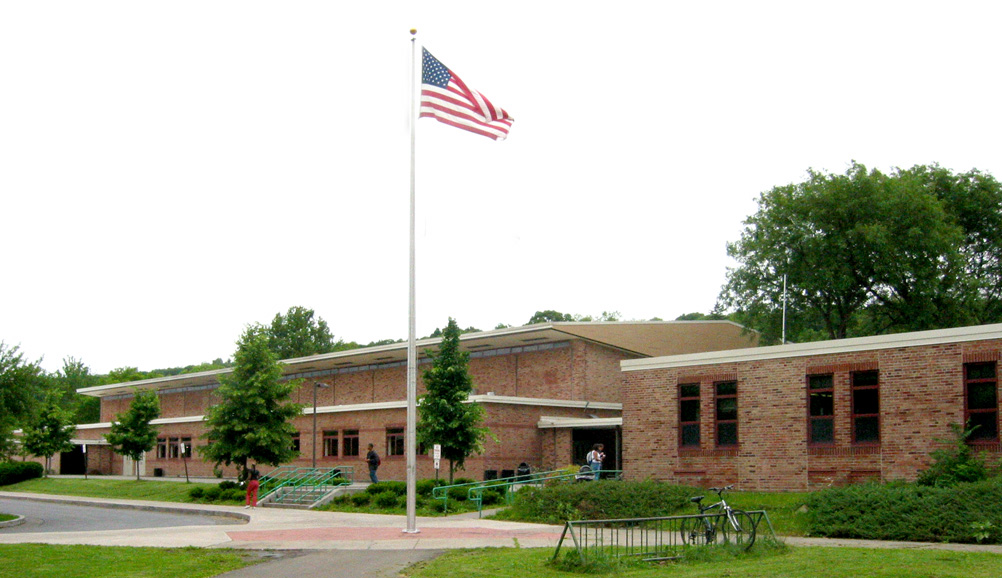
- Ithaca High School as seen from the west entrance, with main office on right and Frank R. Bliss Gymnasium on left, June 2004

Location
- 1401 N Cayuga St; Ithaca, New York; United States; 42.4553°N 76.4980°W

Information
- Type: Public
- Established: 1875
- School district: Ithaca City School District
- Principal: Caren Arnold
- Staff: 160
- Teaching staff: 107.06 (FTE)
- Enrollment: 1,362 (2023–2024)
- Student to teacher ratio: 12.72
- Colors: Cardinal and gold
- Mascot: Bear (nickname- The Little Red)
- Website: ithacacityschools.org/highschool

Ithaca High School (IHS) is a public high school in Ithaca, New York, USA. It is part of the Ithaca City School District, and has an enrollment of approximately 1,675. The school is located at 1401 North Cayuga Street in the north end of Ithaca, near Stewart Park, Cayuga Lake, and Ithaca Falls. The current principal is Caren Arnold.

== History ==
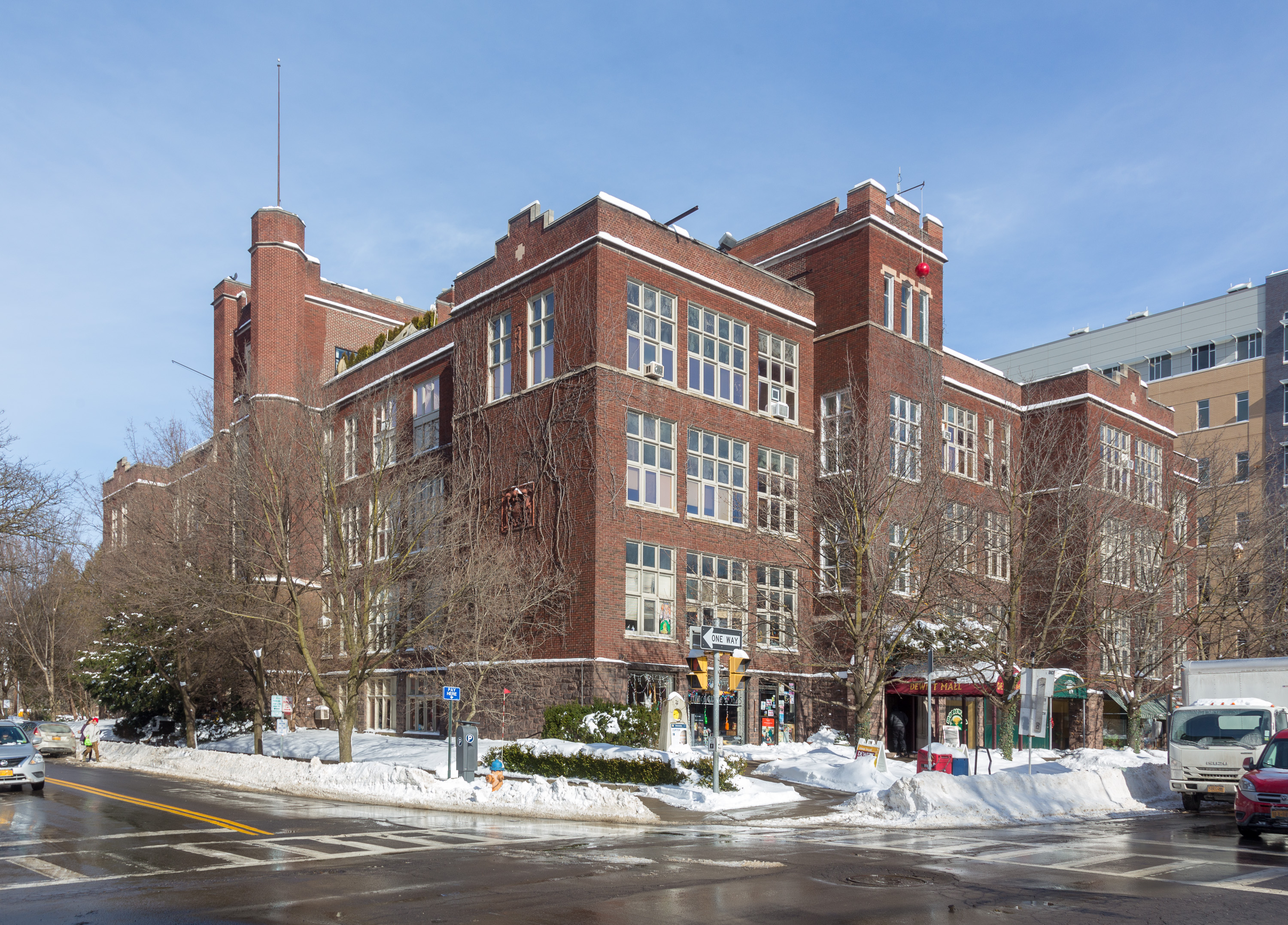
The former school, now DeWitt Mall.

Ithaca High School was founded in 1875 as the successor to the Ithaca Academy, a private school that had operated since the 1820s. In the late 19th and early 20th century, the school had a significant side business as a tuition-charging college preparatory school; then-Cornell University President Jacob Gould Schurman called it "one of the finest in the Northeast."

A new building for the high school on the site of the former academy was built in 1885; that building burned on February 14, 1912.

The renowned architect William Henry Miller, who designed many buildings at Cornell, designed the new building, which the high school occupied from 1915 to 1960. That building was later used as DeWitt Junior High school for a number of years and was saved from demolition by the local architect William Downing. Downing converted the building into an eclectic collection of shops, offices, studios, apartments, and restaurants known as the Dewitt Mall. The nationally renowned Moosewood Restaurant is also in the mall.

The new campus, which opened in 1960, is at 1401 North Cayuga Street in the north end of Ithaca, near Stewart Park, Cayuga Lake, and Ithaca Falls. Designed by the architecture firm Perkins and Will, it is a California-style campus, with 11 mostly interconnected buildings spread across a fairly wide area. Some have praised the campus as being architecturally innovative, while others have criticized it as inefficient and inappropriate to Ithaca's climate (notably as students routinely travel outdoors between classes, out of necessity or for a more direct route). The campus includes the Frank R. Bliss Gymnasium, the 840-seat Claude L. Kulp Auditorium and York Lecture Hall. Most of the Ithaca City School District's administrative offices and the Board of Education building are located on the same campus, as are the offices of the ICSD employee unions. The building is one of the few schools that use deep lake water cooling (from Cayuga Lake) for air conditioning.

From 2007 to 2009, additions were built that doubled the size of Kulp Auditorium, adding separate rehearsal, practice and office spaces for the orchestra, choir and band, as well as create a large fitness center and competition gymnasium .

Local demographics have resulted in continuing socio-economic tensions:

The [Ithaca] schools have children of professors at Cornell University and Ithaca College, who would not be rattled by a dinner-table chat about quantum physics. They also have students from Ithaca's poorer streets and from the hardscrabble farms and mobile homes in the villages that surround this Finger Lakes city.

"We have kids who live on dirt floors and go outside to the restroom and come to school to take a shower, and we have Carl Sagan's kids," said Peter Romani, a history teacher at Ithaca High School.

More recently, the school experienced difficulties in 2004 and 2007. In December 2007, over 200 Ithaca residents signed a petition calling for principal Joseph M. Wilson to be fired after what they believed was Wilson's mishandling of a series of racially charged incidents.

== Boundary ==
Much of the school district (in which this is the sole comprehensive high school) is in Tompkins County. In addition to the City of Ithaca, it also includes Cayuga Heights, much of the Village of Lansing, and the following census-designated places: Brooktondale, Danby, East Ithaca, Forest Home, Northeast Ithaca, Northwest Ithaca, Slaterville Springs, South Hill, and Varna. It also includes a small portion of Jacksonville CDP. In regards to towns, it covers parts of the towns of Caroline, Danby, Dryden, Enfield, Ithaca, Lansing, Newfield, and Ulysses.

A portion of the district is in Tioga County, where the district includes portions of the towns of Candor and Richfield.

== Academics ==
The mean SAT score in 2003 was 1169, compared to 1026 nationally. Typically, about 70% of students matriculate at four-year colleges and 20% at two-year colleges following graduation. The school traditionally sends a very large number of graduates to nearby Cornell University; from 2000 to 2004, an average of 37.6 students per class (slightly less than ten percent) matriculated at Cornell immediately following graduation.

Twenty-one Advanced Placement courses are offered.

There are 140 professional staff members, including about 120 classroom teachers, and over 85% of the faculty has a master's degree or higher. Two Ithaca High School math teachers received the Edyth May Sliffe Award, given annually to about 25 math teachers nationally: Dave Bock (twice, in 1990 and 1993), and Roselyn Teukolsky (in 1991).

== Athletics ==
The school is part of the Southern Tier Athletic Conference (STAC). Athletic teams compete as the "Little Red", in counterpoint to the "Big Red" of nearby Cornell University. Ithaca High School has won five New York State Class A boys’ ice hockey championships (1984, 1987, 1994, 2000, 2007), as well as four Upstate New York Girls' Hockey League championships (2001, 2002, 2003, 2011). The Ithaca women's varsity swim team has had more than two decades of consecutive Section IV titles and several unofficial state titles. The Boys' Lacrosse Program won five straight sectional championships from 2000 to 2005. Little Reds lacrosse team has reached the Section IV, Class A finals in both 2010 and 2011. The boys' and girls' track and field program was undefeated in dual meets for eight years until 2005. In 2005, it produced two state and federation champions.

== Music ==
From 1955 to 1967, the Ithaca High School Band received national recognition for its musicianship and innovation. During this time, the band commissioned 24 new compositions (many by Pulitzer Prize winners and some now important wind ensemble pieces), performed at locations such as the Eastman School of Music, the New York World's Fair and Rockefeller Center, and played with guest soloists and conductors including Benny Goodman and Doc Severinsen. A book, One Band that Took a Chance by Brian Norcross, was later published about the IHS band of this era.

The Ithaca High School Orchestra is one of the oldest high school orchestras in the country, having been established in 1904. It celebrated its 100th anniversary with a concert that included a newly commissioned work entitled Enlightened City by composer Robert Paterson.

== Publications ==
The Ithaca High School newspaper, the Tattler, founded in 1892, is one of the oldest high school student newspapers in the country. At times in its history (in the 1960s and 1970s, as well as more recently beginning in 2005) it has been involved in controversy over claims of unconstitutional school censorship. Paul Wolfowitz and Stephen L. Carter were both editors for the paper during their time at Ithaca High School.

== Administration ==
IHS has in recent years had very high administrator turnover. Since 1988, fourteen principals have passed through IHS, and only one has stayed for longer than three years.

In February 2008, principal Joseph M. Wilson was granted tenure in return for agreeing to resign at the end of the 2008–2009 school year. Wilson had been the subject of considerable controversy in his time at IHS. In 2005 he was sued in federal court for the alleged censorship of the school newspaper, The Tattler; the case was ultimately ruled on by the Second Circuit Court of Appeals. In December 2007, over 200 Ithaca residents signed a petition calling for him to be fired after what they claimed was Wilson's mishandling of a series of racially charged incidents in the school.

In August 2014, Jarrett Powers announced he was leaving to become Superintendent of the Union Springs Central School District. Powers was succeeded by teacher and coach Jason Trumble, who served until 2024. Trumble was succeeded by Martha Hardesty (on an interim basis) until 2025, when Caren Arnold became principal.

=== Principals ===
- D.O Barto, 1890-1892
- Frank David Boynton, 1893-1912
- Frank R. Bliss, c. 1930-1962
- Dr. John Graves, 1963-1973
- Steve Musco, 1973-1979
- John Caren, 1979-1988
- Leslie Graves, (interim), 1988-1989
- Randy Ehrenberg, (interim), 1989-1991
- George Kiley, 1991-1993
- Dr. Mark Piechota, (interim), 1993-1994
- Dr. Kathryn Hellweg, 1994-1996
- Dr. Kevin Mack, (interim), 1996-1997
- Susan B. Strauss, 1997-2000
- Ismael Villafañe, 2000-2003
- Charles LaBarbera, (interim), 2003-2004
- Joseph M. Wilson, J.D., 2004-2009
- Donald Mills, 2009-2011
- Jarett Powers, 2011-2014
- Jason Trumble, 2014-2024
- Martha Hardesty, (interim), 2024-2025
- Caren Arnold, 2025-present

== Notable alumni ==
The following is an incomplete list of notable Ithaca High School alumni:

- Andreas Albrecht, professor and chair of the physics department at UC Davis
- Dustin Brown, professional ice hockey player and Stanley Cup champion for the Los Angeles Kings
- Lucy J. Brown, activist and public official
- Andrew Byrnes, rower who competed at the 2008 and 2012 Summer Olympics
- Stephen L. Carter, professor of law at Yale University and best-selling novelist known for The Emperor of Ocean Park
- George Fletcher Chandler, first superintendent of the New York State Police
- Jacob Cornelius, rower who competed at the 2012 Summer Olympics
- Caryn Davies, rower who won a silver medal at the 2004 Summer Olympics, gold medals at the 2008 and 2012 Summer Olympics, and was the recipient of the 2023 Thomas Keller Medal
- Arthur Dean, served as chairman of Sullivan & Cromwell and chief international negotiator for president Dwight Eisenhower
- Noah Feldshuh, musician and founding member of X Ambassadors
- Daniel Mark Fogel, served as president of the University of Vermont
- James Gibbs Jr., cultural anthropologist and professor at Stanford University and Harvard University
- Walter S. Grant, U.S. Army major general
- Michael S. Hall, adjutant general of New York
- Sharon Hammes-Schiffer, professor of chemistry at Yale University
- Sam Harris, musician and founding member of X Ambassadors
- Bruce Hayes, professor of linguistics at UCLA
- Roger Evans Howe, professor emeritus of mathematics at Yale University
- Herb Jackson, professional baseball player
- Daniel Kammen, professor of energy at UC Berkeley
- Mia Korf, actress known for her role in One Life to Live
- Alex Kresovich, record producer and songwriter known for his work with Panic! at the Disco, Cee Lo Green, X Ambassadors, and others
- Matthew Levatich, served as president and CEO of Harley-Davidson
- Steven Levitsky, professor of government at Harvard University
- Disashi Lumumba-Kasongo, musician and member of Gym Class Heroes
- Enongo Lumumba-Kasongo, rapper and record producer known as Sammus; sister of Disashi Lumumba-Kasongo
- Daniel R. Mackesey, member of the National Lacrosse Hall of Fame
- Erik Cassel, software engineer and co-founder of Roblox
- Tamdan McCrory, professional mixed martial artist who competed in the UFC
- Mary McDonnell, actress known for her roles in Dances with Wolves, Passion Fish, Independence Day, Donnie Darko, and Battlestar Galactica
- Alex Meyer, swimmer who competed at the 2012 Summer Olympics
- Anil V. Rao, professor of mechanical and aerospace engineering at the University of Florida
- John Roemer, professor of political science and economics at Yale University
- Holly Rushmeier, professor of computer science at Yale University
- Kirkpatrick Sale, author who has written prolifically about political decentralism, environmentalism, luddism, and technology
- Pearl G. Sheldon, geologist
- Hugh Troy, painter who is noted for his practical jokes
- Maïa Vidal, composer, songwriter, musician, and visual artist
- Paul Wolfowitz, served as U.S. ambassador to Indonesia, U.S. deputy secretary of defense, and president of the World Bank
- James Wyatt, game designer

== See also ==
- List of high schools in New York
- The Tattler

== References and further reading ==
- Terzian, Sevan G. (2000). "The Emergence of a Comprehensive High School: Ithaca High School in Ithaca, New York, 1875-1941 (doctoral thesis)". Indiana University.
- Terzian, Sevan G. (2004). "The Elusive Goal of School Spirit in the Comprehensive High School: A Case History, 1916-1941". The High School Journal. 88 (1). University of North Carolina Press: 42–51. doi:10.1353/hsj.2004.0021. JSTOR 40364276. S2CID 142993494.
- Terzian, Sevan G. "The Founding of IHS", serialized in The Tattler, 2004–2005
- Terzian, Sevan G., & Beadie, N. "'Let the People Remember It': Academies and the Rise of Public High Schools, 1865-1890", in N. Beadie & K. Tolley (Eds.), Chartered Schools: Two Hundred Years of Independent Academies in the United States, 1727-1925, pp. 251–283. New York: RoutledgeFalmer, 2002.
