= Daniel Mark Fogel =

American academic (born 1948)

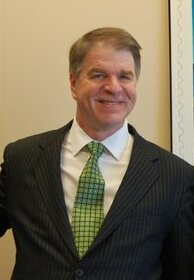
Fogel in 2009

Daniel Mark Fogel (born January 21, 1948) was President of the University of Vermont, located in Burlington, Vermont, a post he held from July 1, 2002 to July 31, 2011.

== Early life and education ==
A native of Columbus, Ohio, he was raised in Ithaca, New York, graduated from Ithaca High School in 1965 and received a bachelor's degree in English from Cornell University in 1969, as well as an MFA in creative writing and a Ph.D. in English. He is a poet, a scholar of English and American literature, and founded the Henry James Review and the Henry James Society.

== Career ==
In an editorial published in the January 1 edition of the newspaper, the Burlington Free Press named University of Vermont President Daniel Mark Fogel as the 2007 Vermonter of the Year.

During his tenure as University of Vermont president, Fogel was in part responsible for numerous salary and bonus pay increases for administrative positions, while meanwhile citing economic difficulties as reason for eliminating some faculty and other teaching positions at the university. Overall, UVM's faculty grew both in size and wealth under Fogel's presidency. The size of UVM's full-time instructional faculty grew by eight percent during Fogel's tenure; full-time student enrollment grew by forty-two percent during the same period.

University of Vermont faculty saw their salaries increase by approximately five percent per year throughout Fogel's administration due to collective bargaining agreements with United Academics. This included a 16 percent raise over three years beginning in 2003, five percent per year raises between 2006 and 2008, and five percent raises each year between 2008 and 2011.

Fogel presided over record fundraising success for the university, the establishment of an honors college, record high SAT scores for entering freshmen, and soaring graduation rates. Fogel's tenure was also marked by dramatic increases in enrollment of minority students; during his tenure, students of color more than doubled, making up 10 percent of the student body by the time of his departure from the presidency.

On March 23, 2011, Fogel announced that he would resign as president of the University of Vermont on July 1, 2012 - exactly ten years after he took office, but in fact resigned on July 31, 2011. Ex-Vice President John Bramley was appointed as the Interim President of UVM starting on August 1, 2011.

In 2012, Fogel published a new book, Precipice or Crossroads, along with co-editor Elizabeth Malson-Huddle, about the history of America's public universities, the challenges they face today, and how these institutions must evolve to remain relevant and vital. Between 2017 and 2020, he served as chair of the UVM English Department.

== Personal life ==
Fogel is married to Rachel Kahn, a painter, and they have two children.

Academic offices
Preceded by Judith A. Ramaley	President of the University of Vermont; July 2002 - July 2011	Succeeded by John Bramley (Interim)
