= Northwest Ithaca, New York =

- CDP
- Location within the state of New York
- Coordinates: 42°28′4″N 76°32′20″W
- Country: United States
- State: New York
- County: Tompkins

Area
  - Total: 3.56 sq mi (9.22 km^{2})
  - Land: 3.55 sq mi (9.20 km^{2})
  - Water: 0.0039 sq mi (0.01 km^{2})

Population (2020)
  - Total: 2,231
  - Density: 628/sq mi (242.4/km^{2})
- Time zone: UTC-5 (Eastern (EST))
  - Summer (DST): UTC-4 (EDT)
- FIPS code: 36-53853

Northwest Ithaca is a census-designated place (CDP) in the Town of Ithaca, Tompkins County, New York, United States. As of the 2020 census, Northwest Ithaca had a population of 2,231.

== Geography ==
Northwest Ithaca is located at 42°28′4″N 76°32′20″W (42.467894, -76.538980).

According to the United States Census Bureau, the CDP has a total area of 3.6 square miles (9.3 km^{2}), of which, 2.9 square miles (7.5 km^{2}) of it is land and 0.6 square miles (1.6 km^{2}) of it (17.88%) is water.

== Demographics ==
Historical population
Census	Pop.	Note	%±
2020	2,231		—
U.S. Decennial Census

As of the census of 2000, there were 1,115 people, 463 households, and 220 families residing in the CDP. While the CDP is called Northwest Ithaca, most residents refer to the area as West Hill, a designation shared with the contiguous area within the City of Ithaca. The population density was 379.8 inhabitants per square mile (146.6/km^{2}). There were 559 housing units at an average density of 190.4 per square mile (73.5/km^{2}). The racial makeup of the CDP was 93.36% White, 2.33% African American, 0.09% Native American, 1.88% Asian, 1.08% from other races, and 1.26% from two or more races. Hispanic or Latino of any race were 1.70% of the population.

There were 463 households, out of which 20.3% had children under the age of 18 living with them, 41.3% were married couples living together, 4.1% had a female householder with no husband present, and 52.3% were non-families. 42.5% of all households were made up of individuals, and 16.0% had someone living alone who was 65 years of age or older. The average household size was 2.02 and the average family size was 2.76.

In the CDP, the population was spread out, with 14.6% under the age of 18, 6.5% from 18 to 24, 24.7% from 25 to 44, 22.7% from 45 to 64, and 31.6% who were 65 years of age or older. The median age was 47 years. For every 100 females, there were 84.6 males. For every 100 females age 18 and over, there were 77.6 males.

The median income for a household in the CDP was $47,500, and the median income for a family was $62,292. Males had a median income of $50,114 versus $41,250 for females. The per capita income for the CDP was $31,271. About 4.4% of families and 4.9% of the population were below the poverty line, including 2.5% of those under age 18 and 7.7% of those age 65 or over.

== Education ==
The CDP is in the Ithaca City School District. The zoned comprehensive high school of the district is Ithaca High School.
