= Jacksonville, New York =

- Hamlet and CDP
- Location within New York Location within the United States
- Coordinates: 42°30′30″N 76°36′54″W
- Country: United States
- State: New York
- County: Tompkins

Area
  - Total: 3.62 sq mi (9.37 km^{2})
  - Land: 3.61 sq mi (9.34 km^{2})
  - Water: 0.012 sq mi (0.03 km^{2})
- Elevation: 1,024 ft (312 m)
- Time zone: UTC-5 (Eastern (EST))
  - Summer (DST): UTC-4 (EDT)
- ZIP code: 14854
- Area code: 607
- GNIS feature ID: 953901

Jacksonville is a hamlet (and census-designated place) in Tompkins County, New York, United States. As of the 2020 census, Jacksonville had a population of 516. The community is located within the Town of Ulysses, along New York State Route 96. It is 3.5 miles (5.6 km) southeast of Trumansburg. Jacksonville has a post office with ZIP code 14854, which opened on February 25, 1820.

== Education ==
The vast majority of the CDP is in the Trumansburg Central School District. A small portion is in the Ithaca City School District. The zoned comprehensive high school of the district is Ithaca High School.
