= Brooktondale, New York =

- Hamlet and CDP
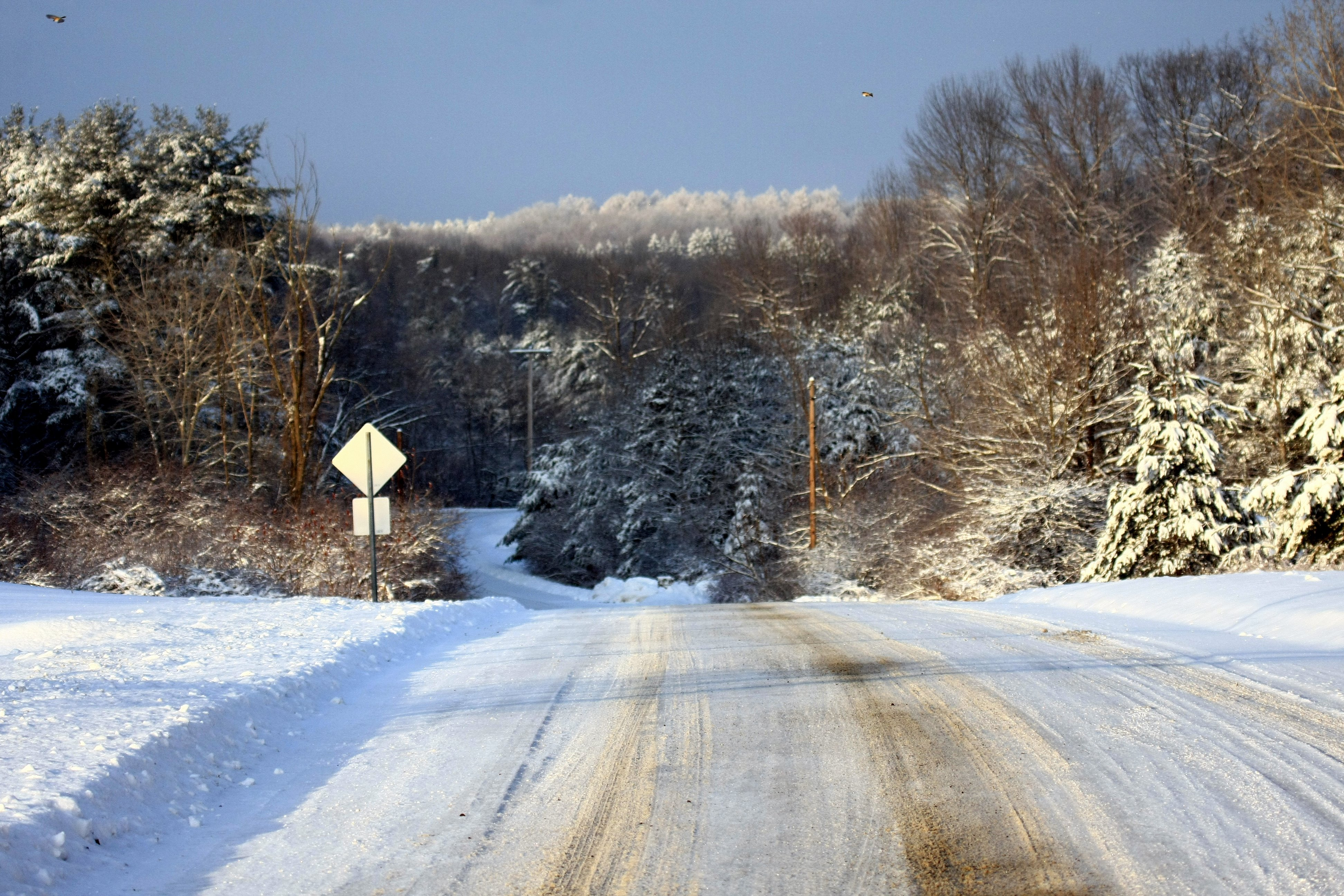
- Old 76 Road in Brooktondale

- Location within New York Location within the United States
- Coordinates: 42°22′50″N 76°23′41″W
- Country: United States
- State: New York
- County: Tompkins
- Elevation: 915 ft (279 m)

Population
  - Total: 261
- Time zone: UTC-5 (Eastern (EST))
  - Summer (DST): UTC-4 (EDT)
- ZIP code: 14817
- Area code: 607
- GNIS feature ID: 2806979

Brooktondale is a hamlet (and census-designated place) in the Town of Caroline, Tompkins County, New York, United States. The community is 7 miles (11 km) southeast of Ithaca. Brooktondale has a post office with ZIP code 14817, which opened on July 30, 1832. As of the 2020 census, Brooktondale had a population of 261.

== History ==
Brooktondale was settled in 1798 when a general's son built a log cabin on the tract of land given to him through a military land grant. The village went through many name changes before receiving its current name in 1926.

== Education ==
The CDP is in the Ithaca City School District. The zoned comprehensive high school of the district is Ithaca High School.
