= Slaterville Springs, New York =

- Hamlet and CDP
- Location within New York Location within the United States
- Coordinates: 42°23′44″N 76°21′02″W
- Country: United States
- State: New York
- County: Tompkins
- Elevation: 1,112 ft (339 m)
- Time zone: UTC-5 (Eastern (EST))
  - Summer (DST): UTC-4 (EDT)
- ZIP code: 14881
- Area code: 607
- GNIS feature ID: 973074

Slaterville Springs is a hamlet (and census-designated place) in Tompkins County, New York, United States. The community is located along New York State Route 79 8.4 miles (13.5 km) east-southeast of Ithaca, in the town of Caroline. As of the 2020 census, Slaterville Springs had a population of 208. Slaterville Springs has a post office with ZIP code 14881, which opened on August 8, 1823.

== Education ==
The CDP is in the Ithaca City School District. The zoned comprehensive high school of the district is Ithaca High School.
