= Forest Home, New York =

- CDP
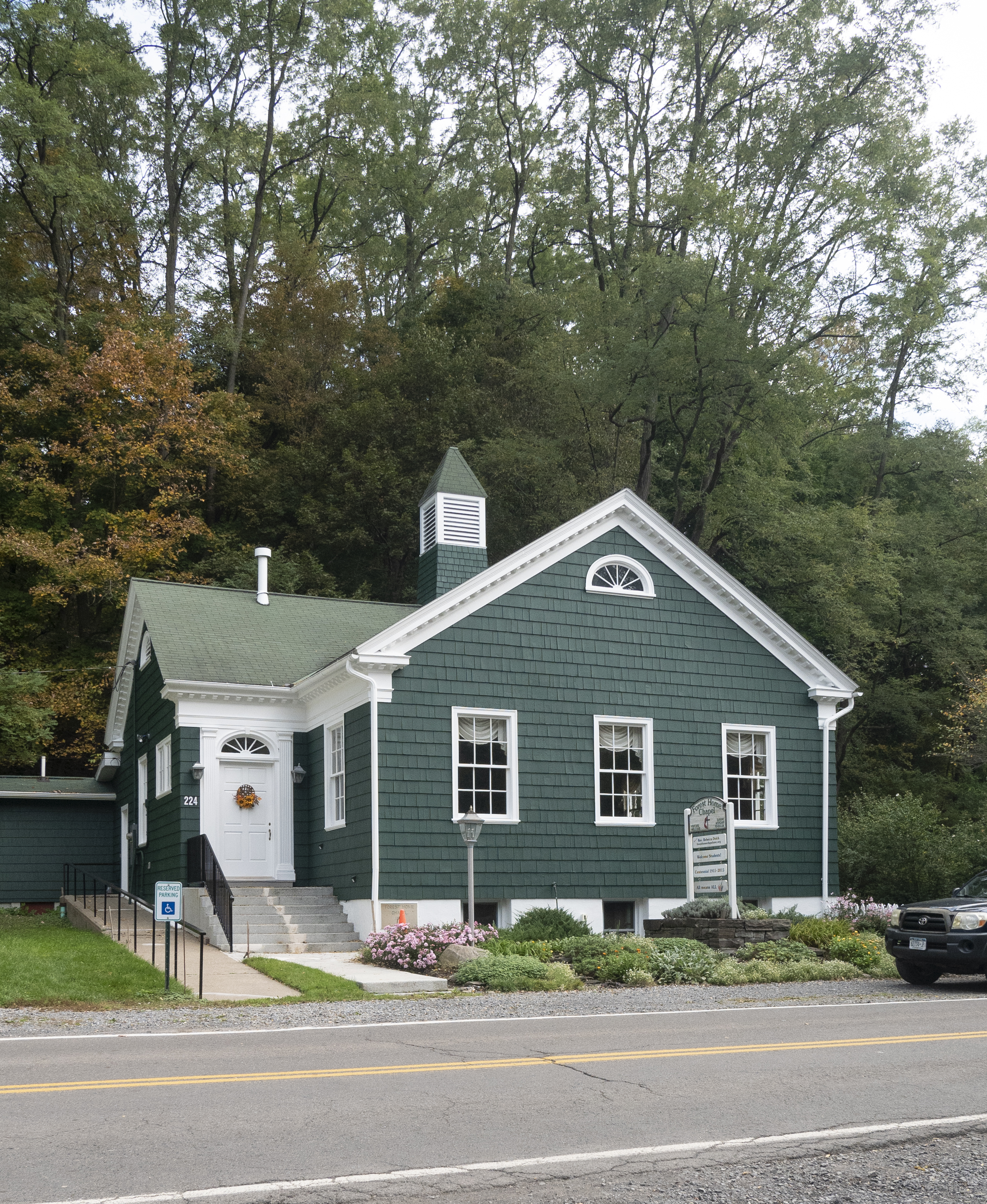
- Forest Home Chapel

- Location within the state of New York
- Coordinates: 42°27′11″N 76°28′17″W
- Country: United States
- State: New York
- County: Tompkins

Area
  - Total: 0.24 sq mi (0.63 km^{2})
  - Land: 0.22 sq mi (0.58 km^{2})
  - Water: 0.019 sq mi (0.05 km^{2})
- Elevation: 922 ft (281 m)

Population (2020)
  - Total: 1,168
  - Density: 5,190.5/sq mi (2,004.07/km^{2})
- Time zone: UTC-5 (Eastern (EST))
  - Summer (DST): UTC-4 (EDT)
- FIPS code: 36-26561
- GNIS feature ID: 0950403

Forest Home is a census-designated place (CDP) in the town of Ithaca, New York, United States. As of the 2020 census, Forest Home had a population of 1,168. It is located immediately east of the Cornell University campus.

== History ==
The first European settlers, Joseph and Martha Sydney, founded a mill on Fall Creek in 1794, and other grist and sawmills were soon constructed. During this time the community was called Free Hollow, which changed to Forest Home in 1876. Two historic steel truss bridges, both still used today, were finished in the early twentieth century. The last operating mill in the village was closed in 1926. Today, Forest Home is a small residential community nearly surrounded by the Cornell Botanic Gardens.

The Forest Home Historic District was listed on the National Register of Historic Places in 1998.

== Geography ==
Forest Home is located at 42°27′11″N 76°28′17″W (42.453158, -76.471473).

According to the United States Census Bureau, the CDP has a total area of 0.3 square miles (0.78 km^{2}), of which, 0.3 square miles (0.78 km^{2}) of it is land and 3.70% is water.

The community is located near the south end of Cayuga Lake.

== Demographics ==
Historical population
Census	Pop.	Note	%±
2020	1,168		—
U.S. Decennial Census

As of the census of 2000, there were 941 people, 424 households, and 245 families residing in the CDP. The population density was 3,598.4 inhabitants per square mile (1,389.4/km^{2}). There were 446 housing units at an average density of 1,705.5 per square mile (658.5/km^{2}). The racial makeup of the CDP was 50.58% White, 5.10% African American, 0.32% Native American, 38.36% Asian, 2.55% from other races, and 3.08% from two or more races. Hispanic or Latino of any race were 9.56% of the population.

There were 424 households, out of which 31.4% had children under the age of 18 living with them, 51.9% were married couples living together, 5.2% had a female householder with no husband present, and 42.0% were non-families. 25.5% of all households were made up of individuals, and 1.4% had someone living alone who was 65 years of age or older. The average household size was 2.22 and the average family size was 2.76.

In the CDP, the population was spread out, with 20.9% under the age of 18, 9.0% from 18 to 24, 58.0% from 25 to 44, 7.3% from 45 to 64, and 4.7% who were 65 years of age or older. The median age was 29 years. For every 100 females, there were 97.3 males. For every 100 females age 18 and over, there were 97.3 males.

The median income for a household in the CDP was $23,345, and the median income for a family was $30,759. Males had a median income of $23,092 versus $26,316 for females. The per capita income for the CDP was $17,918. About 23.3% of families and 22.0% of the population were below the poverty line, including 19.0% of those under age 18 and 25.9% of those age 65 or over.

== Education ==
The CDP is in the Ithaca City School District. The zoned comprehensive high school of the district is Ithaca High School.
