= South Hill, New York =

- CDP
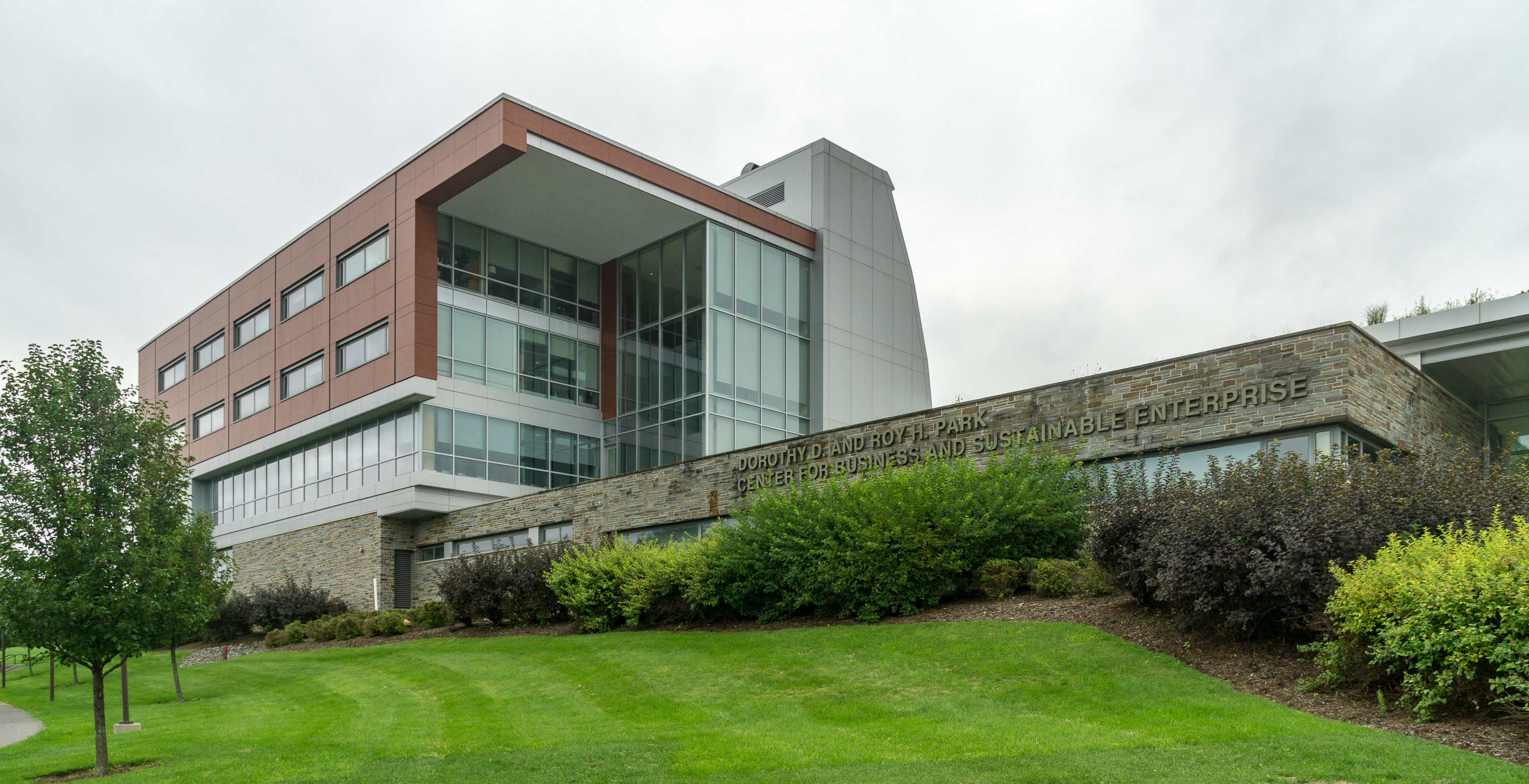
- Park Center, a building on the Ithaca College campus

- Location within the state of New York
- Coordinates: 42°24′42″N 76°29′26″W
- Country: United States
- State: New York
- County: Tompkins

Area
  - Total: 5.99 sq mi (15.52 km^{2})
  - Land: 5.90 sq mi (15.27 km^{2})
  - Water: 0.097 sq mi (0.25 km^{2})
- Elevation: 778 ft (237 m)

Population (2020)
  - Total: 7,245
  - Density: 1,228.8/sq mi (474.44/km^{2})
- Time zone: UTC-5 (Eastern (EST))
  - Summer (DST): UTC-4 (EDT)
- FIPS code: 36-69199
- GNIS feature ID: 0965771

South Hill is a census-designated place (CDP) in Tompkins County, New York, United States. The population was 7,245 at the 2020 census. The South Hill CDP is located within the town of Ithaca and it is located near the south end of Cayuga Lake. The name South Hill is shared with a contiguous area within the city of Ithaca.

Ithaca College is located in the South Hill CDP.

== Geography ==
South Hill is located at 42°24′42″N 76°29′26″W (42.411598, -76.490605). According to the United States Census Bureau, the CDP has a total area of 6.0 square miles (16 km^{2}), of which, 5.9 square miles (15 km^{2}) of it is land and 0.1 square miles (0.26 km^{2}) of it (1.50%) is water.

== Demographics ==
Historical population
Census	Pop.	Note	%±
2000	6,003		—
2010	6,673		11.2%
2020	7,245		8.6%
U.S. Decennial Census

As of the census of 2000, there were 6,003 people, 1,073 households, and 491 families residing in the CDP. The population density was 1,015.7 inhabitants per square mile (392.2/km^{2}). There were 1,139 housing units at an average density of 192.7 per square mile (74.4/km^{2}). The racial makeup of the CDP was 91.64% White, 2.42% African American, 0.13% Native American, 1.77% Asian, 0.03% Pacific Islander, 1.78% from other races, and 2.23% from two or more races. Hispanic or Latino of any race were 2.77% of the population.

There were 1,073 households, out of which 22.6% had children under the age of 18 living with them, 37.9% were married couples living together, 5.0% had a female householder with no husband present, and 54.2% were non-families. 31.6% of all households were made up of individuals, and 15.9% had someone living alone who was 65 years of age or older. The average household size was 2.44 and the average family size was 2.90.

In the CDP, the population was spread out, with 7.1% under the age of 18, 69.3% from 18 to 24, 9.2% from 25 to 44, 8.6% from 45 to 64, and 5.7% who were 65 years of age or older. The median age was 20 years. For every 100 females, there were 83.7 males. For every 100 females age 18 and over, there were 82.3 males.

The median income for a household in the CDP was $43,868, and the median income for a family was $66,364. Males had a median income of $44,500 versus $28,491 for females. The per capita income for the CDP was $11,495. None of the families and 23.1% of the population were living below the poverty line, including no individuals under eighteen and 5.6% of those over 64.

== Education ==
The CDP is in the Ithaca City School District. The zoned comprehensive high school of the district is Ithaca High School.
