= East Ithaca, New York =

- CDP
- Location within the state of New York
- Coordinates: 42°25′36″N 76°27′33″W
- Country: United States
- State: New York
- County: Tompkins

Area
  - Total: 2.19 sq mi (5.68 km^{2})
  - Land: 2.14 sq mi (5.55 km^{2})
  - Water: 0.050 sq mi (0.13 km^{2})
- Elevation: 804 ft (245 m)

Population (2020)
  - Total: 3,175
  - Density: 1,480.9/sq mi (571.79/km^{2})
- Time zone: UTC-5 (Eastern (EST))
  - Summer (DST): UTC-4 (EDT)
- FIPS code: 36-22326
- GNIS feature ID: 0949140

East Ithaca is a suburban community and CDP in Tompkins County, New York, United States. As of the 2020 census, East Ithaca had a population of 3,175.

East Ithaca is a suburb of the City of Ithaca on its eastern city line and in the Town of Ithaca. East Ithaca is immediately south of the main campus of Cornell University.

== Geography ==
East Ithaca is located at 42°25′36″N 76°27′33″W (42.426717, -76.459066).

According to the United States Census Bureau, the CDP has a total area of 1.8 square miles (4.7 km^{2}), of which, 1.7 square miles (4.4 km^{2}) of it is land and 0.04 square miles (0.10 km^{2}) of it (2.26%) is water.

East Ithaca is near the south end of Cayuga Lake, just east of the City of Ithaca. While known as East Ithaca, it is also considered to be part of East Hill, a designation shared with the contiguous area within the City of Ithaca

== Demographics ==
Historical population
| Census | Pop. | Note | %± |
|---|---|---|---|
| 2020 | 3,175 | | — |
U.S. Decennial Census

=== 2020 census ===
As of the 2020 census, East Ithaca had a population of 3,175. The median age was 30.0 years. 12.2% of residents were under the age of 18 and 17.1% of residents were 65 years of age or older. For every 100 females there were 89.2 males, and for every 100 females age 18 and over there were 86.5 males age 18 and over.

96.8% of residents lived in urban areas, while 3.2% lived in rural areas.

There were 1,657 households in East Ithaca, of which 12.1% had children under the age of 18 living in them. Of all households, 22.8% were married-couple households, 30.7% were households with a male householder and no spouse or partner present, and 40.7% were households with a female householder and no spouse or partner present. About 48.5% of all households were made up of individuals and 15.0% had someone living alone who was 65 years of age or older.

There were 1,792 housing units, of which 7.5% were vacant. The homeowner vacancy rate was 1.3% and the rental vacancy rate was 3.3%.

Racial composition as of the 2020 census
| Race | Number | Percent |
|---|---|---|
| White | 1,883 | 59.3% |
| Black or African American | 114 | 3.6% |
| American Indian and Alaska Native | 7 | 0.2% |
| Asian | 857 | 27.0% |
| Native Hawaiian and Other Pacific Islander | 1 | 0.0% |
| Some other race | 64 | 2.0% |
| Two or more races | 249 | 7.8% |
| Hispanic or Latino (of any race) | 194 | 6.1% |

=== 2000 census ===
As of the 2000 census, there were 2,192 people, 1,017 households, and 474 families residing in the CDP. The population density was 1,264.2 inhabitants per square mile (488.1/km^{2}). There were 1,061 housing units at an average density of 611.9 per square mile (236.3/km^{2}). The racial makeup of the CDP was 76.09% White, 2.74% African American, 0.23% Native American, 17.24% Asian, 0.09% Pacific Islander, 1.23% from other races, and 2.37% from two or more races. Hispanic or Latino of any race were 3.56% of the population.

There were 1,017 households, out of which 19.4% had children under the age of 18 living with them, 39.2% were married couples living together, 5.8% had a female householder with no husband present, and 53.3% were non-families. 31.7% of all households were made up of individuals, and 7.1% had someone living alone who was 65 years of age or older. The average household size was 2.16 and the average family size was 2.66.

In the CDP, the population was spread out, with 15.2% under the age of 18, 15.0% from 18 to 24, 41.0% from 25 to 44, 18.9% from 45 to 64, and 9.9% who were 65 years of age or older. The median age was 31 years. For every 100 females, there were 104.5 males. For every 100 females age 18 and over, there were 103.1 males.

The median income for a household in the CDP was $37,500, and the median income for a family was $56,742. Males had a median income of $38,676 versus $25,125 for females. The per capita income for the CDP was $23,988. About 1.5% of families and 15.1% of the population were below the poverty line, including none of those under the age of eighteen or sixty-five or over.

== Education ==
The CDP is in the Ithaca City School District. The zoned comprehensive high school of the district is Ithaca High School.
