= Pearl G. Sheldon =

American geologist (1885-1966)

- Sheldon, from the 1908 yearbook of Cornell University
- Born: Pearl Gertrude Sheldon; September 26, 1886; Lisle, New York, U.S.
- Died: February 24, 1966 (aged 79); Ithaca, New York, U.S.
- Education: Cornell University
- Occupations: Geologist, curator

Pearl Gertrude Sheldon (September 26, 1885 – February 24, 1966) was an American geologist. She was an assistant professor and curator of geology at Cornell University. Her work on joint planes in Devonian shale is considered relevant to natural gas extraction in the Appalachian region.

== Early life and education ==
Sheldon was born in Lisle, New York, the daughter of Herbert Clayton Sheldon and Rose Reed Sheldon. She graduated from Ithaca High School. She earned a bachelor's degree in 1908, a master's degree in 1909, and completed doctoral studies in 1911, all at Cornell University.

== Career ==
Sheldon was an assistant and geology curator at Cornell University. She was responsible for the university's seismograph. In 1928 she became a member of the American Association for the Advancement of Science. In 1932 she attended the laying of the cornerstone for the Paleontological Research Institution, along with other Cornell geologists. She was also a member of the Seismological Society of America and Sigma Xi honor society.

== Publications ==
- "Some Observations and Experiments on Joint Planes" (1912)
- "Mastodon Tusk in Glacial Gravels" (1915)
- "Atlantic Slope Arcas" (1916)
- "A New Dike near Ithaca, N. Y." (1921)
- "Significant Characteristics of Glacial Erosion as Illustrated by an Erosion Channel" (1926)
- "On The Association of Faulting with Dike Intrusion" (1927)
- "Some Sedimentation Conditions in Middle Portage Rocks" (1928)
- "Note on the Angle of Fracture Cleavage" (1928)
- "On the derivation of the Portage sandstones of central New York" (1929)
- "Pyramidal Jointing in Shales" (1930)

== Personal life and legacy ==
Sheldon died in 1966, at her home in Ithaca, at the age of 79. In 2010, geologist Terry Engelder spoke at SUNY Cortland on "Dr. Pearl Sheldon: Why Her Study of Jointing in Devonian Shale Really Matters to the North American Gas Shale Play 100 Years Later". "If you look back, in terms of influence a woman has had on the U.S. oil and gas industry, you'd be hardpressed to find someone with more impact than Pearl Sheldon," Engelder declared, in a 2013 interview.
