= Northeast Ithaca, New York =

- CDP
- Location within the state of New York
- Coordinates: 42°28′12″N 76°27′51″W
- Country: United States
- State: New York
- County: Tompkins

Area
  - Total: 1.47 sq mi (3.82 km^{2})
  - Land: 1.47 sq mi (3.81 km^{2})
  - Water: 0.0039 sq mi (0.01 km^{2})

Population (2020)
  - Total: 2,701
  - Density: 1,838.1/sq mi (709.68/km^{2})
- Time zone: UTC-5 (Eastern (EST))
  - Summer (DST): UTC-4 (EDT)
- FIPS code: 36-51915

Northeast Ithaca is a census-designated place (CDP) in Ithaca (town), New York in Tompkins County, New York, United States. As of the 2020 census, Northeast Ithaca had a population of 2,701.

Northeast Ithaca is a suburb of adjacent Ithaca, New York.

== History ==
Northeast Ithaca was settled in the 1950s and 1960s. It was one of the first suburbs of Ithaca, NY.

== Geography ==
Northeast Ithaca is located at 42°28′12″N 76°27′51″W (42.469927, -76.464236).

According to the United States Census Bureau, the CDP has a total area of 1.5 square miles (3.9 km^{2}), all land.

While the CDP is called Northeast Ithaca, most local residents just know it as 'the Northeast'.

== Demographics ==
Historical population
Census	Pop.	Note	%±
2020	2,701		—
U.S. Decennial Census

As of the census of 2000, there were 2,655 people, 1,058 households, and 692 families residing in the CDP. The population density was 1,825.2 inhabitants per square mile (704.7/km^{2}). There were 1,096 housing units at an average density of 753.5 per square mile (290.9/km^{2}). The racial makeup of the CDP was 74.65% White, 6.03% African American, 0.08% Native American, 15.63% Asian, 1.39% from other races, and 2.22% from two or more races. Hispanic or Latino of any race were 3.99% of the population.

There were 1,058 households, out of which 36.2% had children under the age of 18 living with them, 56.0% were married couples living together, 7.6% had a female householder with no husband present, and 34.5% were non-families. 24.7% of all households were made up of individuals, and 6.3% had someone living alone who was 65 years of age or older. The average household size was 2.50 and the average family size was 3.02.

In the CDP, the population was spread out, with 26.7% under the age of 18, 7.9% from 18 to 24, 35.1% from 25 to 44, 21.2% from 45 to 64, and 9.0% who were 65 years of age or older. The median age was 33 years. For every 100 females, there were 92.8 males. For every 100 females age 18 and over, there were 89.4 males.

The median income for a household in the CDP was $50,855, and the median income for a family was $65,833. Males had a median income of $51,250 versus $30,474 for females. The per capita income for the CDP was $24,239. About 7.3% of families and 12.1% of the population were below the poverty line, including 10.0% of those under age 18 and 3.8% of those age 65 or over.

== Education ==
The CDP is in the Ithaca City School District. The zoned comprehensive high school of the district is Ithaca High School.
