= Danby (CDP), New York =

Danby, New York
- Census-designated place
- Location within New York Location within the United States
- Coordinates: 42°21′9″N 76°28′50″W
- Country: United States
- State: New York
- County: Tompkins
- Town: Danby

Area
  - Total: 3.46 sq mi (8.96 km^{2})
  - Land: 3.46 sq mi (8.95 km^{2})
  - Water: 0.0039 sq mi (0.01 km^{2})
- Elevation: 1,238 ft (377 m)

Population (2020)
  - Total: 506
  - Density: 146.4/sq mi (56.54/km^{2})
- Time zone: UTC-5 (Eastern (EST))
  - Summer (DST): UTC-4 (EDT)
- ZIP Codes: 14850 (Ithaca); 14883 (Spencer)
- Area code: 607
- FIPS code: 36-19609
- GNIS feature ID: 2806980

Danby is the primary hamlet and a census-designated place (CDP) in the town of Danby, Tompkins County, New York, United States. It was first listed as a CDP prior to the 2020 census.

The community is in southern Tompkins County, in the north-central part of the town of Danby. It is in a valley at the headwaters of Buttermilk Creek, which flows north over Buttermilk Falls to Cayuga Inlet and then into Cayuga Lake at Ithaca.

New York State Route 96B runs through the center of Danby, leading north 7 miles (11 km) to Ithaca and southeast 12 miles (19 km) to Candor.

== Demographics ==
Historical population
Census	Pop.	Note	%±
2020	506		—
U.S. Decennial Census

== Education ==
The CDP is in the Ithaca City School District. The zoned comprehensive high school of the district is Ithaca High School.
