= Ithaca City School District =

School district in New York, United States

Address
- 400 Lake Street Ithaca, New York, 14850; United States

District information
- Type: Public
- Grades: PreK–12
- NCES District ID: 3615570

Students and staff
- Students: 5,067 (2020–2021)
- Teachers: 489.57 (on an FTE basis)
- Staff: 361.85 (on an FTE basis)
- Student–teacher ratio: 10.35:1

Other information
- Website: www.ithacacityschools.org

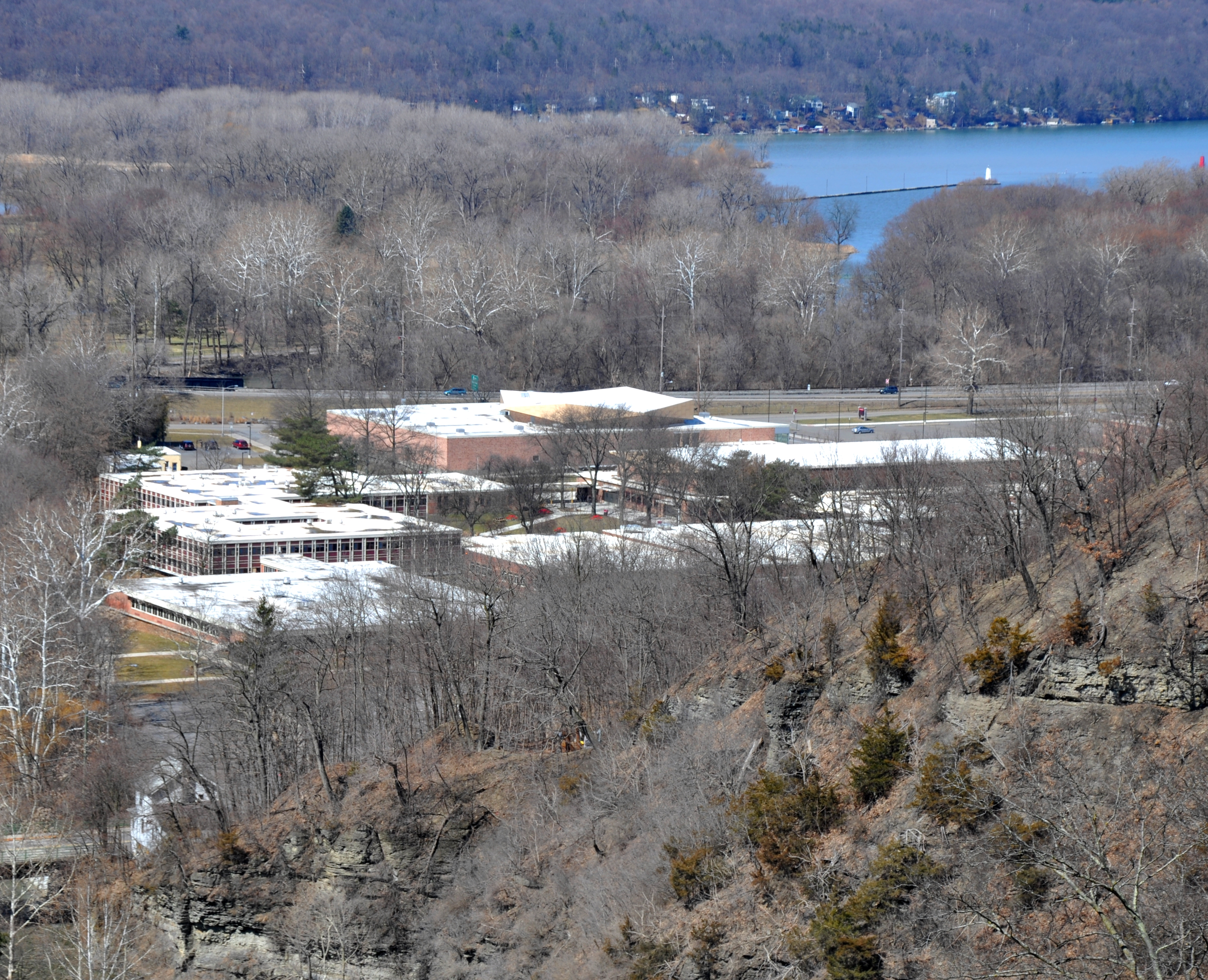
Ithaca High School from the Stewart Avenue Bridge

The Ithaca City School District (ICSD) is a public school district centered in Ithaca, Caroline, Danby, and Enfield. Approximately 600 teachers work in the district, along with 300 other professional staff members, 275 paraprofessionals, and 40 administrators, including principals.

== History ==
In May 2024, the District proposed an 8.4% tax increase to support a budget that would include 4 new electric buses, among other items.

In June 2024, following a Legal Insurrection Foundation complaint, the Ithaca City School District apologized for organizing a "students of color"-only event.

== Boundary ==
Much of the district is in Tompkins County. In addition to the City of Ithaca, it also includes Cayuga Heights, much of the Village of Lansing, and the following census-designated places: Brooktondale, Danby, East Ithaca, Forest Home, Northeast Ithaca, Northwest Ithaca, Slaterville Springs, South Hill, and Varna. It also includes a small portion of Jacksonville CDP. In regards to towns, it covers parts of the towns of Caroline, Danby, Dryden, Enfield, Ithaca, Lansing, Newfield, and Ulysses.

A portion of the district is in Tioga County, where the district includes portions of the towns of Candor and Richfield.

== Administration ==
The district's central offices are located on the Ithaca High School campus at 400 Lake Street in Ithaca. The 2020-2021 budget is $136,842,648, with approximately 65.8% coming from property taxes.

Dr. Luvelle Brown began as superintendent on January 1, 2011. He took over from Dr. Judith C. Pastel, who had been Superintendent of Schools since 1996. The district's administrative team now includes Lily Talcott, Deputy Superintendent; Robert Van Keuren, Director of Human Resources and Labor Relations; Amanda Verba, Chief Operations Officer; Mary Grover, Inclusion Officer; and Dr. Daniel Breiman, Administration Officer.

Dr. Sean Eversley Bradwell is the President of the Board of Education; Moira Lang is vice-president. There are nine members of the Board of Education elected at-large for three-year terms. Current members (with term expiration dates in parentheses):

- Dr. Sean Eversley Bradwell (2023)
- Moira Lang (2024)
- Eldred Harris (2024)
- Erin Croyle (2025)
- Dr. Jill Tripp (2025)
- Christopher Malcolm (2023)
- Dr. Patricia Wasyliw (2023)
- Karen Yearwood (2025)

== List of schools ==
- High School (Grades 9–12):
  - Ithaca High School
- Middle Schools (Grades 6–8):
  - Boynton Middle School
  - DeWitt Middle School
- Alternative Secondary School (Grades 6–12):
  - Lehman Alternative Community School
- Elementary Schools (Prekindergarten-5):
  - Belle Sherman Elementary School (founded in 1926 and named after Mary Isabella Sherman, a science and history teacher in Ithaca from 1875 to 1908)
  - Beverly J. Martin Elementary School (formerly Central Elementary, renamed Beverly J. Martin Elementary School in honor of a former student and principal in 1992)
  - Caroline Elementary School
  - Cayuga Heights Elementary School
  - Enfield Elementary School
  - Fall Creek Elementary School
  - Northeast Elementary School
  - South Hill Elementary School

== Related links ==
- Frank David Boynton, Superintendent of Schools from 1900 to 1930
- Claude L. Kulp, Superintendent of Schools from 1930 to 1951
