= Tompkins County, New York =

County in New York, United States

- County
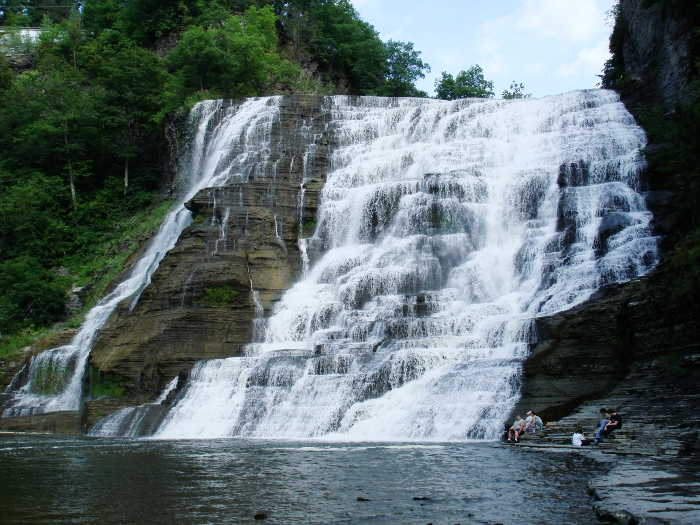
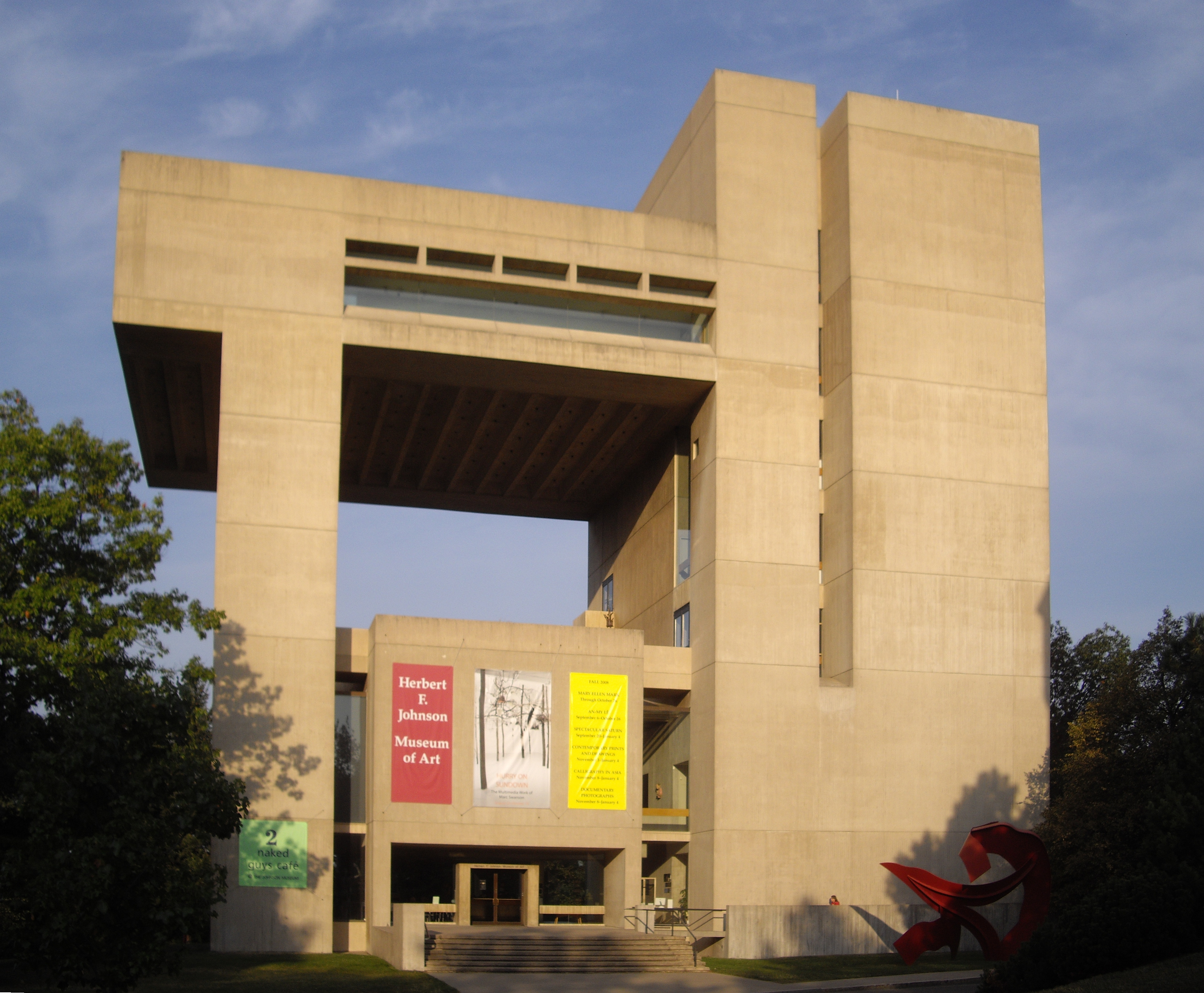
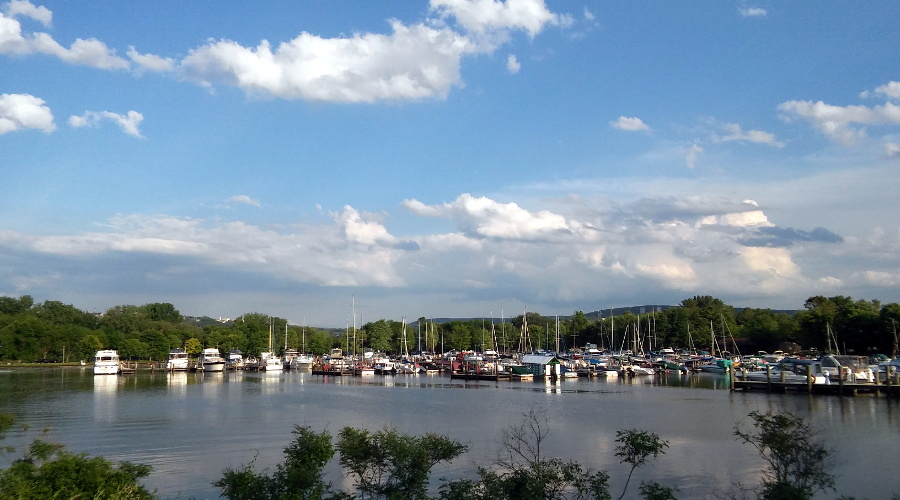
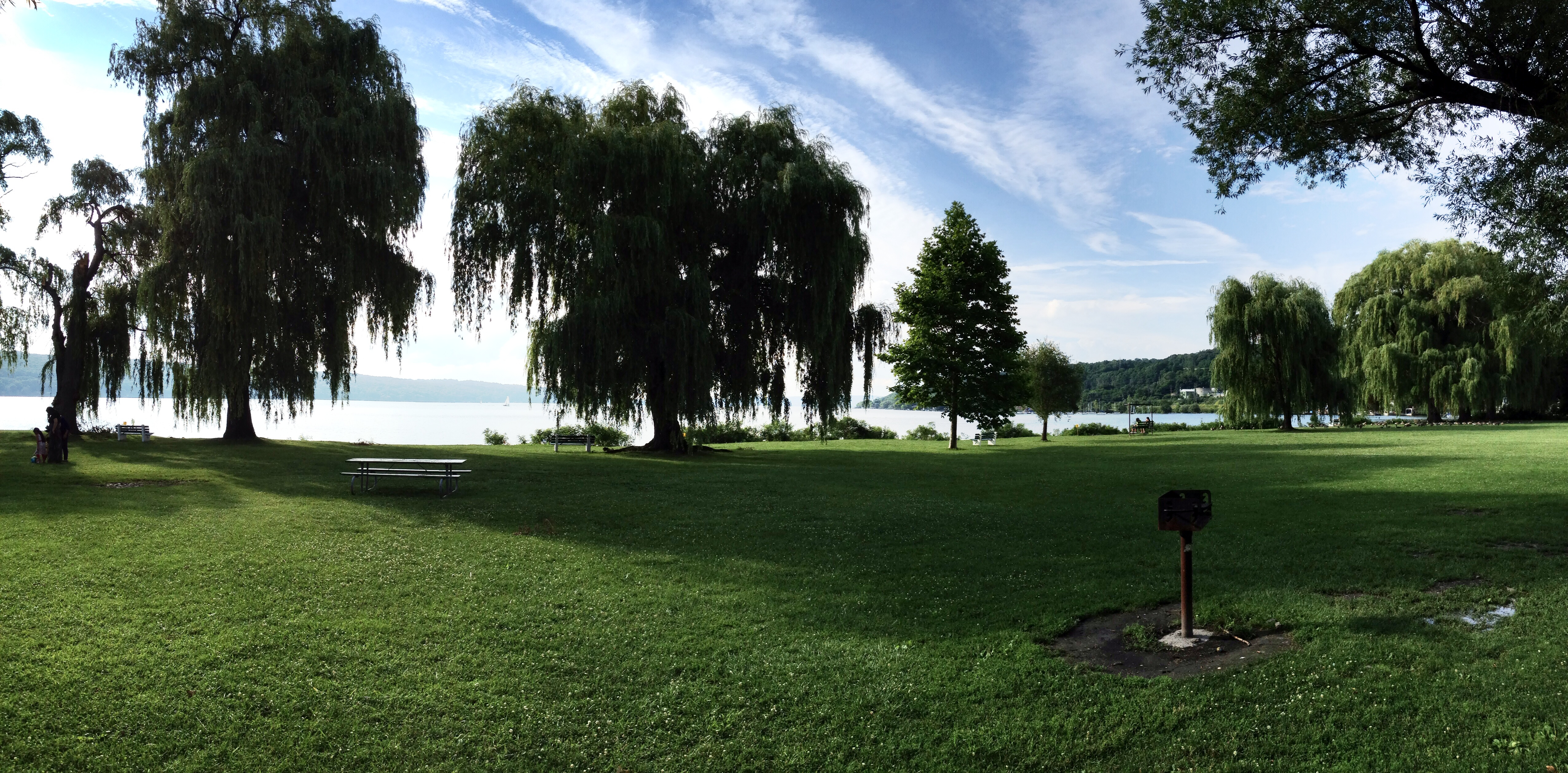
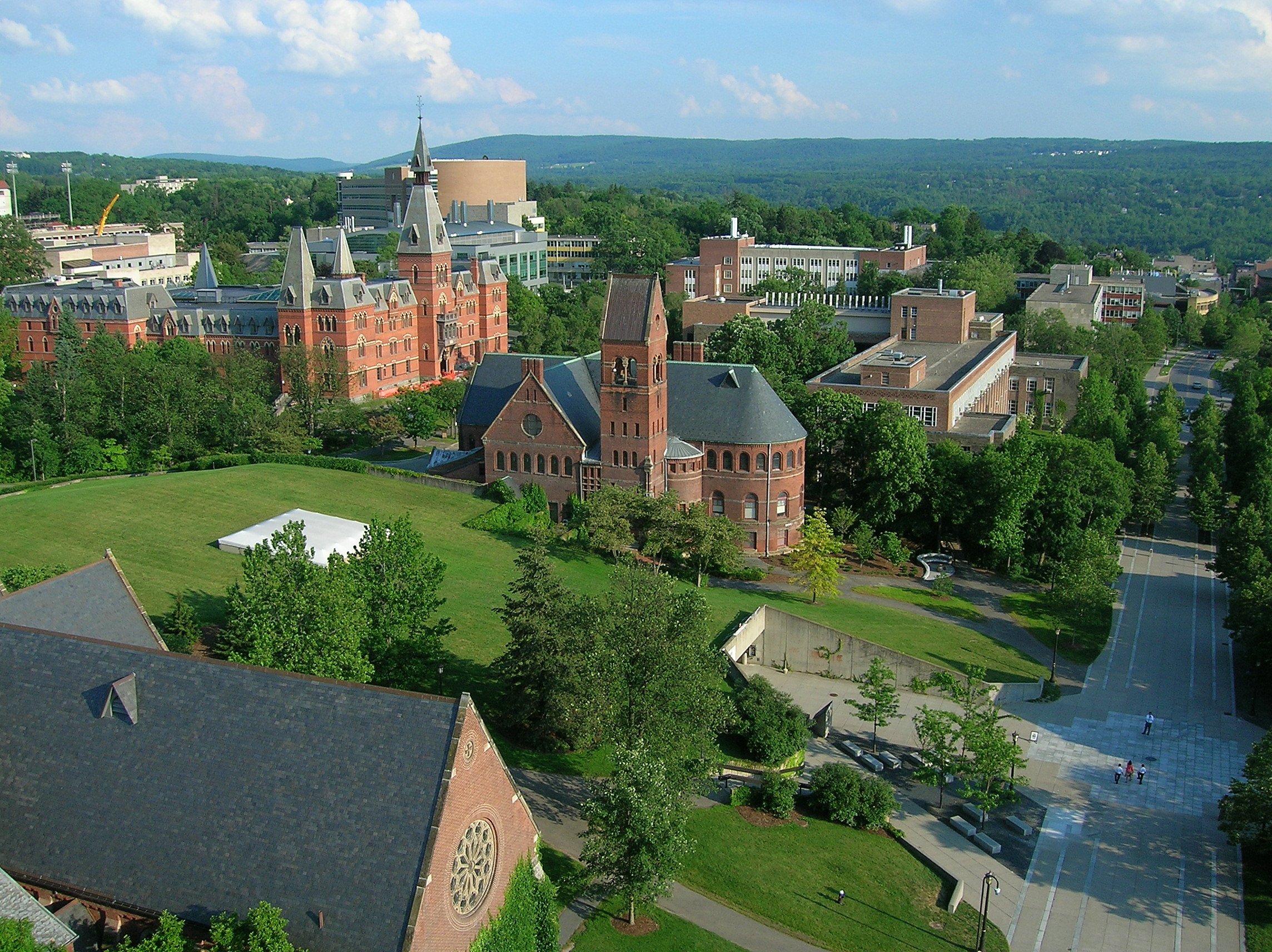
- Images, from top down, left to right: Ithaca Falls, Johnson Museum of Art, Allan H. Treman State Marine Park, Stewart Park, Ithaca Commons, and Cornell University

- Flag Seal

- Location within the U.S. state of New York
- Coordinates: 42°27′N 76°28′W
- Country: United States
- State: New York
- Founded: April 17, 1817
- Named for: Daniel D. Tompkins
- Seat: Ithaca
- Largest City: Ithaca

Area
  - Total: 492 sq mi (1,270 km^{2})
  - Land: 475 sq mi (1,230 km^{2})
  - Water: 17 sq mi (44 km^{2}) 3.4%

Population (2020)
  - Total: 105,740
  - Estimate (2025): 104,047 ▼
  - Density: 222.8/sq mi (86.0/km^{2})
- Demonym: Tompkins Countyan
- Time zone: UTC−5 (Eastern)
  - Summer (DST): UTC−4 (EDT)
- ZIP Codes: 13053, 13062, 13068, 13073, 13102, 13736, 14817, 13864, 14850, 14851, 14852, 14853, 14854, 14867, 14881, 14882, 14883, 14886
- Area code: 607
- Congressional district: 19th
- Website: tompkinscountyny.gov

Tompkins County is a county located in the U.S. state of New York. As of the 2020 census, the population was 105,740. The county seat is Ithaca. The name is in honor of Daniel D. Tompkins, who served as Governor of New York and Vice President of the United States. The county is part of the Southern Tier region of the state.

Tompkins County comprises the Ithaca Metropolitan Statistical Area. It is home to Cornell University, Ithaca College and Tompkins Cortland Community College.

== History ==
When counties were established in the British Province of New York in 1683, the present Tompkins County was part of Albany County. This was an enormous county, including the northern part of New York State as well as all of the present State of Vermont and, in theory, extending westward to the Pacific Ocean. This county was reduced in size on July 3, 1766, by the creation of Cumberland County, and further on March 16, 1770, by the creation of Gloucester County, both containing territory now in Vermont.

On March 12, 1772, what was left of Albany County was split into three parts, one remaining under the name Albany County. One of the other pieces, Tryon County, contained the western portion (and thus, since no western boundary was specified, theoretically still extended west to the Pacific). The eastern boundary of Tryon County was approximately five miles west of the present city of Schenectady, and the county included the western part of the Adirondack Mountains and the area west of the West Branch of the Delaware River. The area then designated as Tryon County now includes 37 counties of New York State. The county was named for William Tryon, colonial governor of New York.

In the years prior to 1776, most of the Loyalists in Tryon County fled to Canada. In 1784, following the peace treaty that ended the American Revolutionary War, the name of Tryon County was changed to Montgomery County in honor of the general, Richard Montgomery, who had captured several places in Canada and died attempting to capture the city of Quebec, replacing the name of the hated British governor.

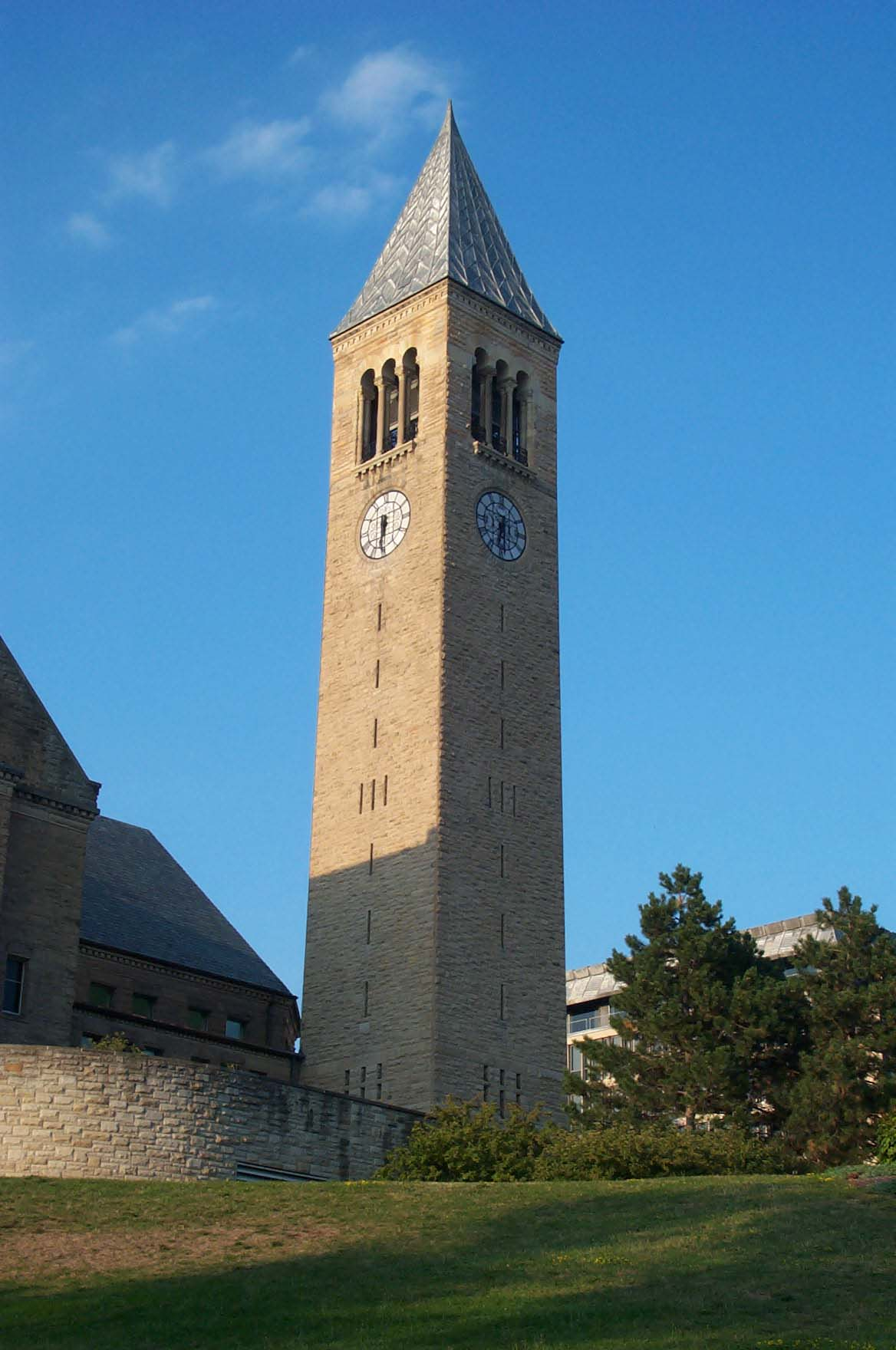
McGraw Tower, Cornell University on East Hill above downtown Ithaca

In 1789, Montgomery County was reduced in size by the splitting off of Ontario County. The actual area split off from Montgomery County was much larger than the present county, also including the present Allegany, Cattaraugus, Chautauqua, Erie, Genesee, Livingston, Monroe, Niagara, Orleans, Steuben, Wyoming, Yates, and part of Schuyler and Wayne counties.

Herkimer County was one of three counties split off from Montgomery County (the others being Otsego and Tioga counties) in 1791. Onondaga County was formed in 1794 by the splitting of Herkimer County.

Cayuga County was formed in 1799 by the splitting of Onondaga County. This county was, however, much larger than the present Cayuga County. It also included the territory of the present Seneca and Tompkins counties.

In 1804, Seneca County was formed by the splitting of Cayuga County.

On April 7, 1817, Tompkins County was created by combining portions of Seneca and the remainder of Cayuga County. The county was named after then vice-president (to President James Monroe) and former New York Governor Daniel Tompkins. Tompkins almost certainly never visited the county named for him.

In 1854, the county lost the town of Hector and the west line of lots in Newfield to the newly formed Schuyler County, New York.

== Geography ==
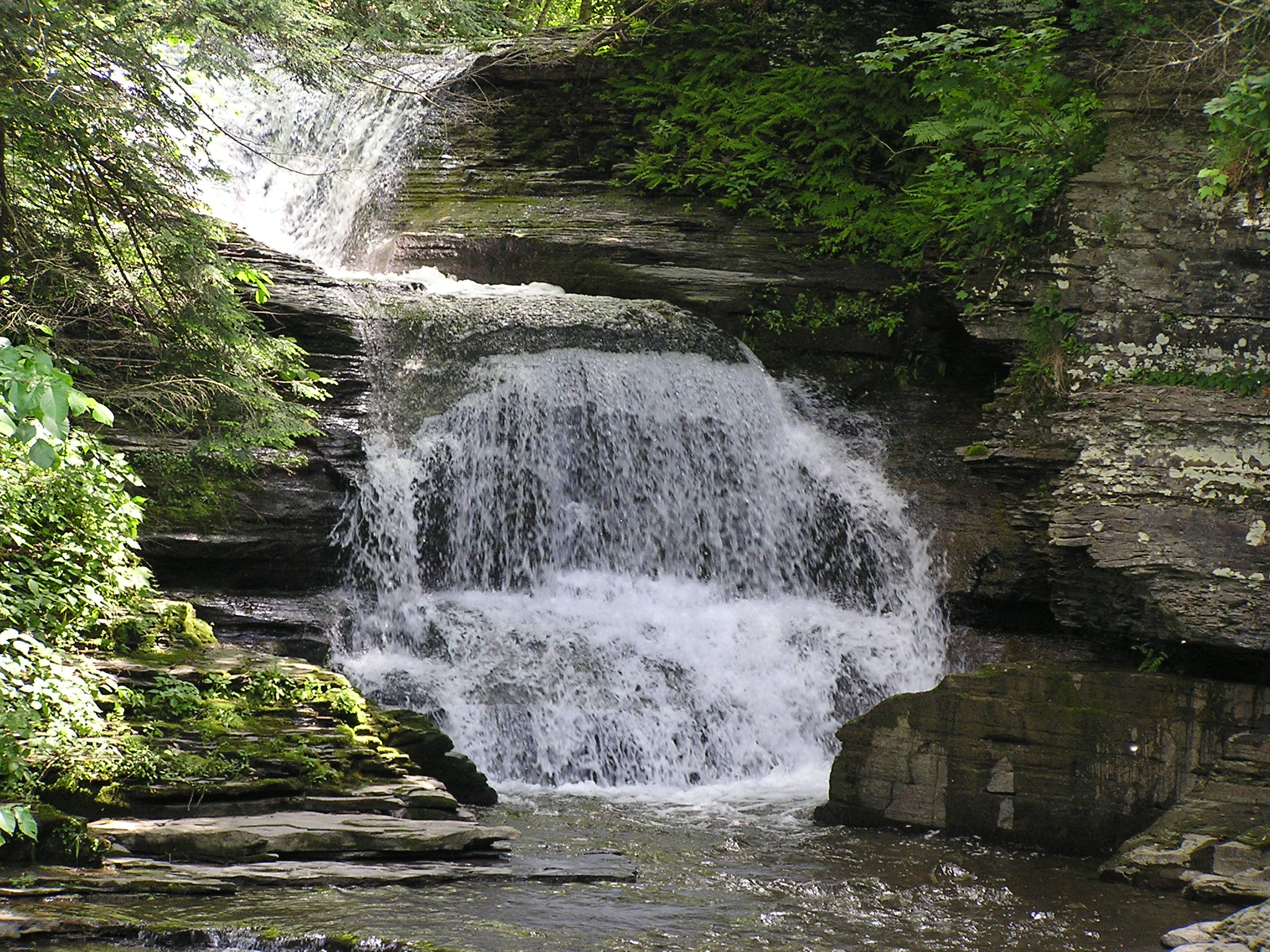
Robert H. Treman State Park in Tompkins County

According to the U.S. Census Bureau, the county has a total area of 492 square miles (1,270 km^{2}), of which 475 square miles (1,230 km^{2}) is land and 17 square miles (44 km^{2}) (3.4%) is water.

Tompkins County is in the west central part of New York State, south of Syracuse and northwest of Binghamton. It is usually geographically grouped with the Finger Lakes region, but some locals consider themselves to be part of Central New York or the Southern Tier.

=== Adjacent counties ===
- Cayuga County - north
- Cortland County - east
- Tioga County - south
- Chemung County - southwest
- Schuyler County - west
- Seneca County - northwest

=== Major highways ===
- New York State Route 13
- New York State Route 13A
- New York State Route 34
- New York State Route 34B
- New York State Route 38
- New York State Route 79
- New York State Route 89
- New York State Route 96
- New York State Route 96B
- New York State Route 222
- New York State Route 227
- New York State Route 327
- New York State Route 366
- New York State Route 392

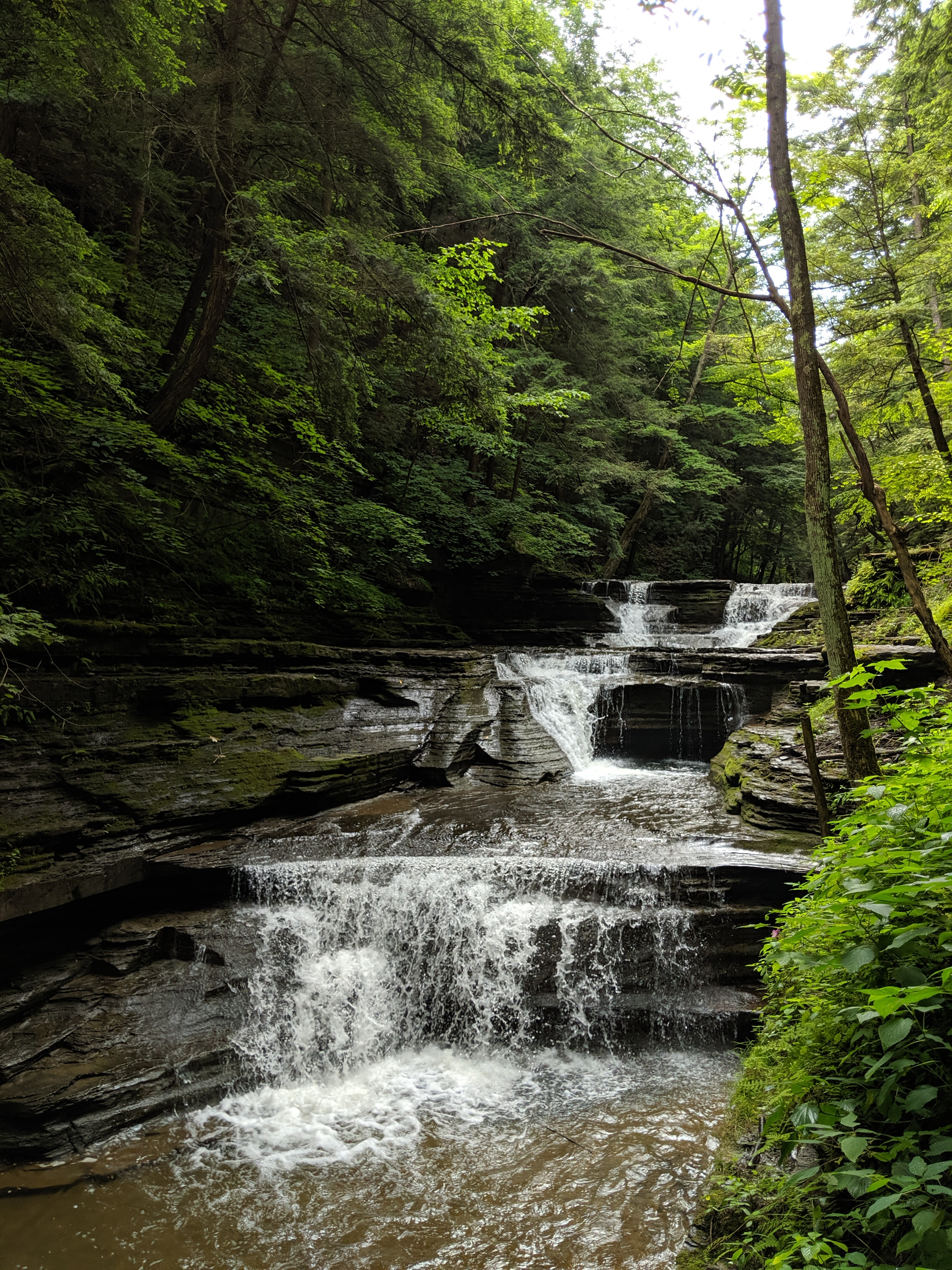
Upper Gorge, Buttermilk Falls State Park in Tompkins County

== Demographics ==
Historical population
Census	Pop.	Note	%±
1820	20,681		—
1830	36,545		76.7%
1840	37,948		3.8%
1850	38,746		2.1%
1860	31,409		−18.9%
1870	33,178		5.6%
1880	34,445		3.8%
1890	32,923		−4.4%
1900	33,830		2.8%
1910	33,647		−0.5%
1920	35,285		4.9%
1930	41,490		17.6%
1940	42,340		2.0%
1950	59,122		39.6%
1960	66,164		11.9%
1970	77,064		16.5%
1980	87,085		13.0%
1990	94,097		8.1%
2000	96,501		2.6%
2010	101,564		5.2%
2020	105,740		4.1%
2025 (est.)	104,047	▼	−1.6%
U.S. Decennial Census; 1790-1960 1900-1990; 1990-2000 2010-2020

=== 2020 census ===
Tompkins County, New York – Racial and ethnic composition Note: the US Census treats Hispanic/Latino as an ethnic category. This table excludes Latinos from the racial categories and assigns them to a separate category. Hispanics/Latinos may be of any race.
Race / Ethnicity (NH = Non-Hispanic)	Pop 1980	Pop 1990	Pop 2000	Pop 2010	Pop 2020	% 1980	% 1990	% 2000	% 2010	% 2020
White alone (NH)	80,593	83,475	80,916	81,490	76,737	92.55%	88.71%	83.85%	80.24%	72.57%
Black or African American alone (NH)	2,647	3,023	3,307	3,773	4,274	3.04%	3.21%	3.43%	3.71%	4.04%
Native American or Alaska Native alone (NH)	133	248	244	270	248	0.15%	0.26%	0.25%	0.27%	0.23%
Asian alone (NH)	1,906	5,088	6,909	8,680	10,487	2.19%	5.41%	7.16%	8.55%	9.92%
Native Hawaiian or Pacific Islander alone (NH)	x	x	33	40	35	x	x	0.03%	0.04%	0.03%
Other race alone (NH)	521	146	224	231	622	0.60%	0.16%	0.23%	0.23%	0.59%
Mixed race or Multiracial (NH)	x	x	1,900	2,816	6,260	x	x	1.97%	2.77%	5.92%
Hispanic or Latino (any race)	1,285	2,117	2,968	4,264	7,077	1.48%	2.25%	3.08%	4.20%	6.69%
Total	87,085	94,097	96,501	101,564	105,740	100.00%	100.00%	100.00%	100.00%	100.00%

=== 2000 census ===
As of the census of 2000, there were 96,501 people, 36,420 households, and 19,120 families residing in the county. The population density was 203 people per square mile (78 people/km^{2}). There were 38,625 housing units at an average density of 81 units per square mile (31/km^{2}). The racial makeup of the county was 85.50% White, 3.64% African American, 0.28% Native American, 7.19% Asian, 0.04% Pacific Islander, 1.09% from other races, and 2.26% from two or more races. Hispanic or Latino of any race were 3.08% of the population. 12.4% were of German, 11.7% English, 11.1% Irish, 9.2% Italian and 6.0% American ancestry according to Census 2000. 2.85% of the population reported speaking Spanish at home, while 1.86% speak Chinese, 1.07% Korean, and 1.00% French.

There were 36,420 households, out of which 25.80% had children under the age of 18 living with them, 41.20% were married couples living together, 8.20% had a female householder with no husband present, and 47.50% were non-families. 32.50% of all households were made up of individuals, and 8.10% had someone living alone who was 65 years of age or older. The average household size was 2.32 and the average family size was 2.93.

In the county, the population was spread out, with 19.00% under the age of 18, 26.00% from 18 to 24, 26.20% from 25 to 44, 19.30% from 45 to 64, and 9.60% who were 65 years of age or older. The median age was 29 years. For every 100 females there were 97.60 males. For every 100 females age 18 and over, there were 95.20 males.

The median income for a household in the county was $37,272, and the median income for a family was $53,041. Males had a median income of $35,420 versus $27,686 for females. The per capita income for the county was $19,659. About 6.80% of families and 17.60% of the population were below the poverty line, including 11.00% of those under age 18 and 5.40% of those age 65 or over.

== Communities ==
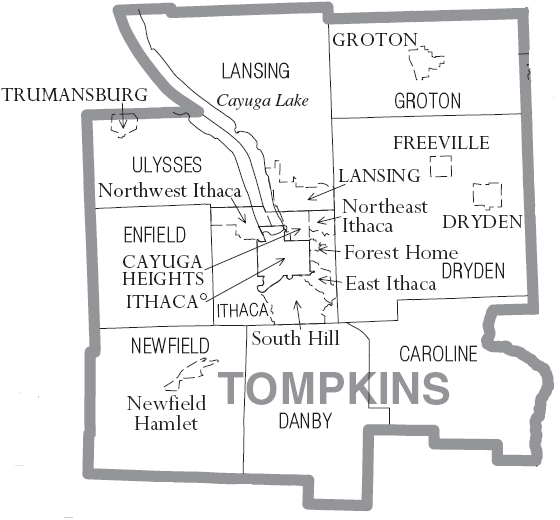
Towns, cities, villages, and census divisions of Tompkins County

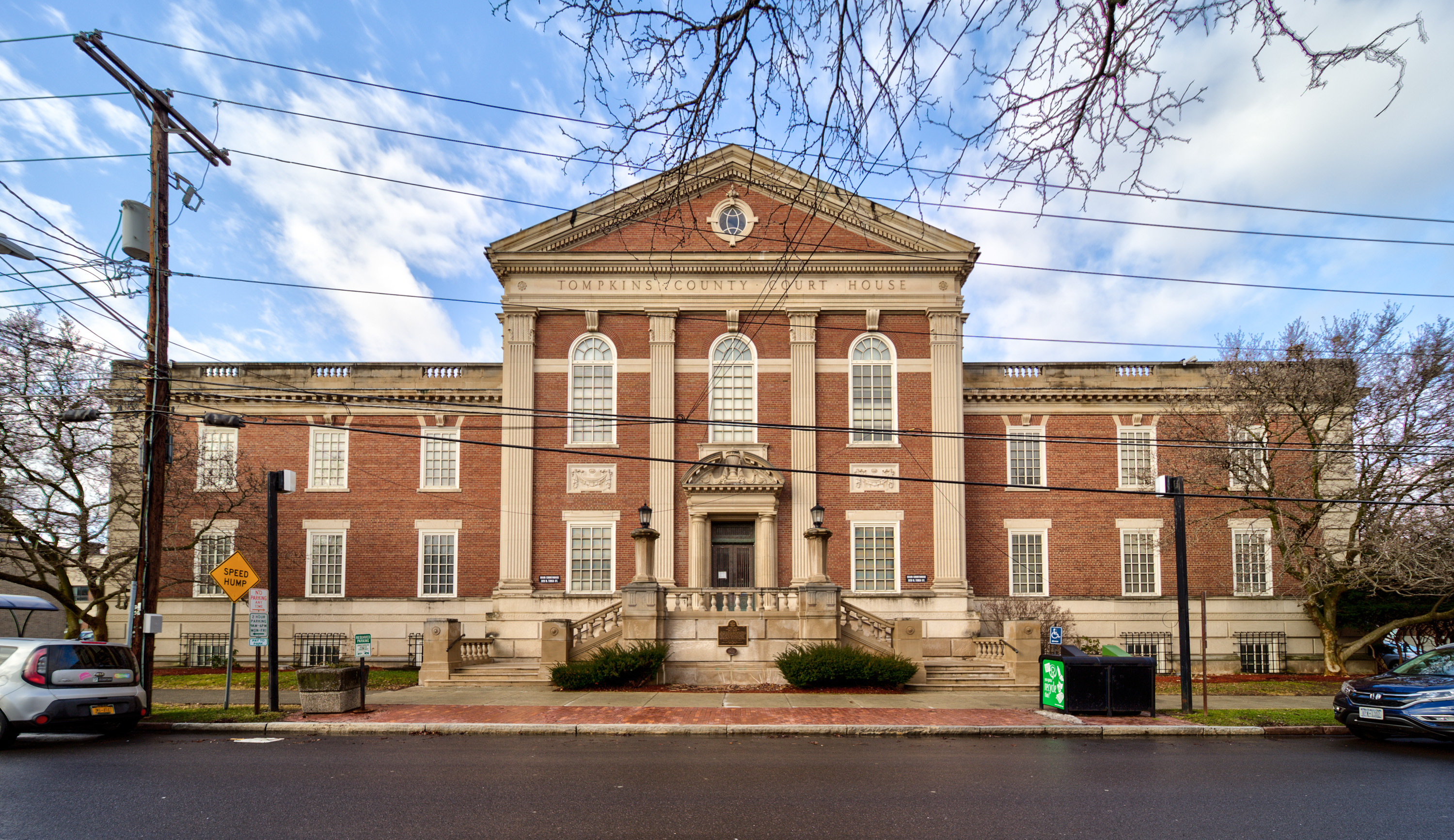
Tompkins County Court House in Ithaca

=== Larger Settlements ===
† County seat

Name	Population (2020)	Type	Area (2020)		Coordinates
Name	Population (2020)	Type	sq mi	km^{2}	Coordinates
Ithaca†	32,108	City	6.07	15.7	42°26′36″N 76°30′0″W
South Hill	7,245	CDP	6	15.5	42°24′42″N 76°29′26″W
Cayuga Heights	4,114	Village	1.77	4.6	42°27′59″N 76°29′19″W
Lansing	3,648	Village	4.63	12.0	42°29′16″N 76°29′10″W
East Ithaca	3,175	CDP	1.8	4.7	42°25′36″N 76°27′33″W
Northeast Ithaca	2,701	CDP	1.5	3.9	42°28′12″N 76°27′51″W
Northwest Ithaca	2,231	CDP	3.6	9.3	42°28′4″N 76°32′20″W
Groton	2,145	Village	1.74	4.5	42°35′13″N 76°21′54″W
Dryden	1,887	Village	1.77	4.6	42°29′21″N 76°17′59″W
Trumansburg	1,714	Village	1.39	3.6	42°32′26″N 76°39′36″W
Forest Home	1,168	CDP	0.3	0.8	42°27′11″N 76°28′17″W
South Lansing	1,078	CDP	2.8	7.3	42°32′16″N 76°30′21″W
Varna	767	CDP	0.71	1.8	42°27′18″N 76°26′17″W
Newfield (Note: Called "Newfield Hamlet" in the 2010 census)	725	CDP	1.2	3.1	42°21′43″N 76°35′32″W
Jacksonville	516	CDP	3.6	9.3	42°30′30″N 76°36′54″W
Danby	506	CDP	3.46	9.0	42°21′9″N 76°28′50″W
Freeville	498	Village	1.09	2.8	42°30′45″N 76°20′45″W
McLean	378	CDP	0.23	0.6	42°33′07″N 76°17′28″W
Brooktondale	261	CDP	0.24	0.6	42°22′50″N 76°23′41″W
West Danby	211	CDP	1.36	3.5	42°19′8″N 76°31′31″W
Slaterville Springs	208	CDP	0.26	0.7	42°23′44″N 76°21′02″W

=== Towns ===
- Caroline
- Danby
- Dryden
- Enfield
- Groton
- Ithaca
- Lansing
- Newfield
- Ulysses

=== Hamlets/Villages ===
- Caroline Center
- Enfield Center
- Etna
- Freeville
- West Danby
- McLean
- Trumansburg
- Brooktondale
- Slaterville Springs
- Cayuga Heights
- Varna

=== Communities ===
- Forest Home
- Podunk
- South Hill
- Ellis Hollow
- College Town
- Jacksonville
- Trumbulls Corners

== Government and politics ==
United States presidential election results for Tompkins County, New York
Year	Republican / Whig		Democratic		Third party(ies)	
Year	No.	%	No.	%	No.	%
1828	2,154	39.96%	3,236	60.04%	0	0.00%
1832	3,045	47.72%	3,336	52.28%	0	0.00%
1836	2,786	48.70%	2,935	51.30%	0	0.00%
1840	3,969	52.51%	3,558	47.07%	32	0.42%
1844	3,845	47.00%	4,013	49.06%	322	3.94%
1848	3,003	43.26%	1,270	18.29%	2,669	38.45%
1852	3,410	44.03%	3,472	44.83%	863	11.14%
1856	4,019	58.09%	1,430	20.67%	1,470	21.25%
1860	4,348	58.96%	3,026	41.04%	0	0.00%
1864	4,518	60.13%	2,996	39.87%	0	0.00%
1868	4,646	59.98%	3,100	40.02%	0	0.00%
1872	4,318	55.70%	3,369	43.46%	65	0.84%
1876	5,032	54.75%	4,028	43.83%	131	1.43%
1880	4,896	53.03%	3,956	42.85%	380	4.12%
1884	4,420	48.83%	3,992	44.10%	640	7.07%
1888	5,073	54.18%	3,909	41.75%	381	4.07%
1892	4,717	53.52%	3,404	38.62%	692	7.85%
1896	5,342	58.07%	3,506	38.11%	352	3.83%
1900	5,409	55.79%	3,852	39.73%	435	4.49%
1904	5,414	56.31%	3,780	39.31%	421	4.38%
1908	5,090	55.13%	3,734	40.45%	408	4.42%
1912	2,237	27.61%	3,272	40.38%	2,594	32.01%
1916	4,736	54.83%	3,455	40.00%	447	5.17%
1920	9,508	70.05%	3,487	25.69%	578	4.26%
1924	11,766	72.98%	3,701	22.95%	656	4.07%
1928	14,471	72.84%	5,114	25.74%	281	1.41%
1932	12,185	64.42%	6,180	32.67%	551	2.91%
1936	13,332	64.26%	7,007	33.78%	407	1.96%
1940	14,325	66.04%	7,118	32.81%	250	1.15%
1944	12,805	63.86%	7,174	35.78%	74	0.37%
1948	13,719	67.11%	5,721	27.98%	1,004	4.91%
1952	18,673	74.66%	6,285	25.13%	54	0.22%
1956	19,749	78.29%	5,475	21.71%	0	0.00%
1960	17,061	66.30%	8,659	33.65%	13	0.05%
1964	9,070	35.99%	16,103	63.90%	29	0.12%
1968	13,446	53.26%	10,343	40.97%	1,459	5.78%
1972	17,605	58.66%	12,344	41.13%	62	0.21%
1976	15,463	53.93%	12,808	44.67%	400	1.40%
1980	12,448	41.96%	11,970	40.35%	5,250	17.70%
1984	18,255	48.32%	19,357	51.24%	165	0.44%
1988	14,932	40.69%	21,455	58.46%	312	0.85%
1992	11,520	27.65%	23,197	55.68%	6,943	16.67%
1996	11,532	31.06%	20,772	55.95%	4,820	12.98%
2000	13,351	33.33%	21,807	54.44%	4,902	12.24%
2004	13,994	32.99%	27,229	64.19%	1,198	2.82%
2008	11,927	28.03%	29,826	70.09%	799	1.88%
2012	11,107	27.92%	27,244	68.48%	1,430	3.59%
2016	10,371	24.30%	28,890	67.69%	3,417	8.01%
2020	11,096	24.26%	33,619	73.51%	1,020	2.23%
2024	11,354	24.21%	34,631	73.84%	917	1.96%

Tompkins County was once a reliably Republican county. From 1856 to 1980, the only Democratic candidates to carry it in a presidential election were Woodrow Wilson in 1912 and Lyndon B. Johnson in 1964. However, Democrats have won Tompkins County in every presidential election since 1984, starting with Walter Mondale's 2.92% victory margin over then-president Ronald Reagan. The dominant presence of Cornell University in Ithaca is a crucial factor in Democrats' success in the county. In 2008, Tompkins County was the only county in New York State in which Senator Barack Obama beat Senator Hillary Clinton in the Democratic primary. In the 2008 United States presidential election, Obama won the county by a 41% margin over John McCain, with Obama winning by 25.5% statewide. It was his highest percentage by county in upstate New York. In 2016 the county strongly supported Clinton over Trump (67.7% to 24.3%).

It swung even further to Joe Biden in 2020, who took 73.5% to 24.3% for Trump, the highest voteshare it has given any candidate since 1956 when incumbent president Dwight D. Eisenhower won the county with 78.3% of the vote. In 2024, it was one of only two counties in New York State where Kamala Harris performed better than Biden had. In this election it was the second-most Democratic out of all New York counties, only bested by Manhattan, due to the rightward shifts of Brooklyn and The Bronx. Harris had the best performance by a Democratic nominee in the county's history.

The Tompkins County Legislature consists of fifteen members, each from a single-member district. In November 2014, the Tompkins County legislature unanimously adopted a resolution recognizing freedom from domestic violence as a fundamental human right. In doing so, Tompkins County became the first rural county in the United States to pass such a resolution.

Voter registration as of April 1, 2016
Party	Active voters	Inactive voters	Total voters	Percentage
Democratic	25,749	3,768	29,517	49.54%
Republican	11,623	1,290	12,913	21.67%
Unaffiliated	10,730	2,461	13,191	22.14%
Other (Note: Included are voters affiliated with the Conservative Party, Green Party, Working Families Party, Independence Party, Women's Equality Party, Reform Party, and other small parties.)	3,385	575	3,960	6.65%
Total	51,487	8,094	59,581	100%

== Education ==
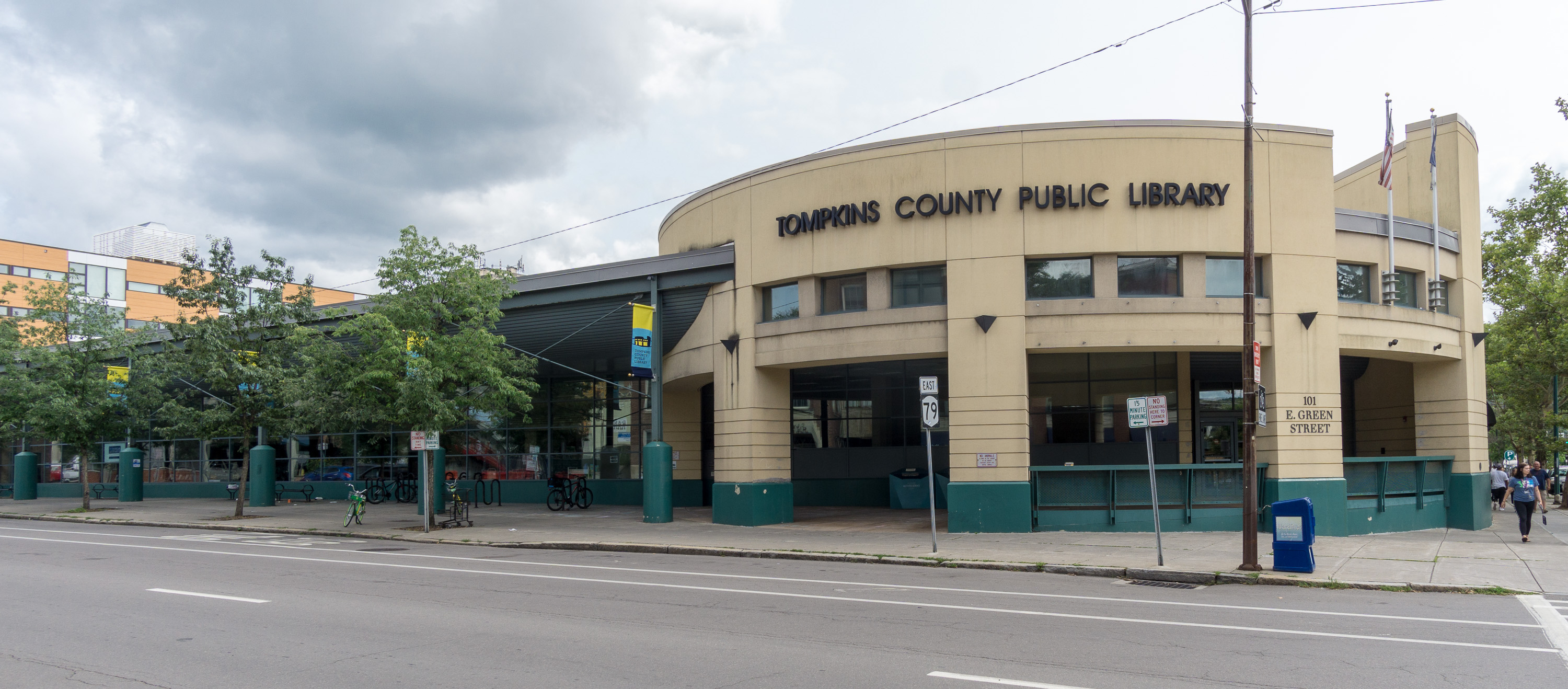
Tompkins County Public Library, 101 East Green St., Ithaca NY

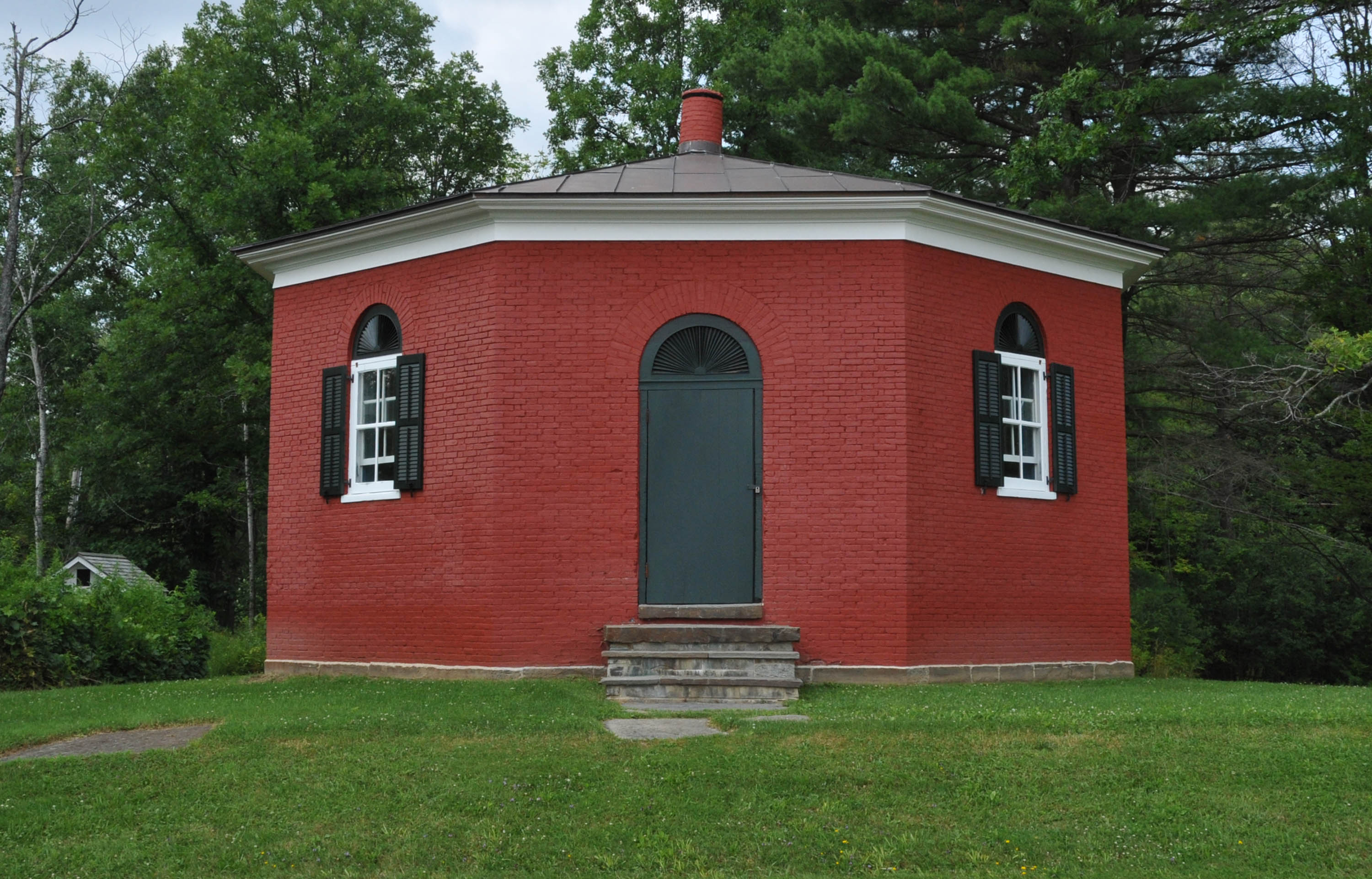
The eight-square schoolhouse or Dryden District School No. 5 is a one room schoolhouse just south of New York Route 13 in Dryden Township.

There are three institutions of higher education in Tompkins County:

- Cornell University in City of Ithaca
- Ithaca College in the Town of Ithaca
- Tompkins-Cortland Community College in the Town of Dryden

The county is served by several school districts: (the largest being Ithaca City School District)

- Candor Central School District
- Cortland City School District
- Dryden Central School District
- Groton Central School District
- Homer Central School District
- Ithaca City School District
- Lansing Central School District
- Newark Valley Central School District
- Newfield Central School District
- Odessa-Montour Central School District
- Southern Cayuga Central School District
- Spencer-Van Etten Central School District
- Trumansburg Central School District

The county is served by several public libraries including the Tompkins County Public Library, the Southworth Library and the Ulysses Philomathic Library.

== See also ==
- List of counties in New York
- National Register of Historic Places listings in Tompkins County, New York
