= Ithaca (town), New York =

Ithaca
- Town
- Town of Ithaca
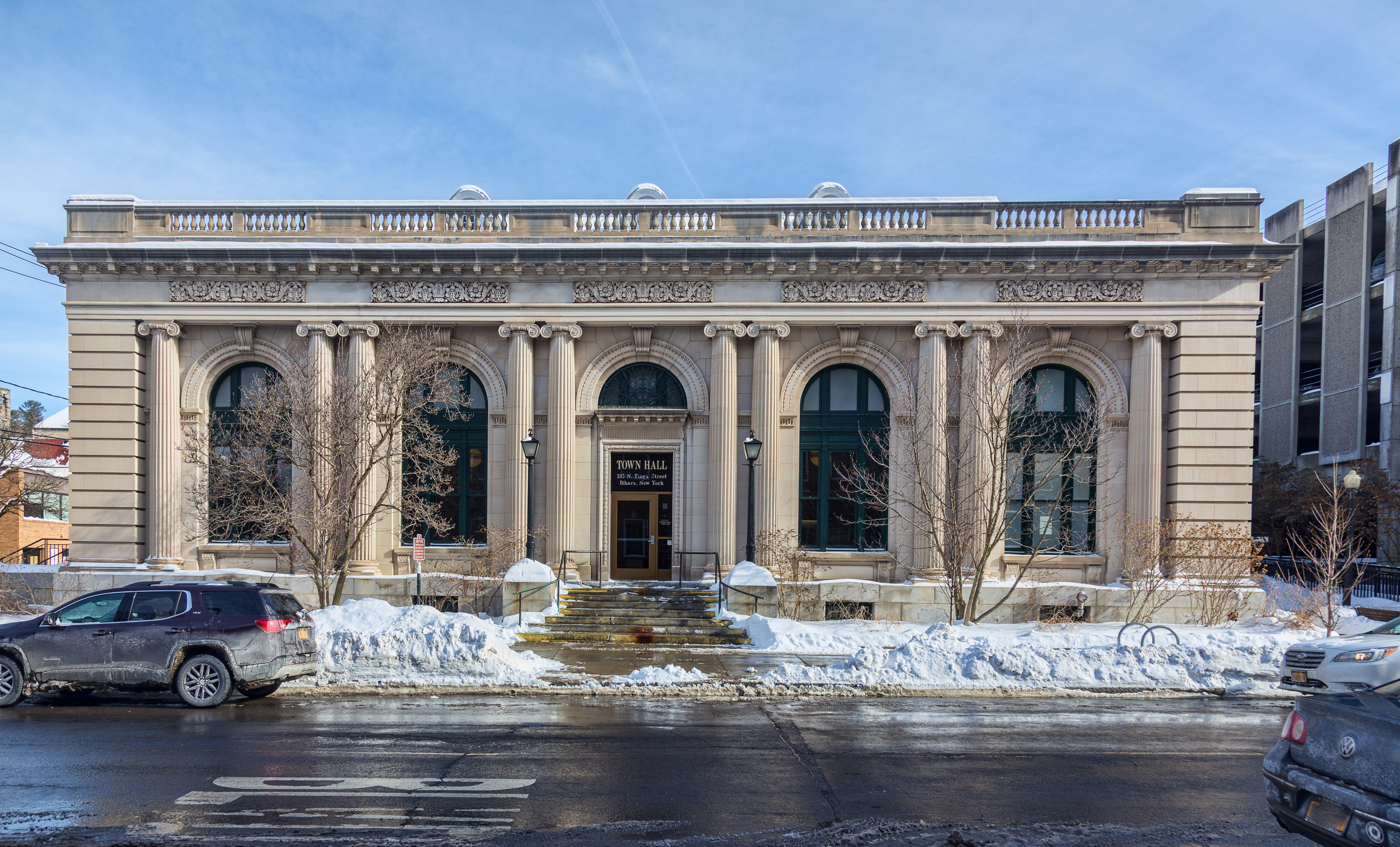
- Ithaca Town Hall, on North Tioga Street.

- Seal

- The Town of Ithaca surrounds but does not include the City of Ithaca

- Location in the contiguous United States Ithaca (New York)
- Coordinates: 42°27′23″N 76°29′35″W
- Country: United States
- State: New York
- County: Tompkins
- Founded: 1821
- Named for: Ithaca

Government
  - Type: Mayor–council
  - Body: Ithaca Town Board
  - Town Supervisor: Eric Levine (D)
  - Ithaca Town Board: Members: • Bill Goodman (D), Supervisor; • Pamela Bleiwas; • Rich DePaolo; • Rod Howe; • Tee-Ann Hunter; • Pat Leary; • Eric Levine (D)

Area
  - Town: 30.29 sq mi (78.5 km^{2})
  - Land: 28.95 sq mi (75.0 km^{2})
  - Water: 1.34 sq mi (3.5 km^{2})
  - Urban: 24.581 sq mi (63.66 km^{2})
  - Metro: 474.649 sq mi (1,229.34 km^{2})
- Elevation: 968 ft (295 m)

Population (2020) †town proper
  - Town: 22,283
  - Density: 707.94/sq mi (273.34/km^{2})
  - Urban: 53,661
  - Urban density: 2,183.0/sq mi (842.87/km^{2})
  - Metro: 101,564
  - Metro density: 213.977/sq mi (82.6170/km^{2})
- Demonym: Ithacan
- Time zone: UTC−5 (EST)
  - Summer (DST): UTC−4 (EDT)
- ZIP codes: 14850, 14851, 14852
- Area code: 607
- FIPS code: 36-38088
- GNIS feature IDs: 979100, 970238
- Website: townithacany.gov

Ithaca is a town in Tompkins County, New York, United States. The town's population was 22,283 at the 2020 census. The town is in the central part of the county, in the Finger Lakes–Southern Tier region of New York, and is part of the Ithaca Metropolitan Statistical Area. The Town of Ithaca is a horseshoe-shaped portion of the metropolitan area of Ithaca, New York, surrounding the City of Ithaca and being the city's only border. Ithaca College is located in the South Hill section of the town.

== History ==
The Sullivan Expedition of 1779 passed through this region. The town is in the former Central New York Military Tract. The Town of Ithaca was created from part of the Town of Ulysses in 1821. In 1865, Ezra Cornell, supported by New York State, provided funds and land to found Cornell University.

== Geography ==
The falls at Buttermilk Falls State Park, located along Rt. 13 in the south part of the Town of Ithaca

According to the United States Census Bureau, the town has a total area of 30.3 square miles (78.5 km^{2}), of which, 29.1 square miles (75.4 km^{2}) of it is land and 1.2 square miles (3.1 km^{2}) of it (3.99%) is water.

The town is at the foot of Cayuga Lake, one of the Finger Lakes. The town borders all other towns in Tompkins County, with the exception of the Towns of Caroline and Groton. It also borders both the eastern and western shores of Cayuga Lake. Fall, Cascadilla, and Six Mile Creeks, the Cayuga Inlet and Buttermilk Creek flow through the town to Cayuga Lake.

Town of Ithaca

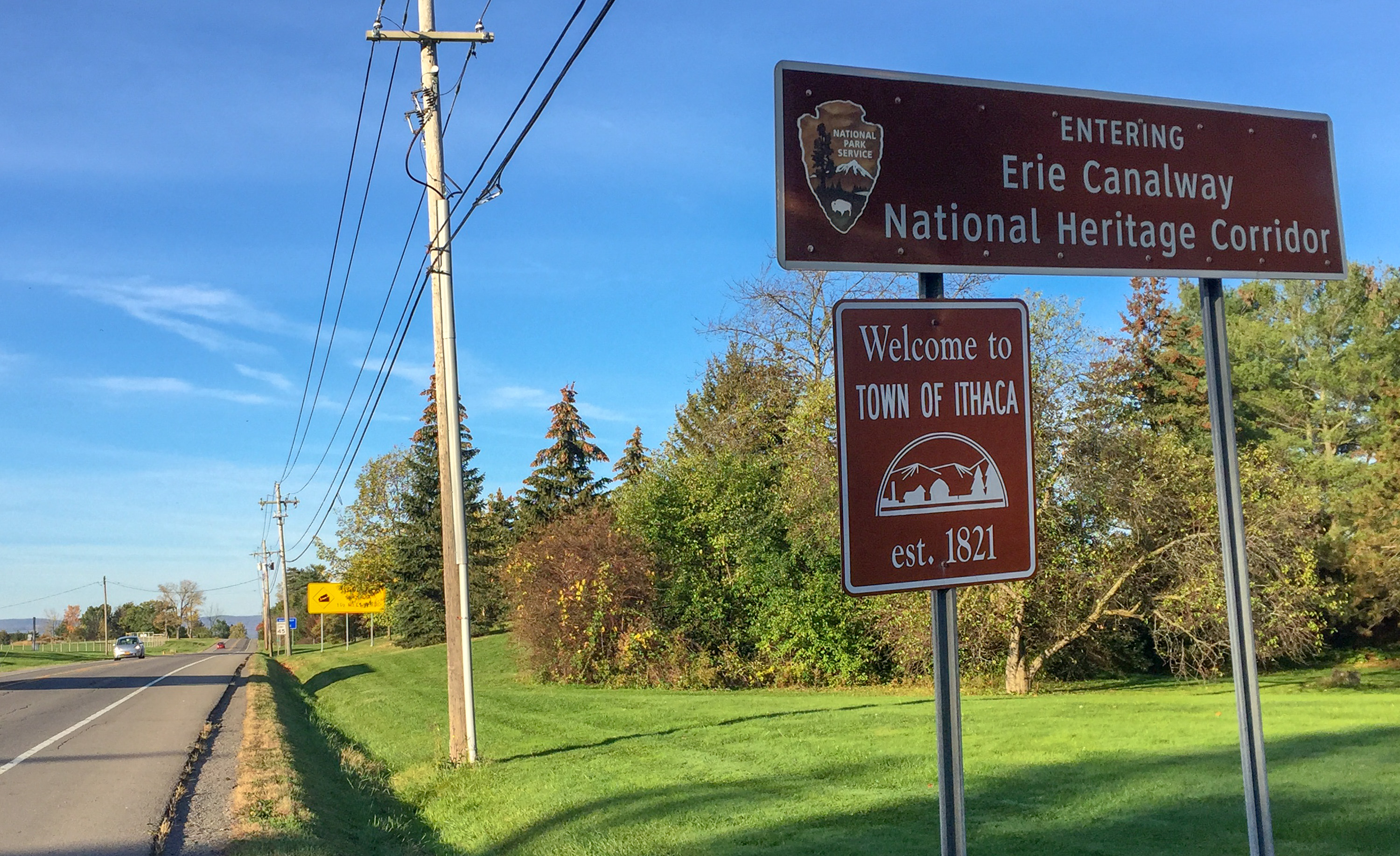
Sign on Dryden Road marks the border of the Town of Ithaca

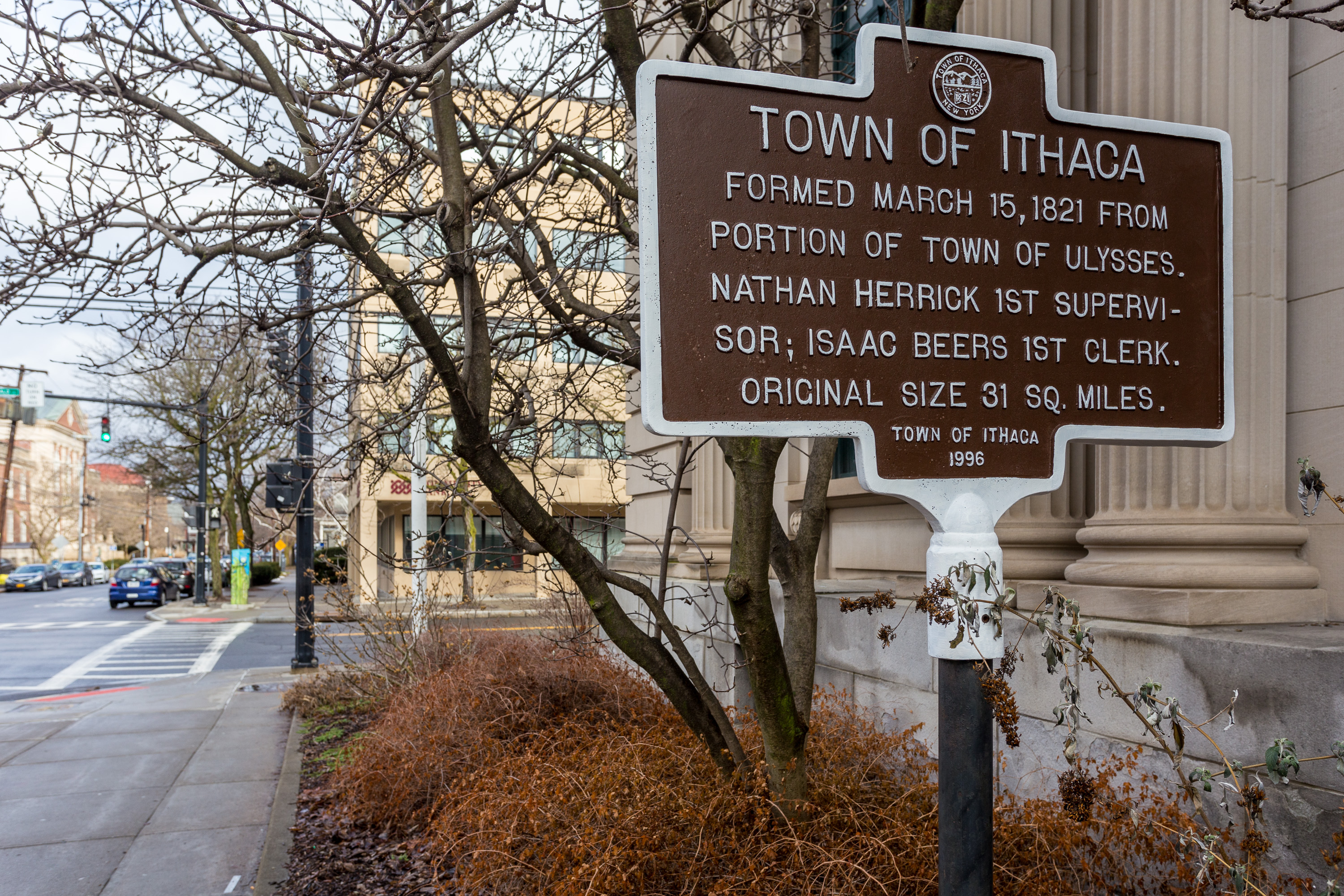
Historic marker in front of the Town Hall (old Post Office) on Tioga Street

The town and the city are at the convergence of several state highways, including: New York State Route 13, New York State Route 34, New York State Route 79, New York State Route 96B, and New York State Route 366.

Ithaca College is in the town, south of the city center. The main campus of Cornell University is located just to the east, partly in the City and partly in the Town.

== Demographics ==
Historical population
Census	Pop.	Note	%±
1830	5,270		—
1840	5,650		7.2%
1850	6,909		22.3%
1860	6,843		−1.0%
1870	10,107		47.7%
1880	11,198		10.8%
1890	1,364		−87.8%
1900	1,516		11.1%
1910	1,288		−15.0%
1920	1,480		14.9%
1930	2,943		98.9%
1940	3,821		29.8%
1950	7,282		90.6%
1960	9,072		24.6%
1970	15,620		72.2%
1980	16,022		2.6%
1990	17,797		11.1%
2000	18,710		5.1%
2010	19,930		6.5%
2020	22,283		11.8%
U.S. Decennial Census

As of the census of 2000, there were 18,198 people, 6,427 households, and 3,399 families residing in the town. The population density was 625.1 inhabitants per square mile (241.4/km^{2}). There were 6,836 housing units at an average density of 234.8 per square mile (90.7/km^{2}). The racial makeup of the town was 84.14% White, 2.93% Black or African American, 0.13% Native American, 9.18% Asian, 0.04% Pacific Islander, 1.38% from other races, and 2.19% from two or more races. Hispanic or Latino of any race were 3.36% of the population.

There were 6,427 households, out of which 24.2% had children under the age of 18 living with them, 45.6% were married couples living together, 5.4% had a female householder with no husband present, and 47.1% were non-families. 32.6% of all households were made up of individuals, and 11.5% had someone living alone who was 65 years of age or older. The average household size was 2.25 and the average family size was 2.83.

In the town, the population was spread out, with 15.1% under the age of 18, 30.1% from 18 to 24, 24.8% from 25 to 44, 17.1% from 45 to 64, and 12.9% who were 65 years of age or older. The median age was 28 years. For every 100 females, there were 90.7 males. For every 100 females age 18 and over, there were 88.1 males.

The median income for a household in the town was $45,281, and the median income for a family was $68,346. Males had a median income of $49,592 versus $30,728 for females. The per capita income for the town was $24,065. About 4.2% of families and 13.2% of the population were below the poverty line, including 3.8% of those under age 18 and 3.0% of those age 65 or over.

== Communities and locations in the Town of Ithaca ==
The City of Ithaca has a completely separate government, and is not part of the town. The two entities form a single community for most practical purposes, for instance, sharing a local school district and many municipal services. Unusual for a local government, many of the town's government offices, including Town Hall, are located within the City of Ithaca, outside of the town's jurisdiction.

- Buttermilk Falls State Park – A state park in the town.
- Cayuga Heights – The Village of Cayuga Heights is north of the City of Ithaca.
- East Cayuga Heights – A hamlet near the northeast town line, east of Cayuga Heights.
- East Ithaca – A census-designated place immediately south of the main campus of Cornell University.
- Forest Home – A hamlet east of the City of Ithaca.
- Hayt Corner – A location in the northwest part of the town.
- Kennedy Corner – A location on the west town line.
- Northeast Ithaca – a census-designated place northeast of the City of Ithaca.
- Northwest Ithaca – a census-designated place northwest of the City of Ithaca
- Renwick – A hamlet north of Ithaca on NY-34.
- Robert H. Treman State Park – A state park in the town.
- South Hill – A hamlet south of the City of Ithaca on NY-96B.
- Whipple Corner – A location on the west town line.

== Government and politics ==
The Town Supervisor of Ithaca is Eric Levine. The Town Board has 6 members who are elected at-large to 4-year terms. In December 2014, the Ithaca Town Board unanimously adopted a resolution recognizing freedom from domestic violence as a fundamental human right.

== See also ==
- List of Registered Historic Places in New York
