= Kurt Riley =

American singer-songwriter (born 1987)

- Born: February 28, 1987 (age 38); Holyoke, Massachusetts, U.S.
- Origin: Memphis, Tennessee
- Genres: Rock and roll, new wave, post-punk, glam rock, art rock, synthpop
- Instruments: Vocals, guitar, harmonica, bass guitar, keyboard, synthesizer, drums, percussion
- Years active: 2005–present
- Website: kurtriley.com

Kurt Riley (born February 28, 1987) is an American rock and roll songwriter, performer, and musician, based in Ithaca, New York.

== Early life ==
Riley was born in Holyoke, Massachusetts. The son of a military father and a homemaker, his family relocated often during his youth, moving to over a dozen locations across the contiguous United States. Upon discovering music while living in Memphis, Tennessee, he became engrossed with early rock and roll and blues, especially the works of Bo Diddley, Jimmy Reed, Chuck Berry, and Muddy Waters. During this time, he began honing his instrumental and compositional skills, teaching himself to play harmonica, guitar, and several other instruments. Later, after moving to Florida, he formed a rhythm and blues group called The Steel Hearts, covering artists such as Larry Williams, the Clash, Eddie Cochran, and Otis Redding. After eighteen months of live performances across South Florida (including a concert at Palm Beach State College), The Steel Hearts disbanded.

== Brighthead ==
Subsequently, Riley began recording and performing as a solo artist; his first album, Brighthead, was recorded and released independently. Beginning a recurring tradition, Riley designed a custom stage outfit and makeup design for the album. This first costume was called the "Brightsuit."

Riley organized a live band and began performing in South Florida, but this series of live performances were cut short by what Riley called "unforeseen circumstances."

== Kismet ==
During a subsequent hiatus, Riley returned to Memphis, and graduated from Southwest Tennessee Community College. Subsequently, he completed his baccalaureate work at Cornell University in Ithaca, New York, where he continued his musical career. His sophomore record, the sci-fi concept album Kismet, was produced on Cornell's campus and released to acclaim from Ithaca media, including WVBR, The Ithaca Times, and The Cornell Daily Sun.

Featuring an elaborate plot concerning alien royalty and the future of humanity, Kismet was released through Electric Buffalo Records, an independent record label started by Cornell students. Continuing Riley's DIY ethic, the music videos for Kismet's singles, "Hush Hush Hush" and "Whore," were shot in the Ithaca Commons. Riley's fascination with science fiction and disparate musical genres were key influences: "I recalled MTV. Bruce Springsteen. Phil Collins. Soft synthpads and rocking guitar anthems. The last decade where it was acceptable for music to be joyful in that naïve old way, before cynicism became de rigueur. That New Wave energy was a true inspiration for Kismet - just as much as the work of ILM, James Horner, and Drew Struzan." The Ithaca Journal ranked Kismet one of the best local albums of 2016, and named Riley as one of the top local live performers of the year.

== Tabula Rasa ==
"Tabula Rasa turns to the spectacle and ennui of current technology, evidenced in trends like the 24-hour news cycles and slacktivism...Riley's music is more often focused on joy and memory, and Riley and his band consistently knock it out of the park with action-packed arrangements and pristine technical chops."

— The Cornell Daily Sun, April 30, 2017.

Upon graduating from Cornell, Riley remained in Ithaca, where he continues his musical career. The recording of his third studio album, Tabula Rasa, was funded in part by a grant from the Community Arts Partnership of Tompkins County, New York. Upon its release, Tabula Rasa was well-received by The Cornell Daily Sun, WRFI, and The Ithaca Times. Subsequently, Riley and his band performed at Cornell's Willard Straight Hall and several Ithaca venues in support of the album.

== 2018 singles ==
In February 2018, Riley released the single Love Is In My Heart, produced by Grammy Award-winning engineer Will Russell. Subsequently, Magic Tramps and Alan Vega drummer Sesu Coleman joined Riley's band in June of that year, alongside longtime stalwarts Rick Kline (bass/bass synthesizer) and Charlie Jones (synthesizer/keyboards). The band finished 2018 with the release of the upbeat single Be Cool, the final entry in his first artistic phase.

== Chrome Empire ==
2019 saw the start of a new stylistic and musical period, which Riley calls Chrome Empire, described as “if the Rolling Stones had gotten their start as a bar band in the world of ‘Blade Runner.’” As part of the ongoing Chrome Empire concept album, Riley has released the singles FTR SHK, Say You Love Me, Evergreen, and Free. Contemporaneously, he collaborated with indie/synth artist Orange Julians under the name the beforetimes, releasing the single time machine.

== Discography ==
- Brighthead (2010)
- Kismet (2016)
- Tabula Rasa (2017)

=== Singles ===
- "Love Is In My Heart" (2018)
- "Failure of Imagination" (2018)
- "Be Cool" (2018)
- "FTR SHK" (2019)
- "Say You Love Me" (2020)
- "Evergreen" (2020)
- "time machine" (2020)
- "Free" (2020)
