= Ithaca, New York =

- City
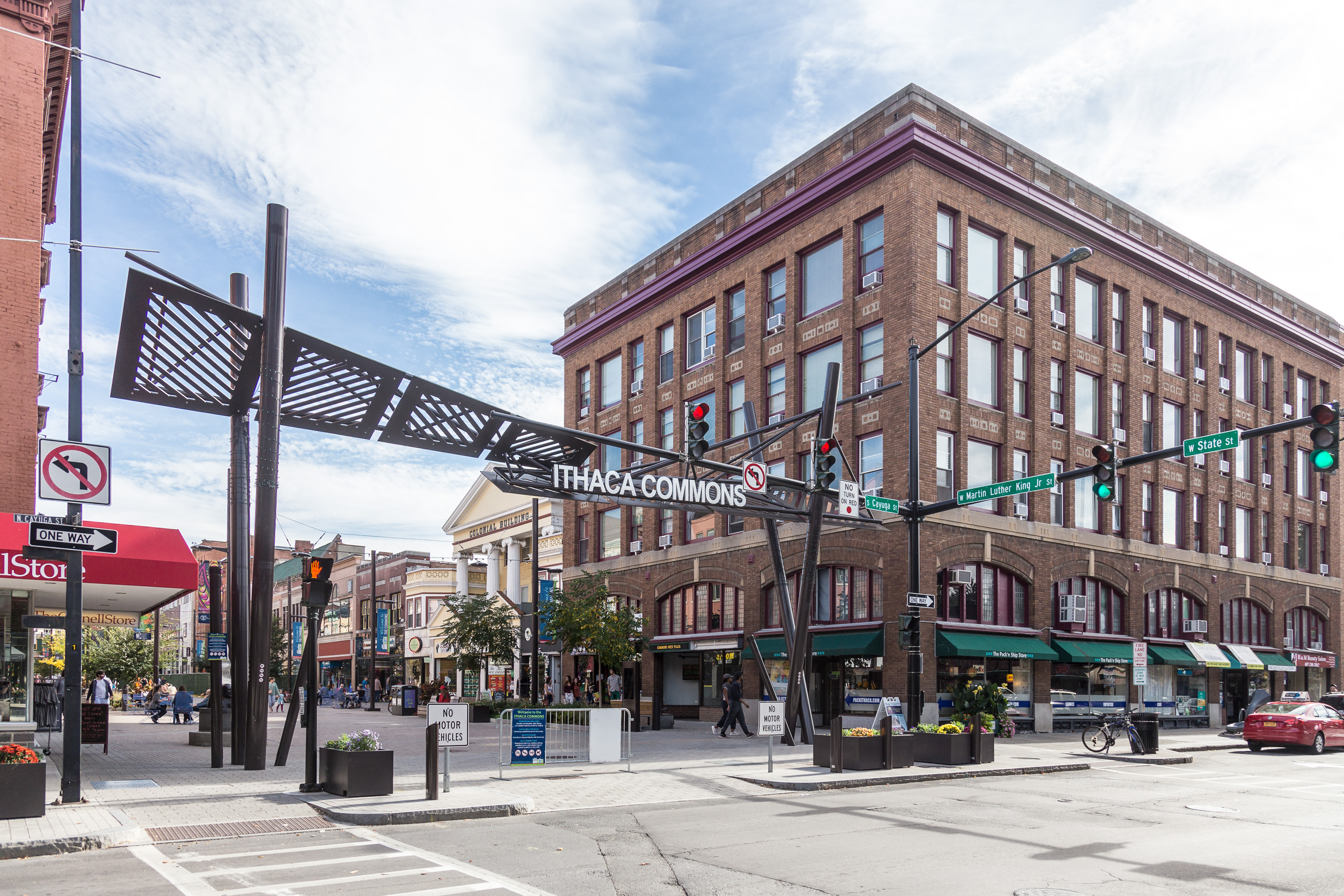
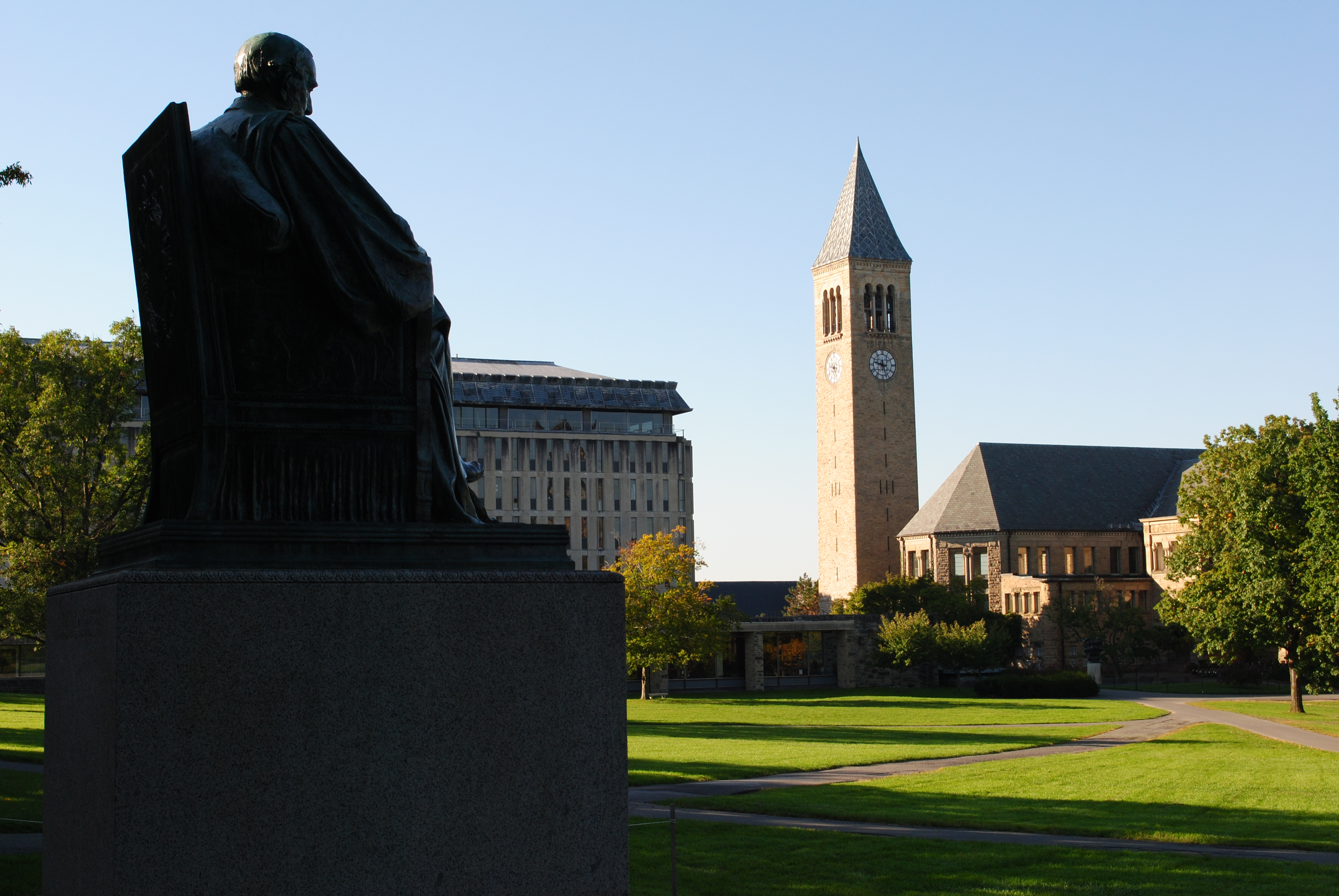
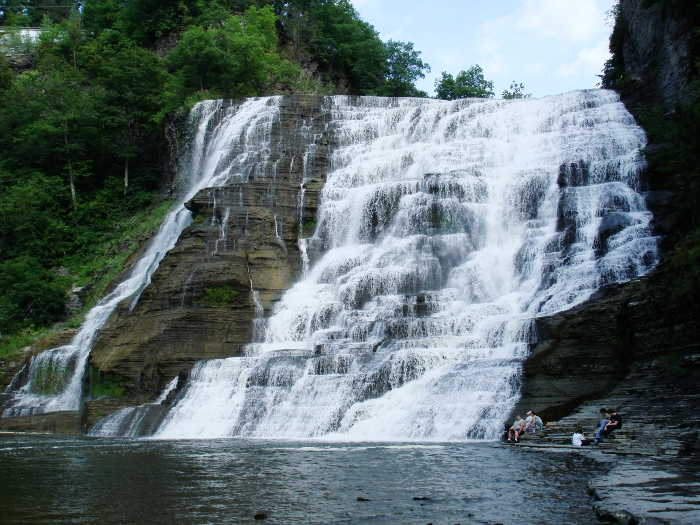
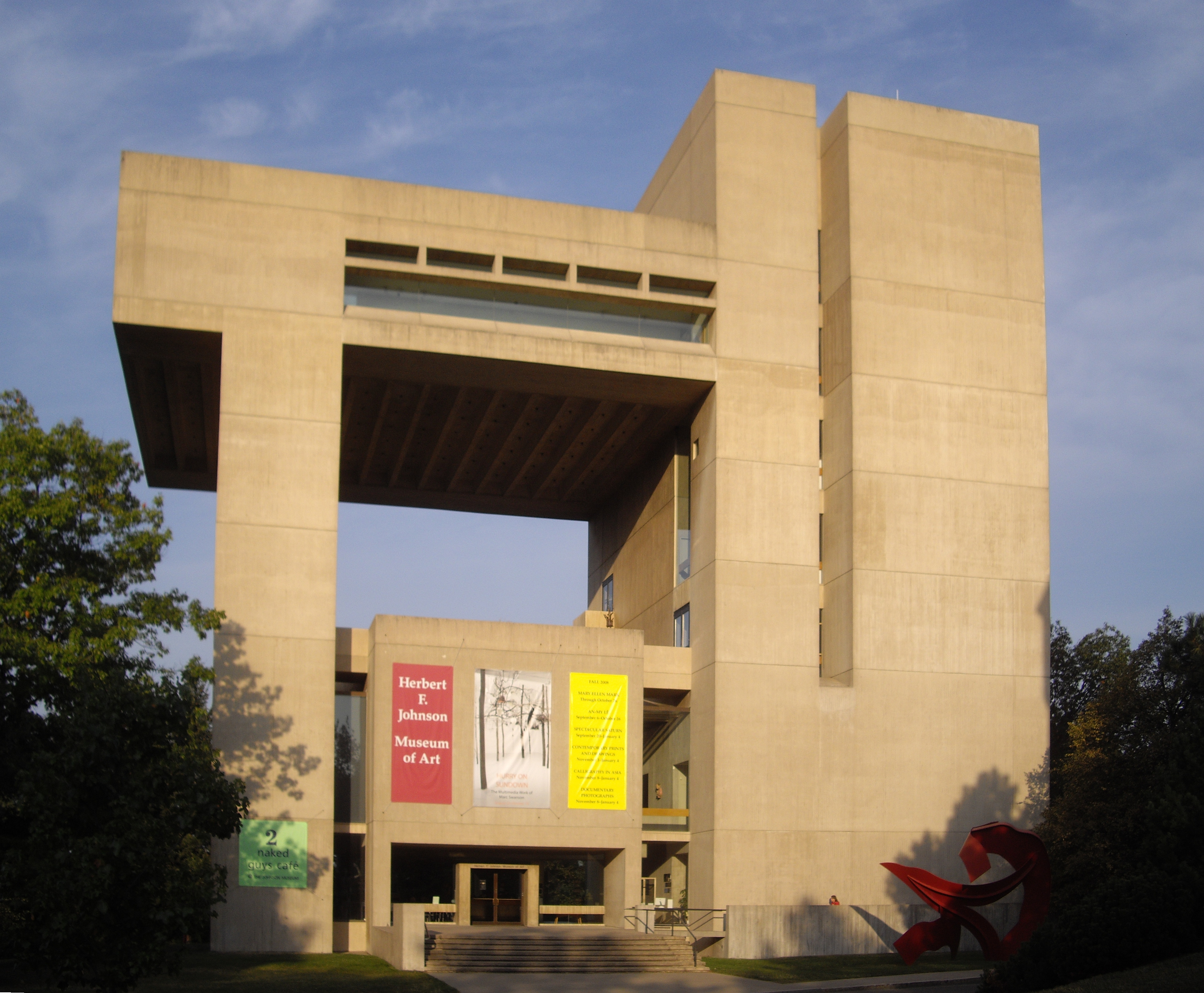
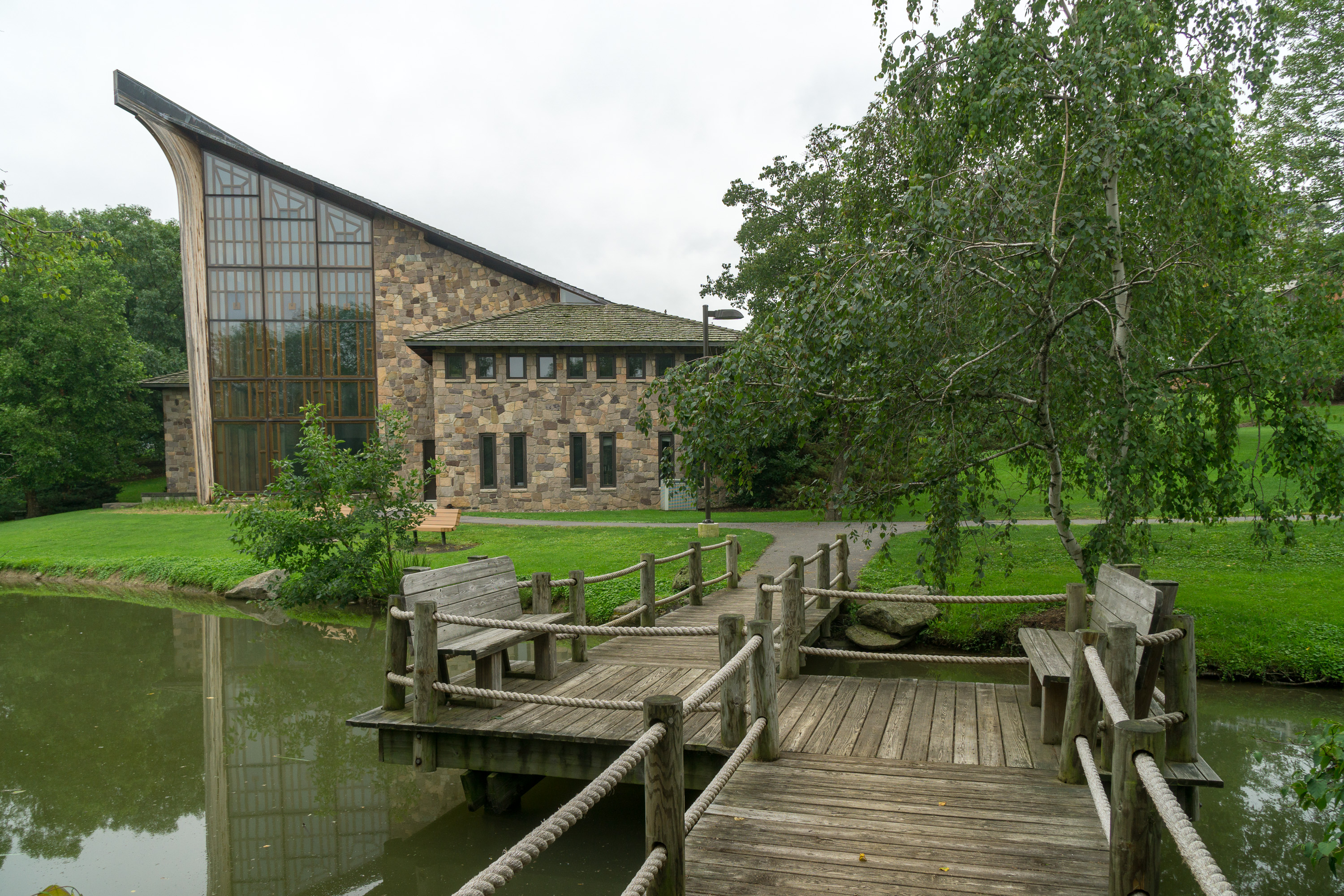
- Ithaca Commons Cornell University Ithaca Falls Herbert F. Johnson Museum of Art Ithaca College

- Seal

- Location within New York Location within the United States
- Coordinates: 42°26′36″N 76°30′0″W
- Country: United States
- State: New York
- County: Tompkins
- Founded: 1790; 236 years ago
- Incorporated: 1888; 138 years ago
- Named for: Ithaca, Greece

Government
  - Type: Council–manager
  - Body: Common Council
  - Mayor: Robert Cantelmo (D)

Area
  - City: 6.07 sq mi (15.72 km^{2})
  - Land: 5.39 sq mi (13.96 km^{2})
  - Water: 0.68 sq mi (1.77 km^{2})
  - Urban: 24.581 sq mi (63.66 km^{2})
  - Metro: 474.649 sq mi (1,229.34 km^{2})
- Elevation: 404 ft (123 m)

Population (2020)
  - City: 32,108
  - Estimate (2024): 33,768
  - Density: 5,958.2/sq mi (2,300.47/km^{2})
  - Urban: 53,661
  - Urban density: 2,183.0/sq mi (842.87/km^{2})
  - Metro: 105,740
  - Metro density: 222.78/sq mi (86.014/km^{2})
- Demonym: Ithacan
- Time zone: UTC−5 (EST)
  - Summer (DST): UTC−4 (EDT)
- ZIP Codes: 14850, 14851, 14852, and 14853
- Area code: 607
- FIPS code: 36-38077
- GNIS feature IDs: 970238, 979099
- Website: cityofithaca.org

Ithaca (/ˈɪθəkə/) is a city in the U.S. state of New York. It is situated on the southern shore of Cayuga Lake in the Finger Lakes region of Upstate New York. With a population of 32,108 as of the 2020 census, Ithaca is the largest community in the Ithaca metropolitan statistical area, which includes all 103,558 residents of Tompkins County, of which it is the county seat. The city is named after the Greek island of Ithaca, home of the protagonist Odysseus in Homer's Odyssey.

Ithaca is a college town best known for hosting Cornell University, an Ivy League university founded in 1865, as well as Ithaca College. Until the late 18th century, present-day Ithaca was inhabited by the Cayuga people of the Haudenosaunee (Iroquois) Confederacy. In 1789, the federal and state governments began granting land in the area, known as the Central New York Military Tract, to compensate veterans of the American Revolutionary War. Located in the township of Ulysses, or Tract 22, Ithaca was populated by white settlers in 1794 and formally established in 1821.

== History ==
=== 17th century ===
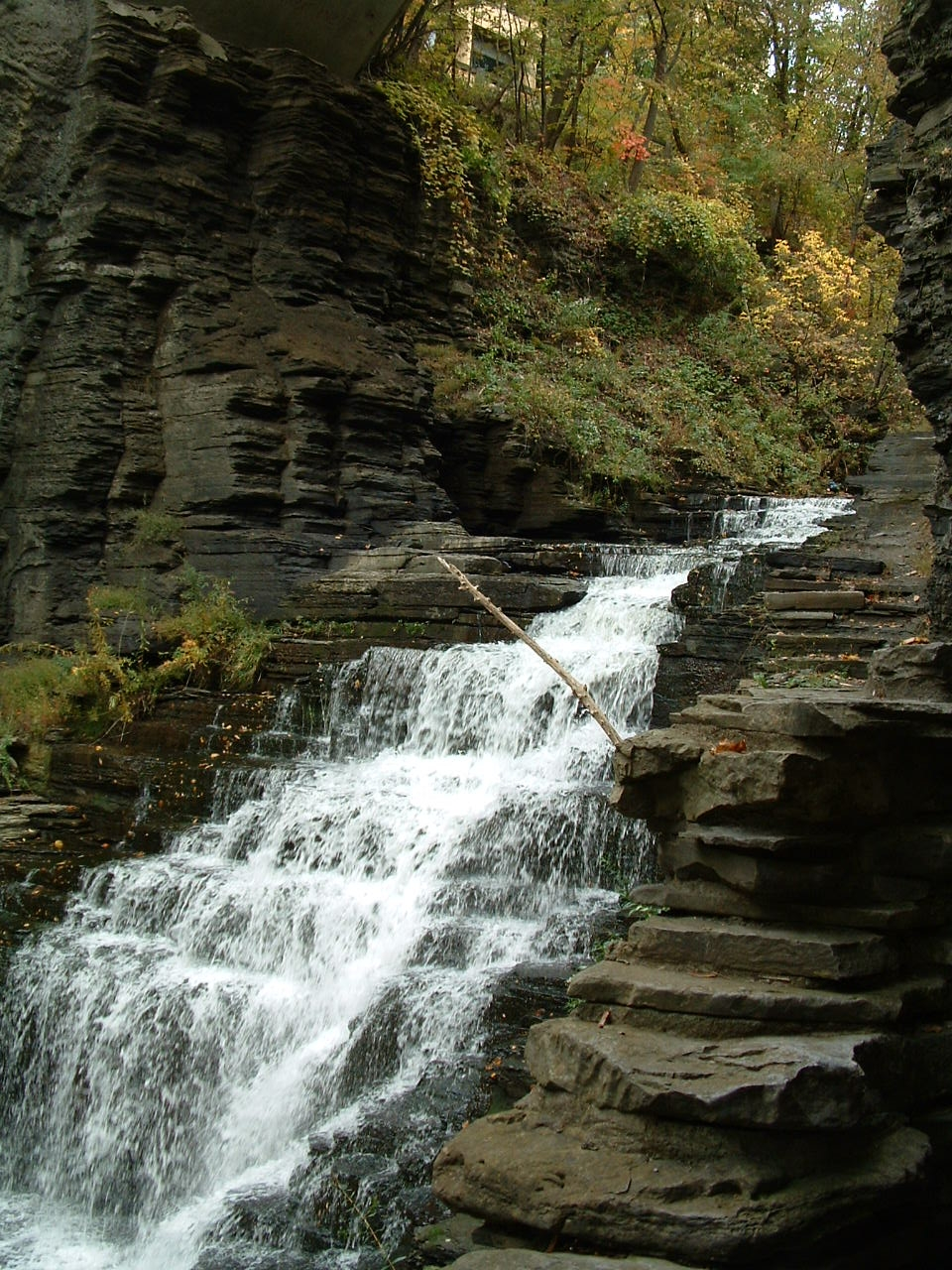
Cascadilla Creek gorge

An 1882 perspective map of Ithaca

Native Americans lived in this area for thousands of years. When reached by Europeans, this area was controlled by the Cayuga (Gayogo̱hó꞉nǫʼ), one of the five tribes comprising the Iroquois Confederacy (Haudenosaunee). Jesuit missionaries from New France in present-day Quebec had a mission to convert the Cayuga as early as 1657.

=== 18th century ===
Saponi and Tutelo peoples joined the Haudenosaunee Confederacy and moved to lands at the south end of Cayuga Lake. As League members under the Cayuga, they settled on the tribe's hunting lands at the south end of Cayuga Lake, and in Pony (originally Sapony) Hollow of present-day Newfield, New York and Cayuta, New York. These tribes had been forced from Virginia and North Carolina by warfare with European colonial settlement and other native tribes. Similarly, the Tuscarora people, an Iroquoian-speaking tribe from the Carolinas, migrated after defeat in the Yamasee War; they settled with the Oneida people and became the sixth nation of the Haudenosaunee, with chiefs stating the migration was complete in 1722.

During the American Revolutionary War, four of the then six Iroquois nations helped the British attempt to crush the revolution, although each nation made decisions on fighting in a highly decentralized way. Conflict with the rebel colonists was fierce throughout the Mohawk Valley and Western New York. In retaliation for conflicts to the east and resentment at the way in which the Iroquois made war, the 1779 Sullivan Expedition was conducted against the Iroquois in the west of the state, destroying more than 40 villages and stored winter crops and forcing their retreat from the area. It destroyed the Tutelo village of Coreorgonel, located near what is now the junction of state routes 13 and 13A just south of Ithaca. Most Iroquois were forced from the state after the Revolutionary War, but some remnants remained. The state sold off the former Iroquois lands to stimulate development and settlement by non-indigenous Americans; lands were also granted as payment to veterans of the war.

Within the current boundaries of Ithaca, Native Americans maintained a temporary hunting camp at the base of Cascadilla Gorge. In 1788, eleven men from Kingston, New York, came to the area with two Lenape guides, to explore what they considered wilderness. The following year Jacob Yaple, Isaac Dumond, and Peter Hinepaw returned with their families and constructed log cabins. That same year Abraham Bloodgood of Albany obtained a patent from the state for 1,400 acres, which included all of the present downtown west of Tioga Street.

In 1790, the federal government and state began an official program to grant land in the area, known as the Central New York Military Tract, as payment for service to Continental Army soldiers of the Revolutionary War, when the newly established federal government was cash poor. Most local land titles trace back to these Revolutionary war grants. However, the Bloodgood tract was not part of the state bounties to veterans. It was originally granted to a member of the state militia, Martinus Zielie, as a bounty under a different law for recruiting men to enlist in the Continental Army.

As part of this process, the Central New York Military Tract, which included northern Tompkins County, was surveyed under the direction of Simeon De Witt, Bloodgood's son-in-law and the Surveyor General of New York. Simeon commissioned his first cousin, Moses De Witt, after whom DeWitt, New York, is named, to survey the area around the south end of Cayuga Lake. Both Simeon and Moses were first cousins of DeWitt Clinton through his mother, Mary De Witt, who married James Clinton, brother of Governor George Clinton. The Commissioners of Lands of New York State (chairman Gov. George Clinton) met in 1790. The Military Tract township in which Ithaca is located was named the Town of Ulysses. A few years later De Witt moved to Ithaca, then called variously "The Flats," "The City," or "Sodom"; he (or his clerk, Robert Harpur) renamed it for the Greek island home of Ulysses in the spirit of the multitude of settlement names in the region derived from classical literature, such as Aurelius, Ovid, Troy, and especially of Ulysses, New York, the town that contained Ithaca at the time.

Around 1791, De Witt surveyed what is now the downtown area into lots and sold them at modest prices. That same year John Yaple built a grist mill on Cascadilla Creek.

On November 11, 1794, the Treaty of Canandaigua was ratified between approximately 50 Sachems and leaders of the Iroquois and Timothy Pickering on behalf of President George Washington and the United States of America. Among the treaty's numerous provisions, the Cayuga agreed to officially cede their right to all land in present-day Tompkins County in exchange for an approximately 64,000 acre reservation at the north end of Cayuga Lake. Today, the Cayuga Nation of New York, the Cayuga signatories' ancestors, still point to the Treaty of Canandaigua as evidence of their legal sovereignty.

Ithaca's first frame house was erected in 1800 by Abram Markle. In 1804, the village had a postmaster and, in 1805, a tavern.

=== 19th century ===
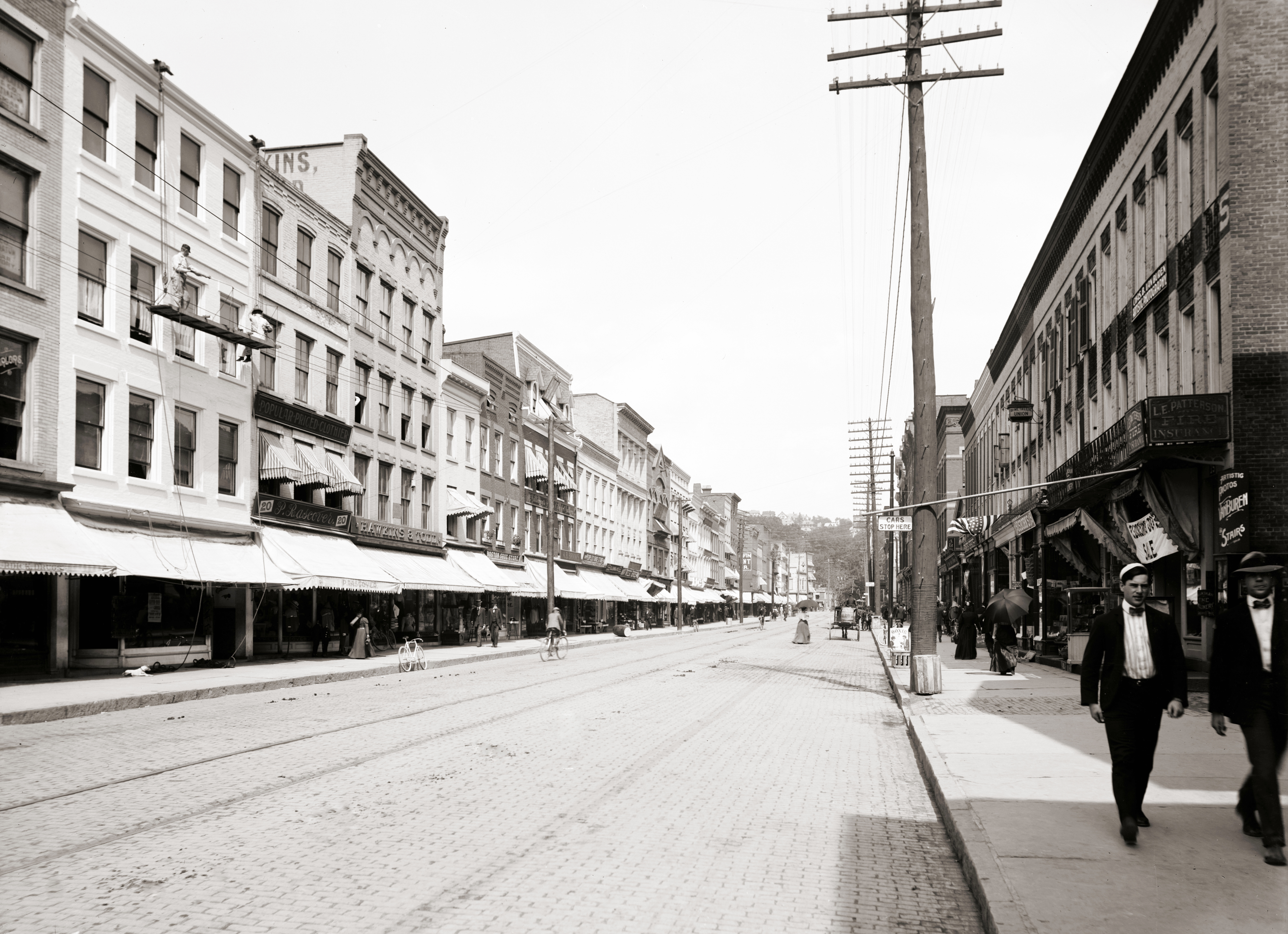
State Street in Ithaca, c. 1901

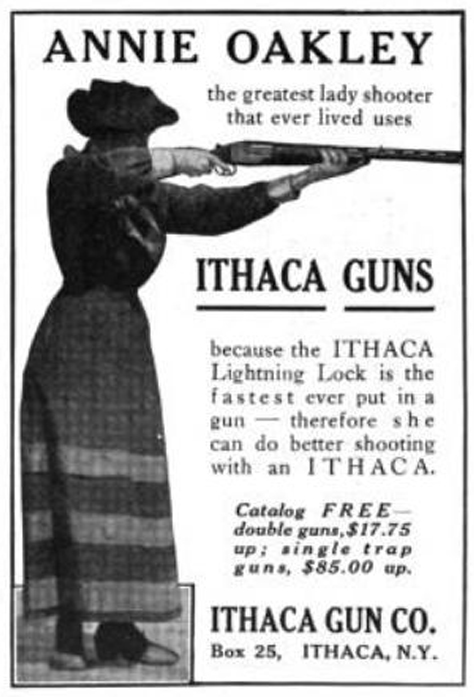
Ithaca Gun Company's Annie Oakley gun in 1916

Ithaca became a transshipping point for salt from curing beds near Salina, New York, to buyers south and east. This prompted construction in 1810 of the Owego Turnpike. When the War of 1812 cut off access to gypsum in Nova Scotia, which was used for fertilizer, Ithaca became the center of trade in Cayuga gypsum. The Cayuga Steamboat Company was organized in 1819 and, in 1820, launched the first steamboat on Cayuga Lake, the Enterprise. In 1821, the village was incorporated at the same time the Town of Ithaca was organized and separated from the parent Town of Ulysses. In 1834, the Ithaca and Owego Railroad's first horse drawn train began service, connecting traffic on the east–west Erie Canal, which was completed in 1825, with the Susquehanna River to the south to expand the trade network.

With the Long Depression of 1837, the Ithaca and Owego Railroad was re-organized as the Cayuga and Susquehanna Railroad. It was re-engineered with switchbacks downhill into Ithaca in the late 1840s. In the late 20th century, a short section of its abandoned right-of-way in the City and Town of Ithaca was used for the South Hill Recreation Way.

However, easier early railroad routes were constructed that bypassed Ithaca, such as that of the Syracuse, Binghamton & New York, built in 1854. In the decade following the American Civil War, railroads were built from Ithaca to Auburn, Geneva, Cayuga, Cortland, Elmira, and Athens, Pennsylvania, mainly with financing from Ezra Cornell. These were all branch-lines, since the city, located on a steep hill by the lake, prevented it from being directly connected to a major transportation artery.

In 1892, when the Bethlehem, Pennsylvania-based Lehigh Valley Railroad built its main, double-track freight line from Van Etten Junction to Geneva and on to Buffalo, New York, it bypassed Ithaca and Auburn to the west, running via Burdett and eastern Schuyler County on easier grades, just as the Delaware, Lackawanna and Western Railroad had done a decade earlier, in 1882, with its own, new Binghamton-Buffalo mainline extension to the south and west, via Owego, Waverly, Bath, and Dansville. Two of three daily New York City-Buffalo roundtrip passenger trains served Ithaca on the older, original Lehigh Valley Ithaca Branch between Van Etten Junction and Geneva, until discontinuance of the Black Diamond daylight train, on May 11, 1959. On May 25, 1959, the overnight "Maple Leaf" train was shifted back to the Ithaca Branch from the main line via Burdett, and operated on this route until the Lehigh Valley Railroad discontinued this last passenger service on February 4, 1961.

In the late 19th century, more industry developed in Ithaca. In 1883, William Henry Baker and his partners founded the Ithaca Gun Company, which manufactured shotguns. The original factory was located in the Fall Creek neighborhood of the city, on a slope later known as Gun Hill, where the nearby waterfall supplied the main source of energy for the plant. The company became an icon in the hunting and shooting world, and its shotguns were known for their fine decorative work. Wooden gunstocks with knots or other imperfections were donated to the high school woodworking shop to be made into lamps. John Philip Sousa and trick-shooter Annie Oakley favored Ithaca Gun Company guns. In 1937, the company began producing the Ithaca 37, based on a 1915 patent by noted firearms designer John Browning. Its 12-gauge shotguns were the standard used for decades by the New York City Police Department and Los Angeles Police Department.

In 1885, Ithaca Children's Home was established on West Seneca Street. The orphanage had two programs at the time: a residential home for both orphaned and destitute children, and a day nursery. The village established its first trolley in 1887. Ithaca developed as a small manufacturing and retail center and was incorporated as a city in 1888. The largest industrial company in the area was Morse Chain, elements of which were absorbed into Emerson Power Transmission on South Hill and Borg Warner Automotive in Lansing, New York.

Ithaca claims to be the birthplace of the ice cream sundae, created in 1892 when fountain shop owner Chester Platt "served his local priest vanilla ice cream covered in cherry syrup with a dark candied cherry on top. The priest suggested the dessert be named after the day, Sunday, although the spelling was later changed out of fear some would find it offensive." The local Unitarian church, where the priest, Rev. John Scott, preached, has an annual "Sundae Sunday" every September in commemoration. Ithaca's claim has long been disputed by Two Rivers, Wisconsin. Also in 1892, the Ithaca Kitty became one of the first mass-produced stuffed animal toys in the United States.

=== 20th century ===
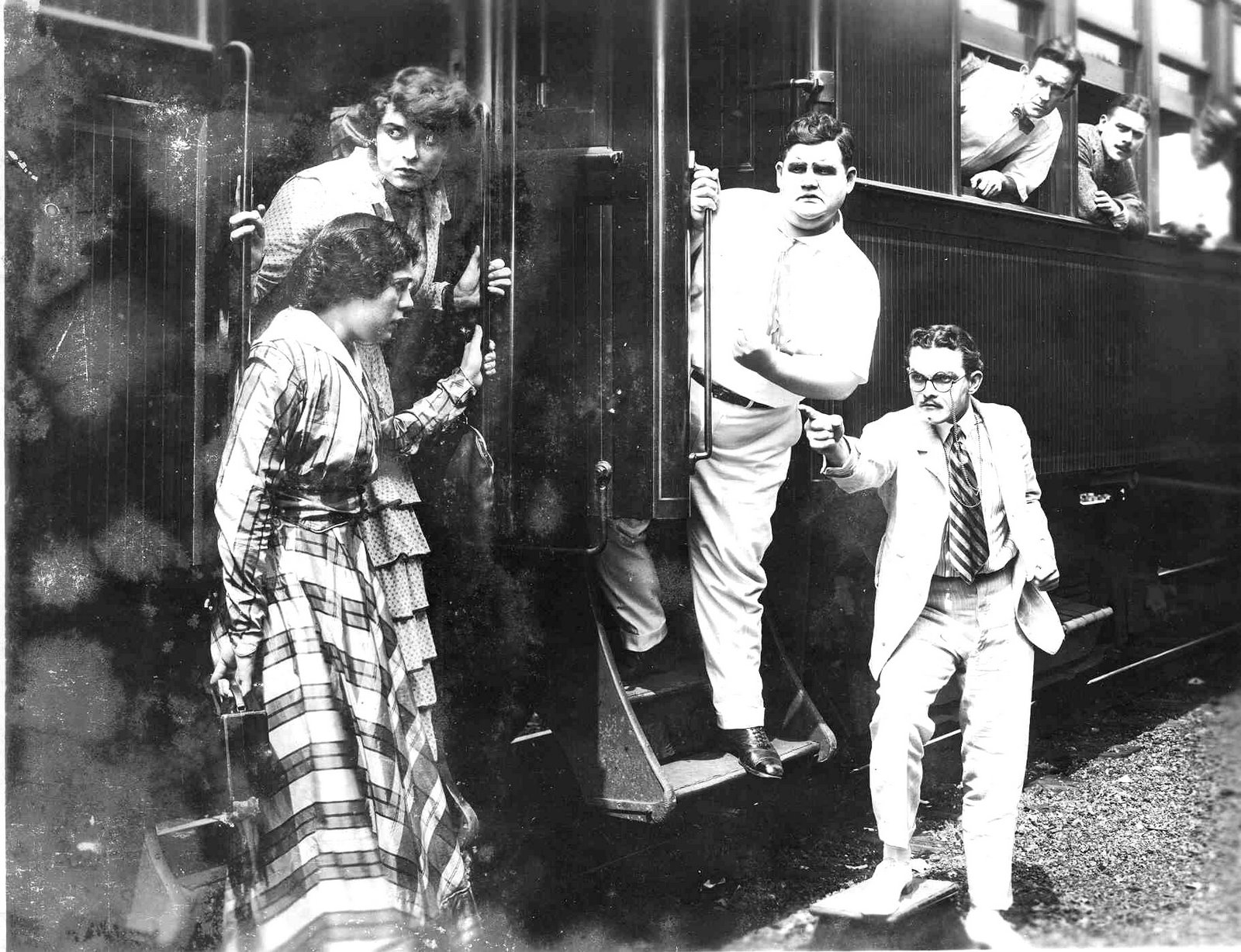
The New Adventures of J. Rufus Wallingford, a Wharton Studio production still

In 1900, Cornell University anatomy professor G. S. Moler made an early movie using frame-by-frame technology. For The Skeleton Dance, he took single-frame photos of a human skeleton in varying positions, giving the illusion of a dancing skeleton. During the early 20th century, Ithaca was an important center in the silent film industry. These films often featured the local natural scenery. Many of these films were the work of Leopold Wharton and his brother Theodore; The Wharton Studio was on the site of what is now Stewart Park.

In 1903, a typhoid epidemic resulting from poor sanitation infrastructure devastated the city. Not having access to unpolluted water was one suspicion to the cause of the outbreak because "[r]efuse and the contents of the early sewer system dumped directly into the inlet". One out of ten citizens fell ill or died. Local residents lost fifty-one people to the illness that year, but there was "an average of thirty-nine cases each year" for the consecutive ten years following.

The Star Theatre on East Seneca Street was built in 1911 and became the most popular vaudeville venue in the region. Wharton movies were also filmed and shown there. After the film industry centralized in Hollywood, production in Ithaca effectively ceased. Few of the silent films made in Ithaca have been preserved.

Ithaca had film studio activity during the silent film era including Wharton Studio.

After World War II, the Langmuir Research Labs of General Electric developed as a major employer; the defense industry continued to expand. GE's headquarters were in Schenectady, New York, to the northeast in the Mohawk Valley.

Although Ithaca has a history of Ku Klux Klan activity, including a cross-burning in 1923 and 1924, "the peak years of Klan activity in Ithaca were 1923-1925" and it represented only a fraction of the population. Ithaca is known for its political activism regarding civil rights and environmental issues. "Martin Luther King Jr. came to speak twice in Ithaca, in 1960 and 1961". The annual Ithaca Festival, which often takes place on the Ithaca Commons or Stewart Park, frequently centers around themes promoting "a political statement into a cultural and festive event"

The first African-American elected to the Common Council was Jerome Holland in 1967. Holland represented the Second Ward from 1968 to 1972.

=== 21st century ===
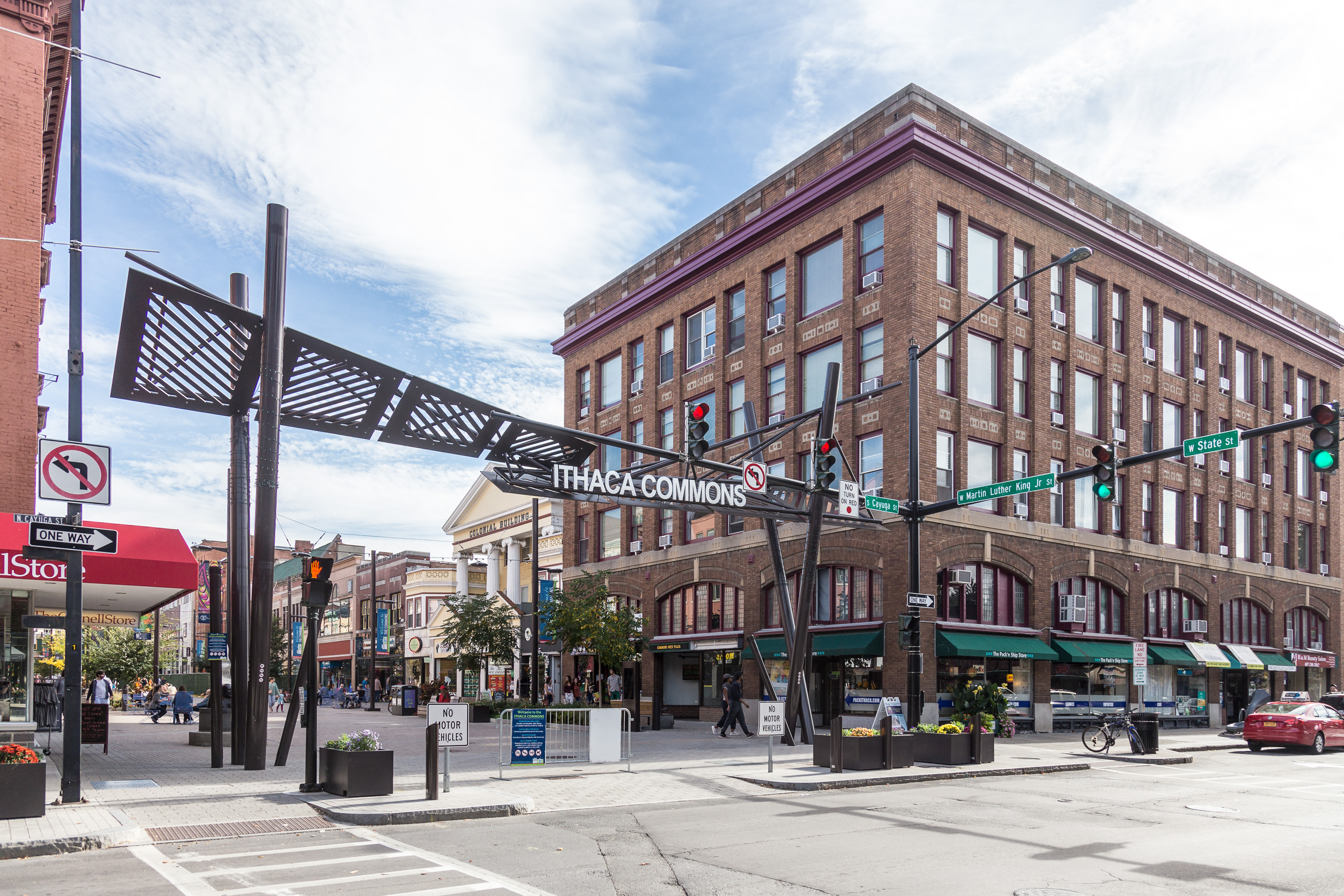
The west entrance to Ithaca Commons at Cayuga Street

The Ithaca Gun Company tested their shotguns behind the plant on Lake Street; the shot fell into the Fall Creek gorge at the base of Ithaca Falls. Lead accumulated in the soil in and around the factory and gorge. A major lead clean-up effort sponsored by the United States Superfund took place from 2002 to 2004, managed through the Environmental Protection Agency. The old Ithaca Gun building has been dismantled, though its iconic smokestack remains standing. It was scheduled to be replaced by the development of an apartment complex on the cleaned land.

The former Morse Chain company factory on South Hill, now owned by Emerson Power Transmission, was the site of extensive groundwater and soil contamination from its industrial operations. Emerson Power Transmission has been working with the state and South Hill residents to determine the extent and danger of the contamination and aid in cleanup. In 2026, New York State awarded the project $38 million to facilitate redevelopment efforts.

In 2004, Gayraud Townsend, a 20-year-old senior in Cornell's School of Industrial and Labor Relations, was sworn in as alderman of the city council: the youngest African American to be elected to office in the United States. He served his full term and has mentored other student politicians. In 2011, Svante Myrick, a 2009 Cornell University graduate, was elected as the youngest mayor of the city of Ithaca. Myrick resigned in February 2022 to serve as executive director of People for the American Way.

In 2023, President of the Cornell Student Assembly Patrick Kuehl launched a secret write-in campaign and succeeded in unseating Alderperson Jorge Defendini, another Cornell alumnus, from the Ithaca Common Council. Kuehl had collaborated with fellow students Alderperson Tiffany Kumar and canvassed for several weeks but did not publicly express his intent to run for the seat until the evening of election day. Kuehl received an inordinate number of provisional ballots and absentee ballots from residents of the Sigma Phi and Delta Kappa Epsilon fraternity houses. Various Ithaca and Cornell groups condemned the secret campaign as undemocratic.

The incumbent mayor is Robert Cantelmo who took office on January 1, 2024. Dominick Recckio serves as the acting city manager.

== Geography ==
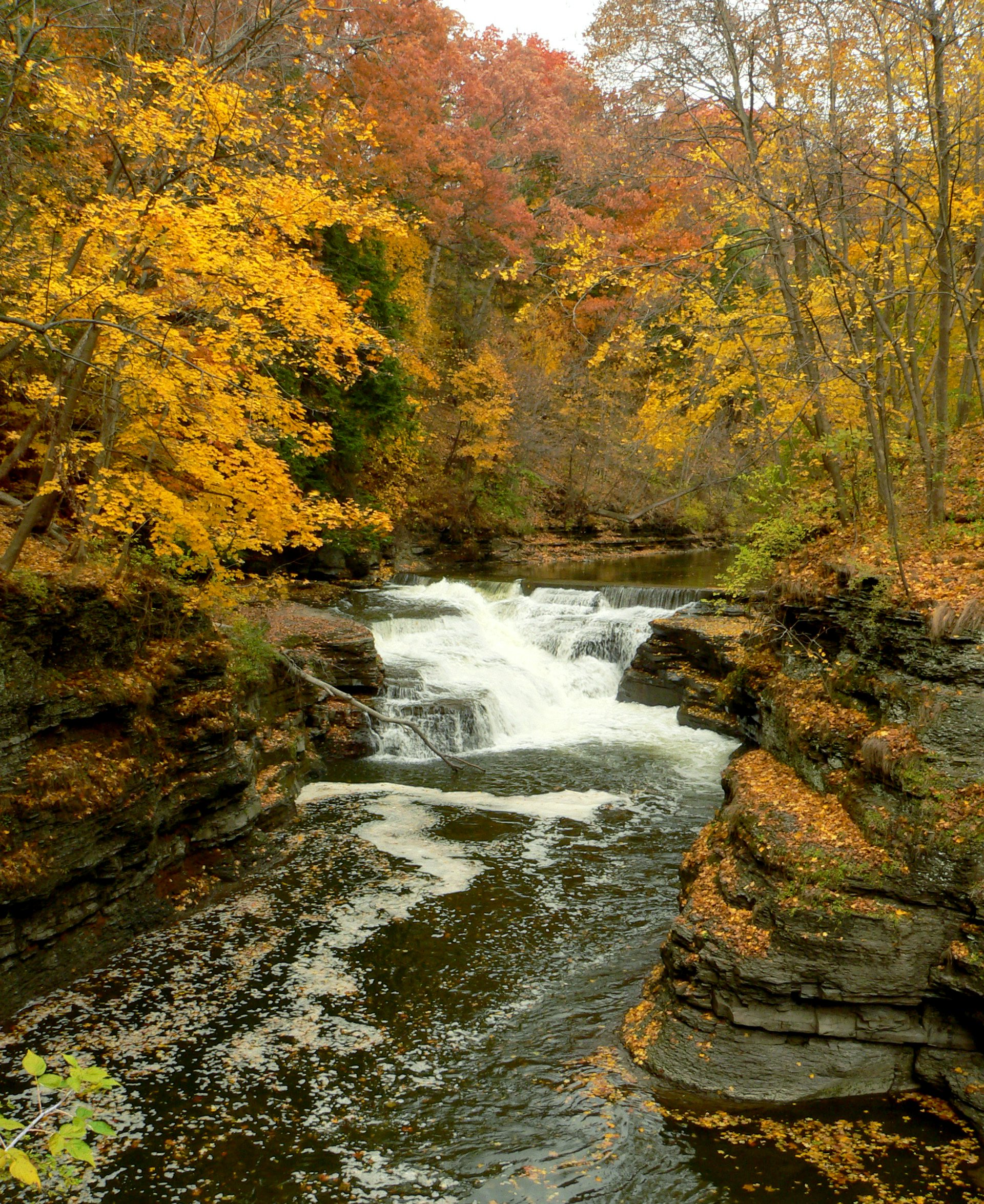
Hemlock Gorge along Fall Creek before emptying into Beebe Lake on Cornell's campus

The valley in which Cayuga Lake is located is long and narrow with a north–south orientation. Ithaca is located at the southern end (the "head") of the lake, but the valley continues to the southwest behind the city. Originally a river valley, it was deepened and widened by the action of Pleistocene ice sheets over the last several hundred thousand years. These ice sheets gouged the land crosswise to preexisting streams, producing hanging valleys. Once the last ice sheets receded — around twenty or thirty thousand years ago — these streams cut deep into the steep hillsides, forming the many distinctive gorges, rapids, and waterfalls seen in the region; examples include Fall and Cascadilla Creeks in Ithaca, and nearby Buttermilk Falls, Enfield Gorge, and Taughannock Falls. Cayuga Lake is the most recent lake in a long series of lakes which developed as the ice retreated northward. The lake drains to the north, and was formed behind a dam of glacial debris called a moraine.

Rock in the region is predominantly Devonian shale and sandstone. North of Ithaca, it is relatively fossil rich. The world-renowned fossils found in this area can be examined at the Museum of the Earth. Glacial erratics can also be found in the area.

Ithaca was founded on flat land just south of the lake — land that formed in fairly recent geological times when silt filled the southern end of the lake. The city ultimately spread to the adjacent hillsides, which rise several hundred feet above the central flats: East Hill, West Hill, and South Hill. The Cornell campus is loosely bounded to the north and south by Fall and Cascadilla Creeks, respectively.

The natural vegetation of the Ithaca area is northern temperate broadleaf forest. It is dominated by deciduous trees, including maple, sycamore, black walnut, birch, and oak; coniferous trees include white pine, Norway spruce, and eastern hemlock. The city of Ithaca has a rich diversity of tree plantings, with over 190 species, including cherry, southern magnolia, and ginkgo. In addition to visual beauty, this species diversification helps reduce the impact of arboreal epidemics, such as that caused by the emerald ash borer.

=== Climate ===
Ithaca

Climate chart (precipitation, max. and min. temperature)
J	F	M	A	M	J	J	A	S	O	N	D
2 32 16	1.9 33 15	2.6 42 24	2.9 55 35	3.3 67 45	3.6 76 54	3.6 81 58	3.5 79 57	3.4 72 50	3.1 60 40	2.7 47 32	2.4 35 21
- █ Average max. and min. temperatures in °F
- █ Precipitation totals in inches
Metric conversion
J	F	M	A	M	J	J	A	S	O	N	D
51 0 −9	49 0 −9	67 5 −4	73 13 2	85 20 7	92 25 12	92 27 15	89 26 14	87 22 10	79 16 4	67 8 0	61 2 −6
- █ Average max. and min. temperatures in °C
- █ Precipitation totals in mm

According to the Köppen climate classification method, Ithaca experiences a warm-summer humid continental climate, also known as a hemiboreal climate (Dfb). Summers are warm but brief, and it is cool-to-cold the rest of the year, with long, snowy winters; an average of 67 in (170 cm) of snow falls per year. In addition, frost may occur any time of year except mid-summer.

Winter is typically characterized by freezing temperatures, cloudy skies and light-to-moderate snows, with some heavier falls; the largest snowfall in one day was 26.0 in (66 cm) on February 14, 1914. But the season is also variable; there can be short mild periods with some rain, but also outbreaks of frigid air with night temperatures down to −10 °F (−23 °C) or lower. Summers usually bring sunshine, along with moderate heat and humidity, but also frequent afternoon thunderstorms. Nights are pleasant and sometimes cool. Occasionally, there can be heatwaves, with temperatures rising into the 95 °F (35 °C) to 100 °F (38 °C) range, but they tend to be brief.

The average date of the first freeze is October 5, and the average date of the last freeze is May 15, giving Ithaca a growing season of 141 days. The average date of the first and last snowfalls are November 12 and April 7, respectively. The hardiness zone is between 5b and 6a. Extreme temperatures range from −25 °F (−32 °C) as recently as February 2, 1961, up to 103 °F (39 °C) on July 9, 1936.

The valley flatland has slightly cooler weather in winter, and occasionally Ithaca residents experience simultaneous snow on the hills and rain in the valley. The phenomenon of mixed precipitation (rain, wind, and snow), common in the late fall and early spring, is known tongue-in-cheek as ithacation to many of the local residents.

Due to the microclimates created by the impact of the lakes, the region surrounding Ithaca (Finger Lakes American Viticultural Area) experiences a short but adequate growing season for winemaking similar to the Rhine Valley wine district of Germany. As such, the region is home to many wineries.

Climate data for Ithaca, New York (Cornell University), 1991–2020 normals and extremes 1893–present
Month	Jan	Feb	Mar	Apr	May	Jun	Jul	Aug	Sep	Oct	Nov	Dec	Year
Record high °F (°C)	70 (21)	73 (23)	85 (29)	91 (33)	96 (36)	102 (39)	103 (39)	101 (38)	100 (38)	91 (33)	81 (27)	69 (21)	103 (39)
Mean maximum °F (°C)	55.6 (13.1)	54.6 (12.6)	64.4 (18.0)	79.2 (26.2)	85.5 (29.7)	89.6 (32.0)	90.5 (32.5)	89.3 (31.8)	87.3 (30.7)	78.1 (25.6)	68.6 (20.3)	57.1 (13.9)	92.6 (33.7)
Mean daily maximum °F (°C)	31.0 (−0.6)	33.1 (0.6)	40.8 (4.9)	54.5 (12.5)	67.3 (19.6)	75.7 (24.3)	79.9 (26.6)	78.5 (25.8)	71.6 (22.0)	59.0 (15.0)	46.8 (8.2)	36.2 (2.3)	56.2 (13.4)
Daily mean °F (°C)	22.8 (−5.1)	24.1 (−4.4)	31.3 (−0.4)	43.7 (6.5)	55.6 (13.1)	64.6 (18.1)	68.9 (20.5)	67.4 (19.7)	60.2 (15.7)	49.0 (9.4)	38.6 (3.7)	29.1 (−1.6)	46.3 (7.9)
Mean daily minimum °F (°C)	14.6 (−9.7)	15.1 (−9.4)	21.8 (−5.7)	32.9 (0.5)	44.0 (6.7)	53.4 (11.9)	57.9 (14.4)	56.3 (13.5)	48.8 (9.3)	38.9 (3.8)	30.4 (−0.9)	22.0 (−5.6)	36.3 (2.4)
Mean minimum °F (°C)	−8.0 (−22.2)	−5.3 (−20.7)	1.8 (−16.8)	19.3 (−7.1)	29.0 (−1.7)	38.7 (3.7)	45.9 (7.7)	43.8 (6.6)	34.0 (1.1)	25.9 (−3.4)	15.5 (−9.2)	3.4 (−15.9)	−10.9 (−23.8)
Record low °F (°C)	−25 (−32)	−25 (−32)	−17 (−27)	−1 (−18)	22 (−6)	31 (−1)	38 (3)	32 (0)	24 (−4)	15 (−9)	−5 (−21)	−22 (−30)	−25 (−32)
Average precipitation inches (mm)	2.24 (57)	1.98 (50)	2.78 (71)	3.40 (86)	3.20 (81)	3.98 (101)	3.90 (99)	3.77 (96)	3.83 (97)	3.70 (94)	2.94 (75)	2.57 (65)	38.29 (973)
Average snowfall inches (cm)	16.6 (42)	14.5 (37)	12.0 (30)	2.8 (7.1)	0.0 (0.0)	0.0 (0.0)	0.0 (0.0)	0.0 (0.0)	0.0 (0.0)	0.2 (0.51)	4.6 (12)	12.2 (31)	62.9 (160)
Average precipitation days (≥ 0.01 in)	16.1	13.1	14.0	13.6	14.6	13.8	12.7	11.7	11.5	15.2	14.1	15.7	166.1
Average snowy days (≥ 0.1 in)	12.3	9.6	7.1	1.7	0.0	0.0	0.0	0.0	0.0	0.1	3.4	9.1	43.3
Source: NOAA

== Demographics ==
Historical population
Census	Pop.	Note	%±
1870	8,462		—
1880	9,105		7.6%
1890	11,079		21.7%
1900	13,136		18.6%
1910	14,802		12.7%
1920	17,004		14.9%
1930	20,708		21.8%
1940	19,730		−4.7%
1950	29,257		48.3%
1960	28,732		−1.8%
1970	26,226		−8.7%
1980	28,732		9.6%
1990	29,541		2.8%
2000	29,287		−0.9%
2010	30,014		2.5%
2020	32,108		7.0%
2024 (est.)	33,768		5.2%
U.S. Decennial Census

=== Racial and ethnic composition ===
Ithaca city, New York – Racial composition
Race (NH = Non-Hispanic)	2020	2010	2000	1990	1980
White alone (NH)	61% (19,572)	66.7% (20,023)	71.3% (20,893)	79.7% (23,541)	87.2% (25,046)
Black alone (NH)	6% (1,927)	6.1% (1,842)	6.3% (1,854)	6.3% (1,850)	6.2% (1,795)
American Indian alone (NH)	0.2% (65)	0.3% (91)	0.3% (99)	0.3% (93)	0.3% (96)
Asian alone (NH)	16.6% (5,318)	16.1% (4,820)	13.6% (3,981)	9.9% (2,916)	3.5% (1,001)
Pacific Islander alone (NH)	0% (11)	0% (11)	0.1% (15)		
Other race alone (NH)	0.6% (204)	0.3% (97)	0.3% (80)	0.2% (73)	0.2% (49)
Multiracial (NH)	5.6% (1,805)	3.6% (1,073)	2.8% (810)	—	—
Hispanic/Latino (any race)	10% (3,206)	6.9% (2,057)	5.3% (1,555)	3.6% (1,068)	2.6% (745)

=== 2020 census ===
As of the 2020 census, Ithaca had a population of 32,108. The median age was 22.9 years. 8.8% of residents were under the age of 18 and 8.1% of residents were 65 years of age or older. For every 100 females there were 104.3 males, and for every 100 females age 18 and over there were 105.6 males age 18 and over.

100.0% of residents lived in urban areas, while 0.0% lived in rural areas.

There were 12,440 households in Ithaca, of which 12.6% had children under the age of 18 living in them. Of all households, 16.8% were married-couple households, 36.1% were households with a male householder and no spouse or partner present, and 40.9% were households with a female householder and no spouse or partner present. About 49.5% of all households were made up of individuals and 8.1% had someone living alone who was 65 years of age or older.

There were 14,011 housing units, of which 11.2% were vacant. The homeowner vacancy rate was 1.6% and the rental vacancy rate was 6.8%.

The most reported ancestries in 2020 were:

- German (12.6%)
- Irish (11.6%)
- English (11.2%)
- Chinese (6.8%)
- Italian (6.6%)
- Indian (3.8%)
- African American (3.8%)
- Scottish (3.5%)
- Polish (3.3%)
- French (3.1%)

Racial composition as of the 2020 census
Race	Number	Percent
White	20,500	63.8%
Black or African American	2,067	6.4%
American Indian and Alaska Native	86	0.3%
Asian	5,334	16.6%
Native Hawaiian and Other Pacific Islander	16	0.0%
Some other race	1,427	4.4%
Two or more races	2,678	8.3%
Hispanic or Latino (of any race)	3,206	10.0%

Ithaca is the principal city of the Ithaca-Cortland Combined Statistical Area, which includes the Ithaca Metropolitan Statistical Area (Tompkins County) and the Cortland Micropolitan Statistical Area (Cortland County), which had a combined population of 145,100 at the 2000 census.

=== 2000 census ===
As of the census of 2000, there were 29,287 people, 10,287 households, and 2,962 families residing in the city. The population density was 5,360.9 people per square mile (2,069.9 people/km^{2}). There were 10,736 housing units at an average density of 1,965.2 per square mile (758.8/km^{2}). The racial makeup of the city was 73.97% White, 13.65% Asian, 6.71% Black or African American, 0.39% Native American, 0.05% Pacific Islander, 1.86% from other races, and 3.36% from two or more races. Hispanic or Latino of any race were 5.31% of the population.

There were 10,287 households, out of which 14.2% had children under the age of 18 living with them, 19.0% were married couples living together, 7.8% had a female householder with no husband present, and 71.2% were non-families. 43.3% of all households were made up of individuals, and 7.4% had someone living alone who was 65 years of age or older. The average household size was 2.13 and the average family size was 2.81.

In the city, the population was spread out, with 9.2% under the age of 18, 53.8% from 18 to 24, 20.1% from 25 to 44, 10.6% from 45 to 64, and 6.3% who were 65 years of age or older. The median age was 22 years. For every 100 females, there were 102.6 males. For every 100 females age 18 and over, there were 102.2 males.

The median income for a household in the city was $21,441, and the median income for a family was $42,304. Males had a median income of $29,562 versus $27,828 for females. The per capita income for the city was $13,408. About 13.2% of individuals and 4.2% of families were below the poverty line.

=== Greater Ithaca ===
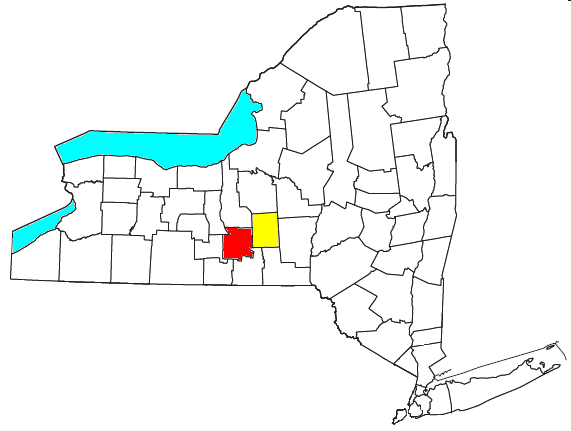
Location of the Ithaca-Cortland census designated area and its components: Ithaca Metropolitan Statistical Area Cortland Micropolitan Statistical Area

The term "Greater Ithaca" encompasses both the City and Town of Ithaca, as well as several smaller settled places within or adjacent to the Town:

Municipalities

- Village of Groton
- Village of Lansing
- the southern part of the Town of Lansing
- Village of Cayuga Heights
- Hamlet of Forest Home
- Hamlet of South Hill

Census-designated places

- East Ithaca
- Northeast Ithaca
- Northwest Ithaca

== Economy ==
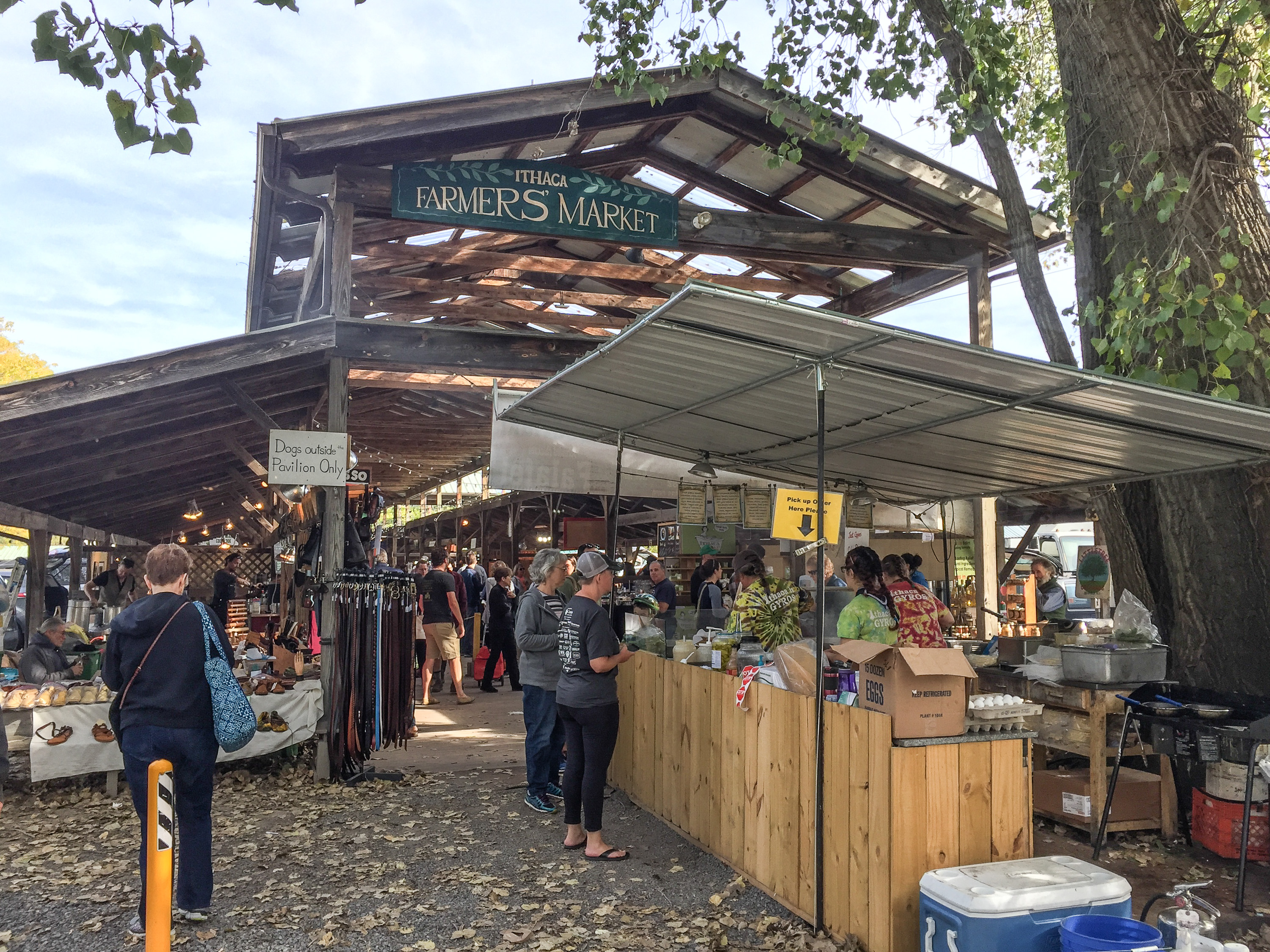
Ithaca Farmer's market at Steamboat Landing

The economy of Ithaca is based on education and further supported by agriculture, technology and tourism. As of 2006, Ithaca has continued to have one of the few expanding economies in New York State outside New York City. It draws commuters for work from the neighboring rural counties of Cortland, Tioga, and Schuyler, as well as from the more urbanized Chemung County.

Ithaca has tried to maintain its traditional downtown shopping area with its pedestrian orientation; this includes the Ithaca Commons pedestrian mall, Press Bay Alley, and Press Bay Court. Another commercial center, Collegetown, is located next to the Cornell campus. It features a number of restaurants, shops and bars, and an increasing number of high-rise apartments. It is primarily frequented by Cornell University students.

Ithaca has many of the businesses characteristic of small American university towns: bookstores, art-house cinemas, craft stores and vegetarian-friendly restaurants. Moosewood Restaurant, founded as a collective in 1973, published a number of vegetarian cookbooks. Bon Appetit magazine ranked it among the thirteen most influential restaurants of the 20th century. Ithaca has many local restaurants and chains, both in the city and town, with a range of ethnic foods.

The Ithaca Farmers Market, a cooperative, first opened for business on Saturdays in 1973. It is located at Steamboat Landing, where steamboats from Cayuga Lake used to dock.

The South Hills Business Campus originally opened in 1957 as the regional headquarters of the National Cash Register Company. Running three full factory shifts, NCR was a major employer. Although it was sold in 1991 to American Telephone and Telegraph and later acquired by Cognitive TPG, it remains a major tenant of the South Hill Business Campus, which is now owned by a group of private investors.

=== Agriculture ===
Ithaca, home to the Cornell University College of Agriculture and Life Sciences, has a deep connection to Central New York's farming and dairy industries. About 60 small farms are located in the greater Ithaca/Trumansburg area, including a number of research farms managed by the Cornell University Agricultural Experiment Station. Cornell's Dairy Research Facility is a center of research and support for New York's large and growing milk and yogurt industries.

== Arts and culture ==
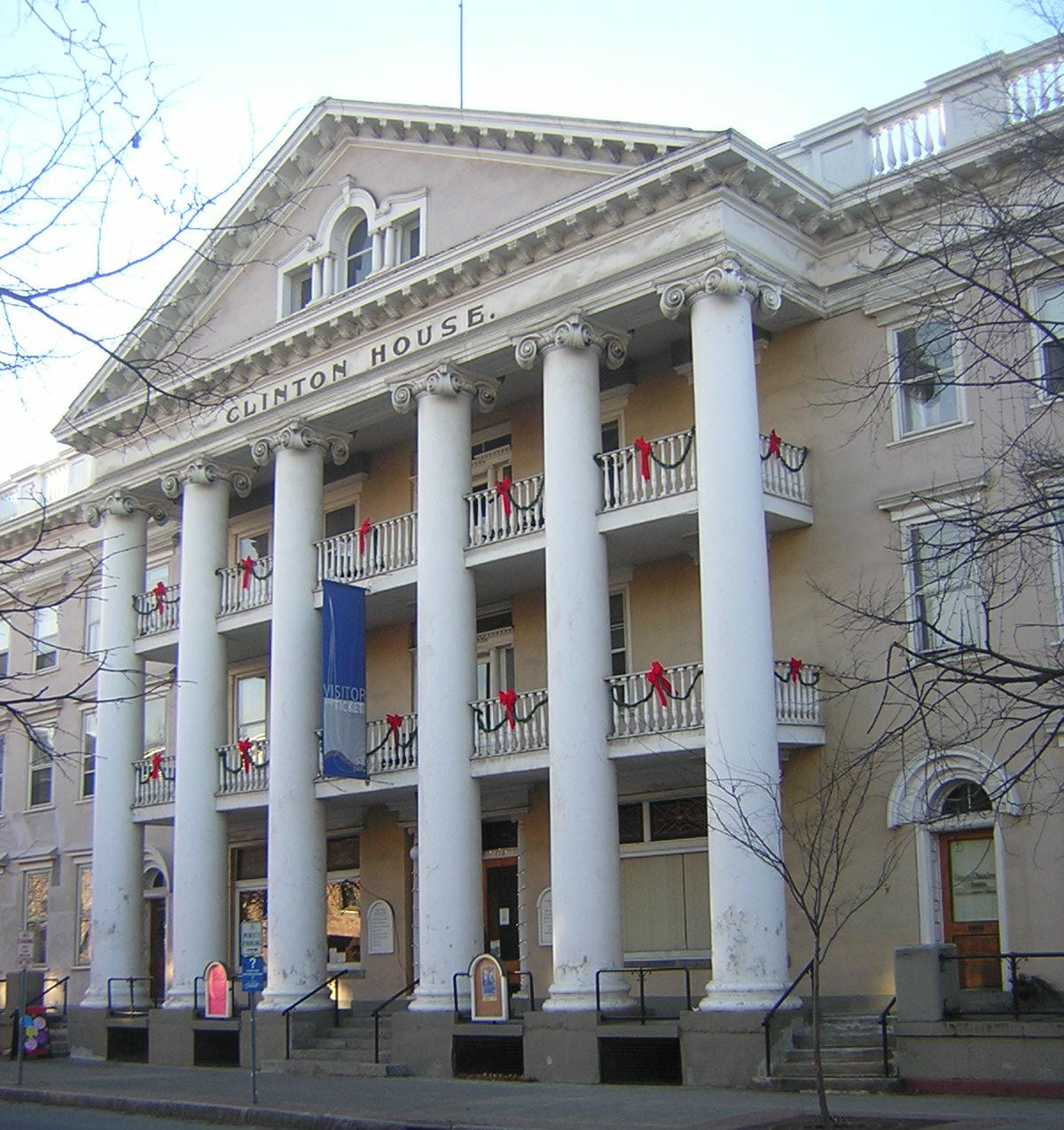
Clinton House, a 19th-century building in downtown Ithaca

Founded in 1983, the Sciencenter is a non-profit hands-on science museum, accredited by the American Alliance of Museums (AAM). It is a member of the Association of Science-Technology Centers (ASTC) and Association of Children's Museums (ACM).

The Museum of the Earth is a natural history museum created in 2003 by the Paleontological Research Institution (PRI). The PRI was founded in Ithaca in 1932 and is the publisher of the oldest journal of paleontology in the Western Hemisphere. Exhibits cover the 4.5-billion-year history of the Earth in an accessible manner, including interactive displays. As of 2004, the PRI is now formally affiliated with Cornell.

The Cayuga Nature Center occupies the site of the 1914 Cayuga Preventorium, a facility for children with tuberculosis; treatment of what was then considered an incurable disease was based on rest and good nutrition. In 1981, the Cayuga Nature Center was incorporated as an independent, private, non-profit educational organization, offering environmental education to local school districts. In 2011, the PRI merged with the Cayuga Nature Center, making it a sister organization to the Museum of the Earth.

The Cornell Lab of Ornithology is located in the Imogene Powers Johnson Center for Birds and Biodiversity. The Lab's Visitors' Center and observation areas are open to the public. Displays include a surround-sound theater, object-theater presentation, sound studio and informational kiosks featuring bird sounds and information.

The Herbert F. Johnson Museum of Art at Cornell houses one of the finest collections of art in upstate New York. Special exhibitions are mounted each year, plus selections from a global permanent collection, which is displayed on six public floors. The collection includes art from throughout Asia, Africa, Europe, the Americas, graphic arts, medallic art and Tiffany glass, ranging from the ancient to the contemporary.

Ithaca has a number of active professional theaters. The Center for the Arts at Ithaca, Inc., operates the "Hangar Theatre". Opened in 1975 in a renovated municipal airport hangar, the Hangar hosts a summer season and brings a range of theatre to regional audiences including students, producing a school tour and Artists-in-the-Schools programs. Ithaca is also the home to Kitchen Theatre Company, a non-profit professional company founded in 1991 with a theatre on West State Street. The Cherry Arts was founded in 2017, operating a flexible theatre, the Cherry Artspace. They present productions of international and unusual works by the Cherry Artists' Collective, as well as hosting performances by other artists and organizations. They also operate the Cherry Gallery, which presents solo and group exhibitions, often in dialogue with their performance works, and the Camilla Schade Studio, which houses rehearsals, salon performances, and the Cherry Art Hive. Beyond these three theaters, Civic Ensemble is a creative collaborative ensemble (without its own performance space) staging emerging playwrights' work and community-based original productions.

Ithaca is noted for its annual community celebration, The Ithaca Festival. Ithaca also hosts one of the largest used-book sales in the United States.

The Constance Saltonstall Foundation for the Arts supports New York State artists and writers through two key programs: free stipend-supported, juried residencies and a self-directed, non-juried, low-cost retreats. Saltonstall was founded in 1995 and is located eight miles outside Ithaca. Between 1996 and 2008, the Saltonstall Foundation provided grants to individual artists and writers from central and western New York counties. Saltonstall hosts Open House events for the public to meet the current artists and writers at the residency and to learn about the foundation.

Founded in 1992, the Namgyal Monastery in Ithaca is the North American seat of the Dalai Lama's Namgyal Monastery.

The city and town also sponsor The Apple Festival in the fall, the Chili Fest in February, the Finger Lakes International Dragon Boat Festival in July, Porchfest in late September and the Ithaca Brew Fest in Stewart Park in September.

Ithaca has also pioneered the Ithaca Health Fund, a popular cooperative health insurance. Ithaca is home to Ithaca Hours, one of the first local currency systems in the United States. It was developed by Paul Glover.

=== Music ===
Ithaca is the home of the Cayuga Chamber Orchestra.

The Cornell Concert Series has been hosting musicians and ensembles of international stature since 1903. For its initial 84 years, the series featured Western classical artists exclusively. In 1987, however, the series broke with tradition to present Ravi Shankar and has since grown to encompass a broader spectrum of the world's great music. Now, it balances a mix of Western classical music, traditions from around the world, jazz, and new music in these genres. In a single season, Cornell Concert Series presents performers ranging from the Leipzig Tomanerchor and Danish Quartet to Simon Shaheen, Vida Guitar Quartet, and Eighth Blackbird.

The School of Music at Ithaca College was founded in 1892 by William Egbert as a music conservatory on Buffalo Street. Among the degree programs offered are those in Performance, Theory, Music Education and Composition. Since 1941, the School of Music has been accredited by the National Association of Schools of Music.

Ithaca's Suzuki school, Ithaca Talent Education, provides musical training for children of all ages and also teacher training for undergraduate and graduate-level students. The Community School of Music and Art uses an extensive scholarship system to offer classes and lessons to any student, regardless of age, background, economic status or artistic ability.

A number of musicians call Ithaca home, most notably Samite of Uganda, The Burns Sisters, The Horse Flies, Johnny Dowd, Mary Lorson, cellist Hank Roberts, Anna Coogan, John Brown's Body, Kurt Riley, X Ambassadors, and Alex Kresovich. Old-time music is a staple, and folk music is featured weekly on WVBR-FM's Bound for Glory, North America's longest-running live folk concert broadcast. The Finger Lakes GrassRoots Festival of Music and Dance, hosted by local band Donna the Buffalo, is held annually during the third week in July in the nearby village of Trumansburg, with more than 60 local, national and international acts.

Ithaca has a live music scene with more than 200 groups performing a wide range of American popular and world music. Common genres include folk, rock, blues, jazz, country, lo-fi, and reggae. There are also more than 80 live music venues within a 40-mile radius of the city, including cafes, pubs, clubs, and concert halls.

== Government ==
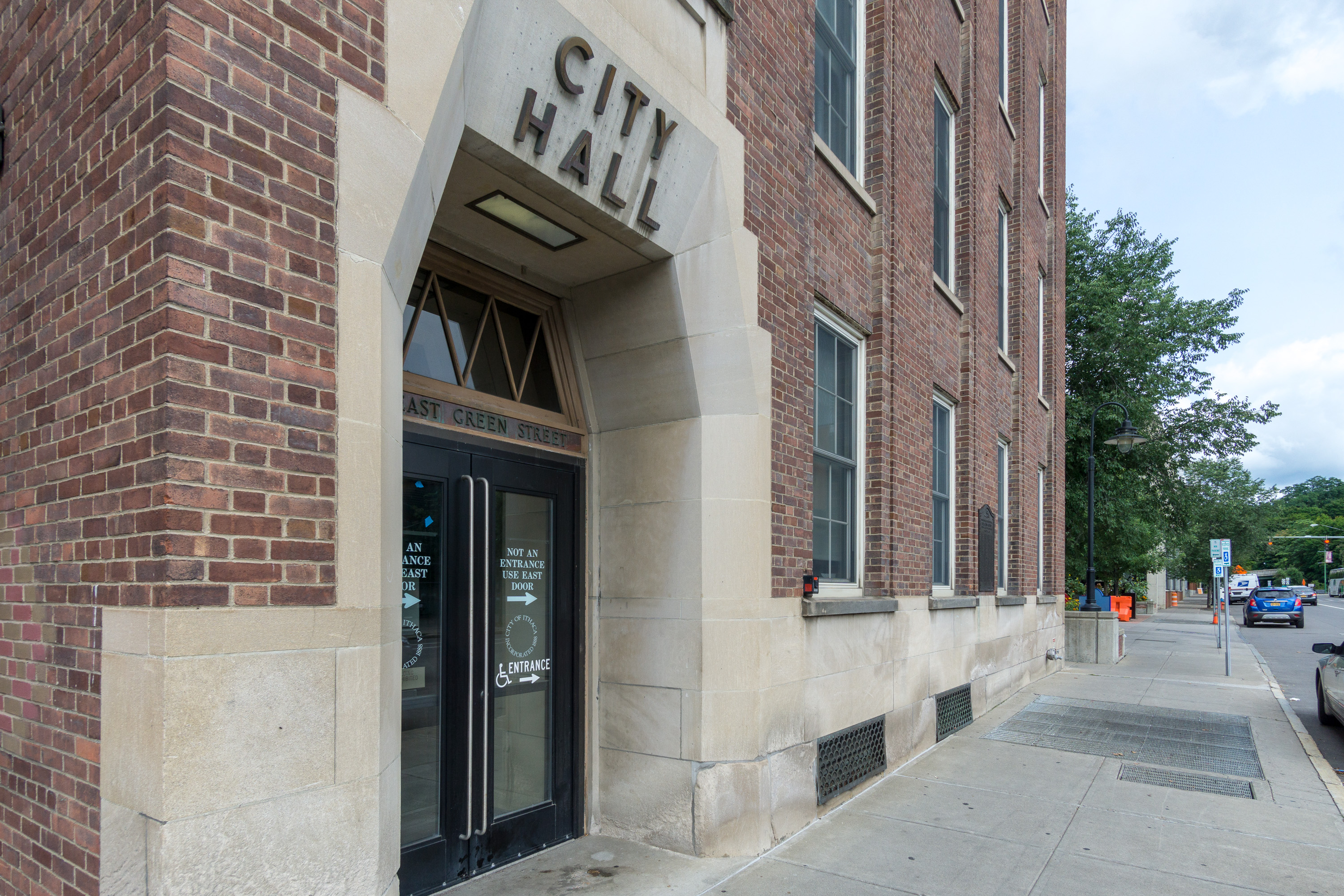
Ithaca City Hall at 108 East Green Street

There are two governmental entities in the area: the Town of Ithaca and the City of Ithaca. The Town of Ithaca is one of the nine towns comprising Tompkins County. The City of Ithaca is surrounded by, but legally independent of the Town of Ithaca.

The City of Ithaca has a council–manager government. The charter of the City of Ithaca provides for a full-time mayor and the Uniform City Court Act provides for two, full-time city court judges. Since 1995, the mayor has been elected to a four-year term, and since 1989, the city court judges have been elected to a ten-year term. At a referendum in 2022, city voters approved a city charter amendment adopting from a council–manager government in place of a mayor–council government. The city's first city manager, Deb Mohlenhoff, took office on January 1, 2024. Mohlenhoff resigned, effective December 31, 2026, following a request by the Common Council.

Since 1983, the city has been divided into five wards. Each elects two representatives to the city council, known as the Common Council, for staggered four-year terms. In March 2015, the Common Council unanimously adopted a resolution recognizing freedom from domestic violence as a fundamental human right. In September 2023, the Common Council unanimously passed an extensive local ordinance to "protect, defend and shield transgender individuals".

In December, 2005, the City and Town governments began discussing opportunities for increased government consolidation, including the possibility of joining the two into a single entity. This topic had been previously discussed in 1963 and 1969. Cayuga Heights, a village adjacent to the city on its northeast, voted against annexation into the city of Ithaca in 1954. The City of Ithaca and the Town of Ithaca do share several services. The town contracts with the city for fire protection services, which are provided by the Ithaca Fire Department, and the two are co-owners of the Ithaca Area Waste Water Treatment Facility.

=== Politics ===
Mayoral election results
Year	Democratic	Republican	Independent
1975	Edward Conley 61%	Anne Jones 38%	
1977	Edward Conley 54%	Vincent Giordano 46%	
1979	Raymond Bordoni 30%	William Shaw 27%	
1981	John Gutenberger 47%	William Shaw 53%	
1983	John Gutenberger 58%	William Shaw 42%	
1985	John Gutenberger 68%	Charlotte Stone 32%	
1987	John Gutenberger 72%	Reuben Weiner 28%	
1989	Benjamin Nichols 52%	Jean Cookingham 48%	
1991	Benjamin Nichols 53%	Mark Finkelstein 47%	
1995	Benjamin Nichols 48%		Alan Cohen 51%
1999	Daniel Hoffman 46%		Alan Cohen 54%
2003	Carolyn Peterson 61%	John Saul 27%	
2007	Carolyn Peterson 98%		
2011	Svante Myrick 54%	Janis Kelly 7%	Wade Wykstra 25%
2015	Svante Myrick 89%		
2019	Svante Myrick 76%		Adam Levine 23%
2023	Robert Cantelmo 86%	Janis Kelly 9%	

Politically, the majority of the city's voters (many of them students) have supported liberalism and the Democratic Party. A November 2004 study by ePodunk lists it as New York's most liberal city. This contrasts with the more conservative leanings of the generally rural Upstate New York region. The city's voters are also more liberal than those in the rest of Tompkins County, although the county was last carried by a Republican presidential candidate in 1980. In 2008, Barack Obama, running against New York State's US Senator Hillary Clinton, won Tompkins County in the Democratic Presidential Primary, the only county that he won in New York State. Obama won Tompkins County (including Ithaca) by a wide margin of 41% over his opponent John McCain in the November 2008 election. Tompkins County is currently part of New York's 19th congressional district.

=== Ithaca Police Department ===
The Ithaca Police Department (IPD) is responsible for all public safety and law enforcement services within the municipal boundaries of Ithaca. The IPD was established on June 1, 1888, upon Ithaca's formal incorporation as a city. As of 2024, it consisted of 54 employees including department chief Thomas Kelly.

The City of Ithaca Common Council oversees IPD and makes budgeting determinations on behalf of the department.

The Ithaca Police Benevolent Association (IPBA) is a police union established by members of IPD.

=== Sister city ===
Ithaca is a sister city of:

- Eldoret, Kenya
- Pokhara, Nepal

== Education ==
=== Colleges ===
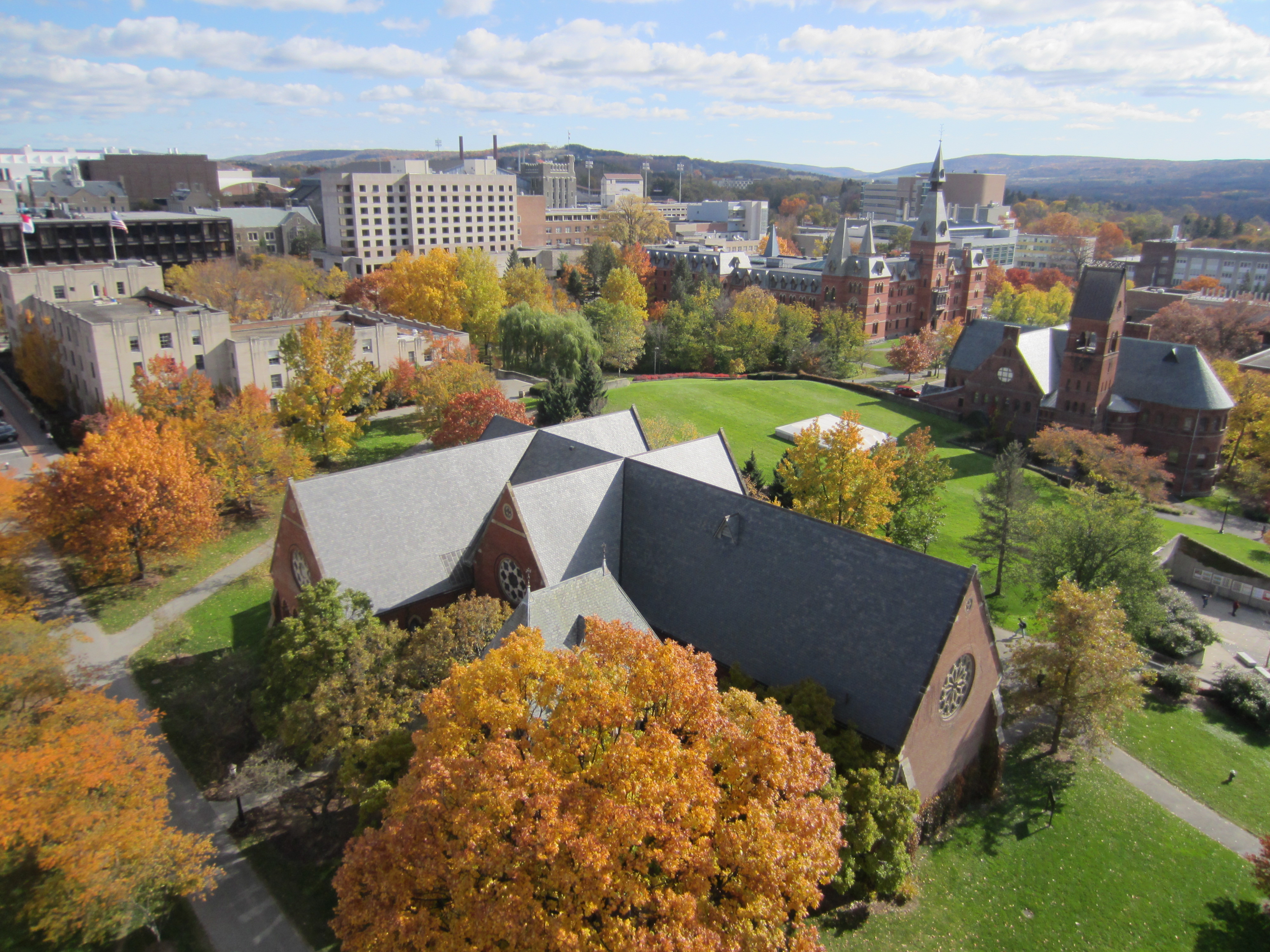
Sage Chapel at Cornell University

Ithaca is a major educational center in Central New York. The two major post-secondary educational institutions located in Ithaca were each founded in the late 19th century. In 1865, Ezra Cornell founded Cornell University, which overlooks the town from East Hill. It was opened as a coeducational institution. Women first enrolled in 1870. Ezra Cornell also established a public library for the city. Ithaca College was founded as the Ithaca Conservatory of Music in 1892. Ithaca College was originally located in the downtown area but relocated to South Hill in the 1960s. In 2018, there were 23,600 students enrolled at Cornell and 6,700 at Ithaca College. Tompkins Cortland Community College is located in the neighboring town of Dryden, and has an extension center in downtown Ithaca. Empire State College offers non-traditional college courses to adults in downtown Ithaca.

=== Public schools ===
The Ithaca City School District, based in Ithaca, encompasses the city and its surrounding area and enrolls about 5,500 K-12 students in eight elementary schools (roughly one for every neighborhood), two middle schools (Boynton and Dewitt), Ithaca High School and the Lehman Alternative Community School, a combined middle and high school. Several private elementary and secondary schools are located in the Ithaca area, including the Roman Catholic Immaculate Conception School, the Cascadilla School, the New Roots Charter School, the Elizabeth Ann Clune Montessori School, the Namaste Montessori School (in the Trumansburg area) and the Ithaca Waldorf School. Ithaca has two networks for supporting its home-schooling families: Loving Education At Home (LEAH) and the Northern Light Learning Center (NLLC). TST BOCES is located in Tompkins County.

=== Library ===
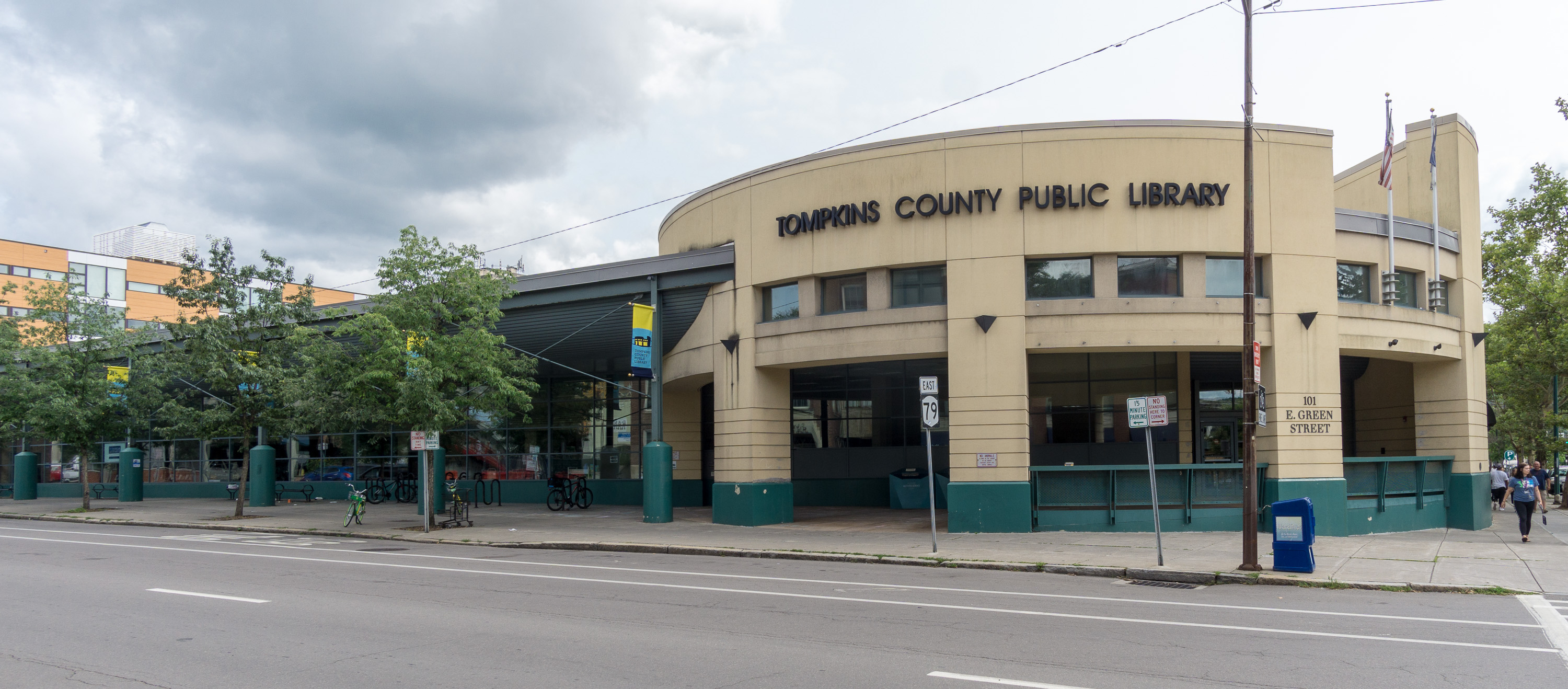
Tompkins County Public Library

The Tompkins County Public Library, located at 101 East Green Street, serves as the public library for Tompkins County and is the Central Library for the Finger Lakes Library System. The library serves over 38,000 registered borrowers and contains nearly 260,000 items in its circulating collection, and circulates about 800,000 items annually.

== Media ==
The Ithaca Journal, founded in 1815, is a morning daily newspaper that has been owned by Gannett since 1912. The Ithaca Voice is a nonprofit digital news site with a mission to improve civic and political understanding in Ithaca and Tompkins County. The Ithaca Times is a free alternative weekly newspaper that's published every Wednesday. The Cornell Daily Sun is also published in Ithaca, operating since 1880. Other media outlets include the online magazine 14850.com.

Ithaca is home to several radio stations:

- WICB 91.7 FM is a non-commercial, student-run station owned by Ithaca College.
- WPIE 1160 AM/107.1 FM "ESPN Ithaca" is a sports talk station locally owned by Taughannock Media.
- WQNY "Q-Country" 103.7 FM, owned by The Cayuga Radio Group, a subsidiary of Saga Communications, Inc.
- WRFI 88.1 FM, Ithaca Community Radio, has a studio and offices in the Clinton House, and also broadcasts at 89.7 FM throughout the Southern Finger Lakes and at WINO 91.9 FM in Watkins Glen.
- WVBR-FM 93.5 FM/105.5 FM, affiliated with Cornell University, is a student-owned and operated commercial station with music, sports including Cornell hockey, and community members hosting specialty programming.
- WYXL "Lite Rock" 97.3 FM
- News/talk WHCU 870 AM
- Progressive talk WNYY 1470 AM
- Classic rock "I-100" WIII 99.9 FM

Public radio:

- WSQG 90.9 FM, WSKG-FM's Ithaca frequency, provides NPR and classical music programming.
- WITH 90.1 FM is the local translator for public radio and AAA station WRUR-FM in Rochester.

Other FM stations include: Saga's "98.7 The Vine", a low-powered translator station; WFIZ "Z95.5", airing a top-40 (CHR) format; contemporary Christian music station WCII 88.9; and classic rock "The Wall" WLLW 99.3 and 96.3, based in Seneca Falls with a transmitter in Ithaca.

== Transportation ==
In 2009, the Ithaca metropolitan statistical area (MSA) ranked as the highest in the United States for the percentage of commuters who walked to work (15.1 percent). In 2013, the Ithaca MSA ranked as the second-lowest in the United States for percentage of commuters who traveled by private vehicle (68.7 percent). During the same year, 17.5 percent of commuters in the Ithaca MSA walked to work.

=== Roads ===
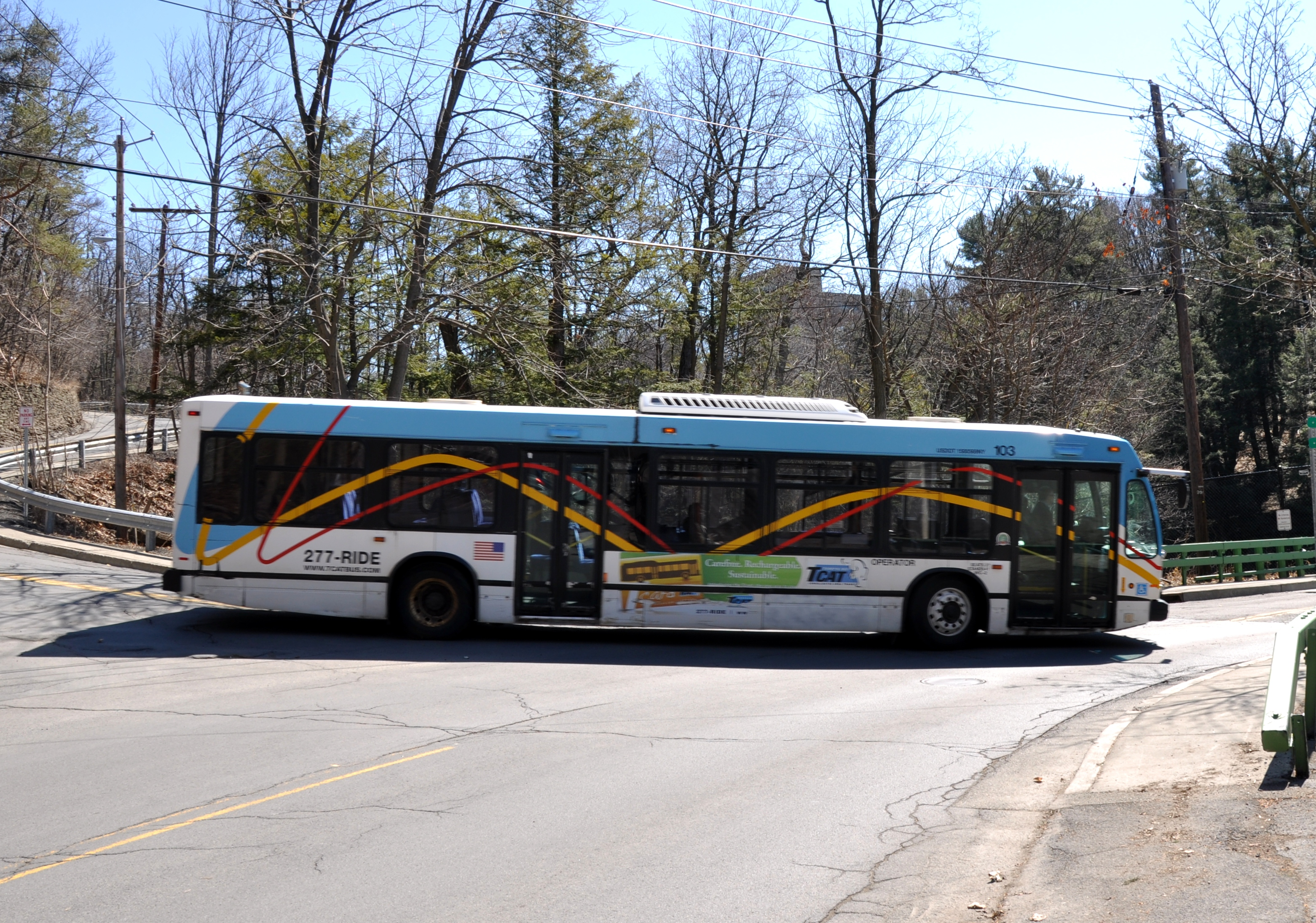
A TCAT bus

Route 13 in Ithaca, photographed for the Voyager Golden Record

Ithaca is in the rural Finger Lakes region about 225 miles (362 km) northwest of New York City; the nearest larger cities, Binghamton and Syracuse, are an hour's drive away by car, Rochester and Scranton are two hours, Buffalo and Albany are three hours. New York City, Philadelphia, Toronto, and Ottawa are approximately four hours away.

Ithaca lies at over a half-hour's drive from any interstate highway, and all car trips to Ithaca involve some driving on two-lane state rural highways. The city is at the convergence of many regional two-lane state highways: Routes 13, 13A, 34, 79, 89, 96, 96B and 366. These are usually not congested except in Ithaca proper. However, Route 79 between the I-81 access at Whitney Point and Ithaca receives a significant amount of Ithaca-bound congestion right before Ithaca's colleges reopen after breaks.

In July 2008, a non-profit called Ithaca Carshare began a carsharing service in Ithaca. Ithaca Carshare has a fleet of vehicles shared by over 1500 members as of July, 2015 and has become a popular service among both city residents and the college communities. Vehicles are located throughout Ithaca downtown and at the two major institutions. With Ithaca Carshare as the first locally-run carsharing organization in New York State, others have since launched in Buffalo, Albany, and Syracuse.

Rideshare services to promote carpooling and vanpooling are operated by ZIMRIDE and VRIDE. A community mobility education program, Way2Go, is operated by Cornell Cooperative Extension of Tompkins County. Way2Go's website provides consumer information and videos. Way2Go works collaboratively to help people save money, stress less, go green and improve mobility options. The 2-1-1 Tompkins/Cortland Help line connects people with services, including transportation, in the community, by telephone and web on a 24/7 basis. The information and referral service is operated by the Human Services Coalition of Tompkins County, Inc. Together, 2-1-1 Information and Referral and Way2Go are a one-call, one-click resource designed to mobility services information for Ithaca and throughout Tompkins County.

=== Inter-City Bus Service ===
There is frequent intercity bus service by Greyhound Lines, New York Trailways, OurBus, FlixBus, and Shortline (Coach USA), particularly to Binghamton and New York City, with limited service to Rochester, Buffalo and Syracuse, and via connections in Binghamton to Utica and Albany. OurBus provides limited holiday services to Allentown, Pennsylvania, Philadelphia, and Washington, D.C.. Cornell University runs a premium campus-to-campus bus between its Ithaca campus and its medical school in Manhattan, New York City, which is open to the public. Starting in September 2019, intercity buses began serving Ithaca from the downtown bus stop at 131 East Green Street after the former Greyhound bus station on West State Street closed due to staff retirement and building maintenance issues. OurBus now picks up and drops off on Seneca Street, near the downtown Hilton Garden Inn.

=== Local Bus Service ===
Ithaca is the center of an extensive bus public transportation network. Tompkins Consolidated Area Transit, Inc. (TCAT, Inc.) is a not-for-profit corporation that provides public transportation for Tompkins County, New York. TCAT was reorganized as a non-profit corporation in 2004 and is primarily supported locally by Cornell University, the City of Ithaca and Tompkins County. TCAT is governed by a nine-member board of directors with three directors each being recommended by the City of Ithaca, Tompkins County, and Cornell University.

TCAT's ridership increased from 2.7 million in 2004 to 4.4 million in 2013. TCAT operates 34 routes, many running seven days a week. It has frequent service to downtown, Cornell University, Ithaca College, and The Shops at Ithaca Mall in the Lansing, New York, but less frequent service to residential and rural areas, including Trumansburg and Newfield. Chemung County Transit (C-TRAN) runs weekday commuter service from Chemung County to Ithaca. Cortland Transit runs commuter service to Cornell University. Tioga County Public Transit operated three routes to Ithaca and Cornell, but ceased operations on November 30, 2014.

Gadabout Transportation Services, Inc. provides demand-response paratransit service for Tompkins County residents 55 and older, and people with disabilities. Ithaca Dispatch provides local and regional taxi service. In addition, Ithaca Airline Limousine and IthaCar Service connect to the local airports.

=== Airports ===
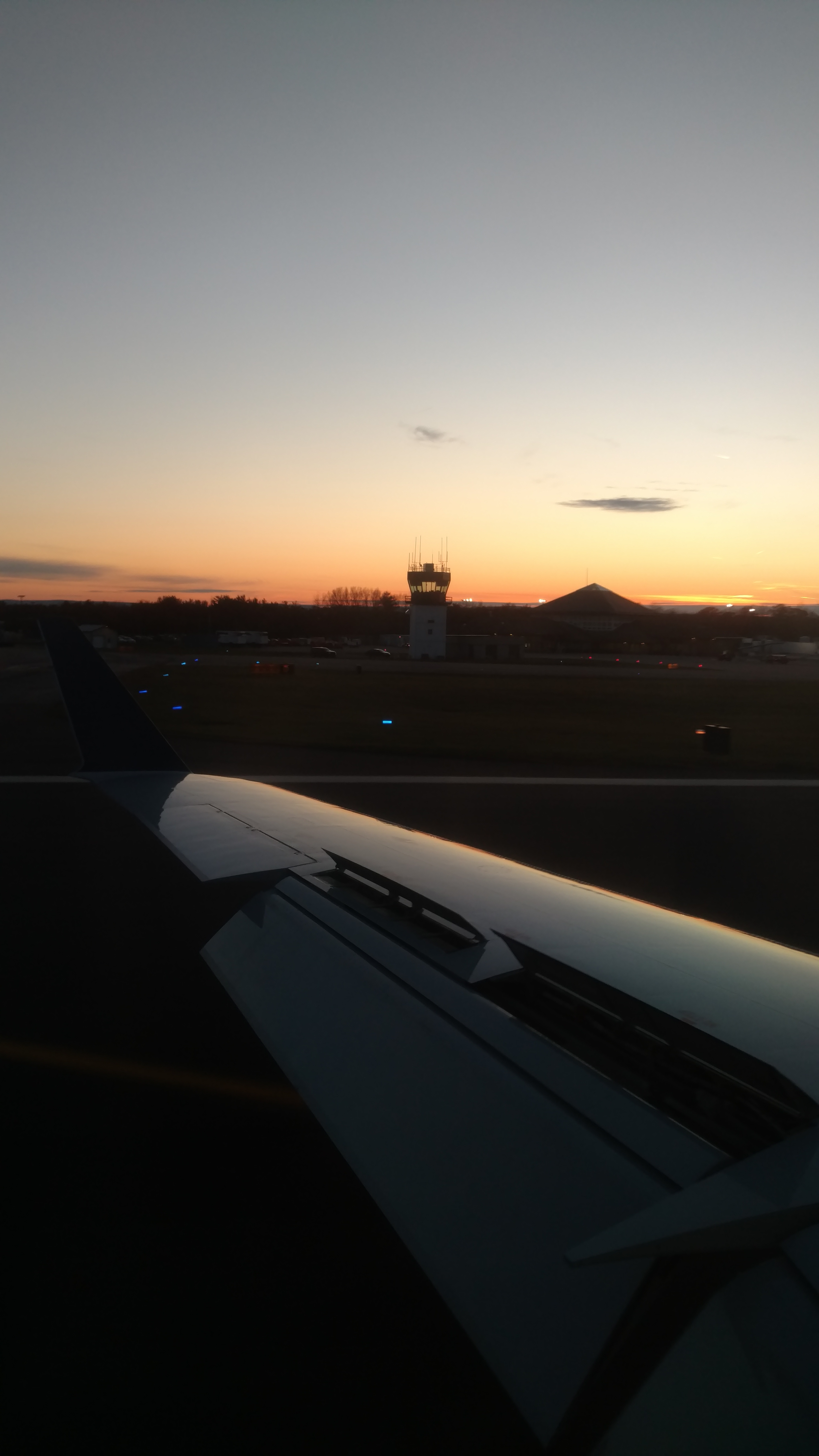
Ithaca Tompkins International Airport viewed from a taxiing plane

Ithaca is served by Ithaca Tompkins International Airport, located about three miles to the northeast of the city center. In late 2019, the airport completed a major $34.8 million renovation which included a larger terminal with additional passenger gates and jet bridges, expanded passenger amenities and a 5,000 square feet (460 m^{2}) customs facility that enables it to receive international charter and private flights.

American Airlines pulled out of Ithaca on September 7, 2022, citing pilot shortages. Delta Connection provides service to and from John F. Kennedy International Airport, operated by its commuter partner Endeavor Air, using the Bombardier CRJ900. United Express offers daily flights to its hub at Newark Liberty International Airport, operated by its commuter partners GoJet Airlines and Republic Airways, using the Bombardier CRJ700 and the Embraer E175, respectively.

=== Railways ===
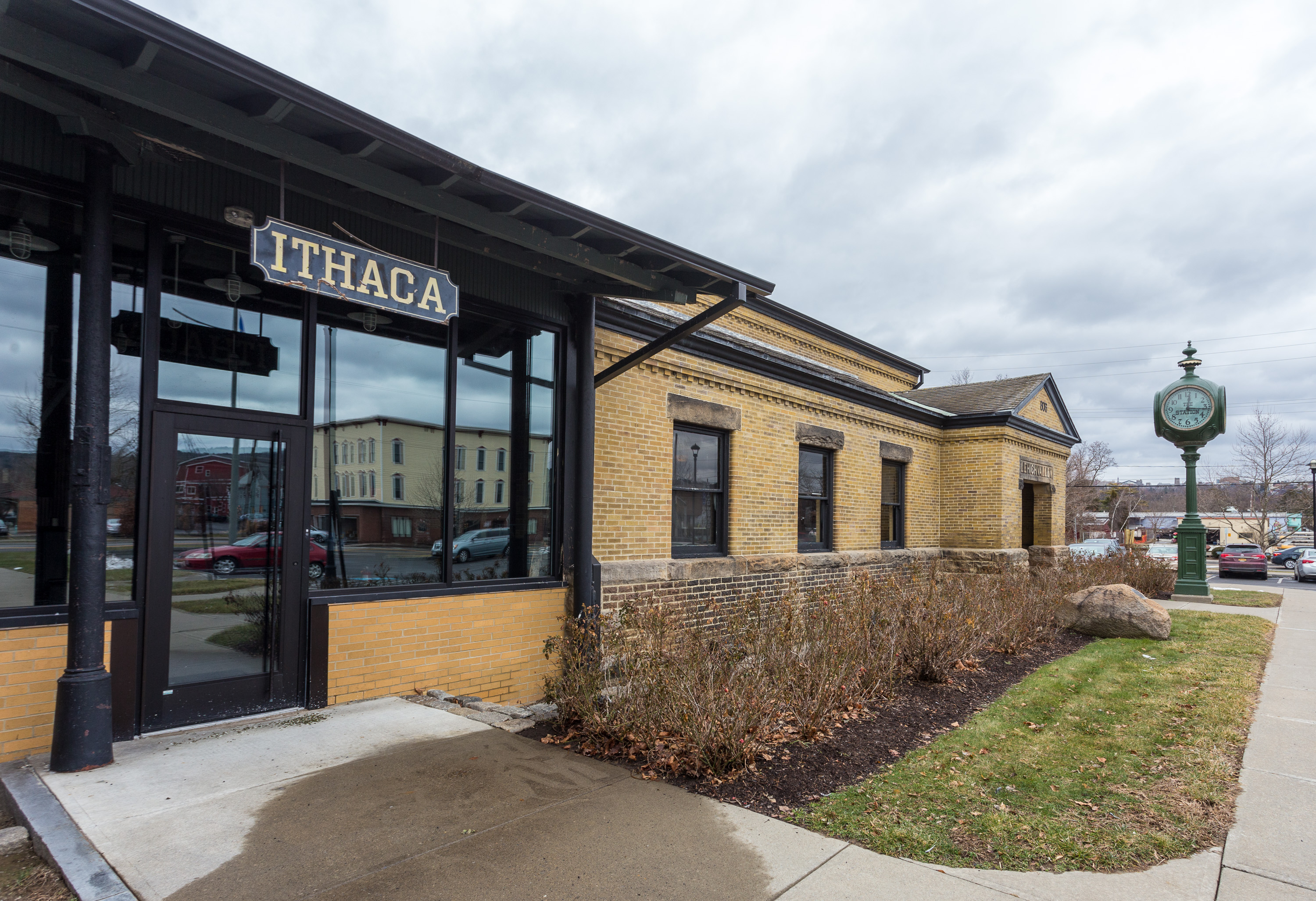
Lehigh Valley Railroad station, built in 1898, has been refurbished and is now a Chemung Canal Trust Company bank branch

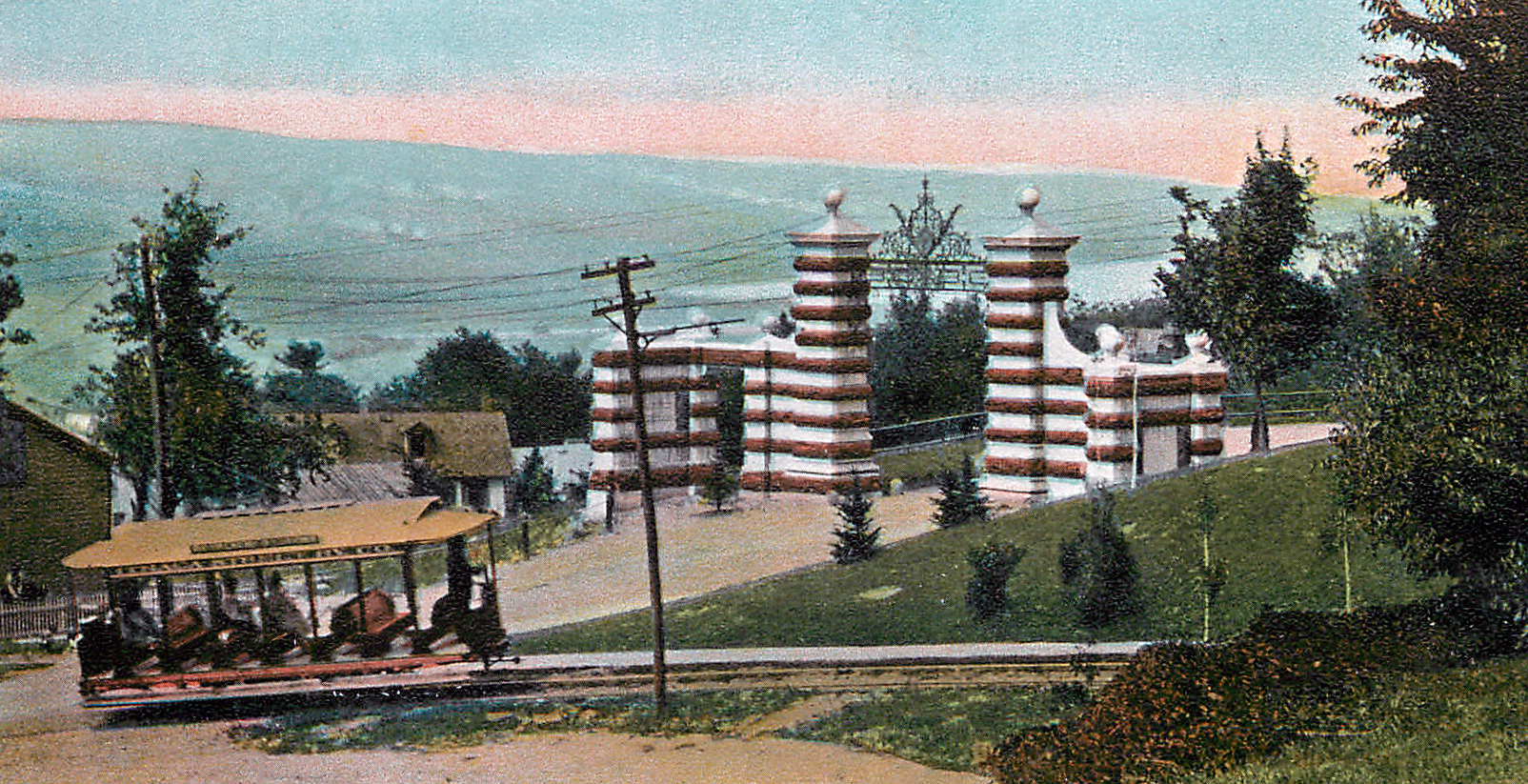
A 1907 illustration of a streetcar passing Eddy Gate, the main entrance to Cornell University at the time

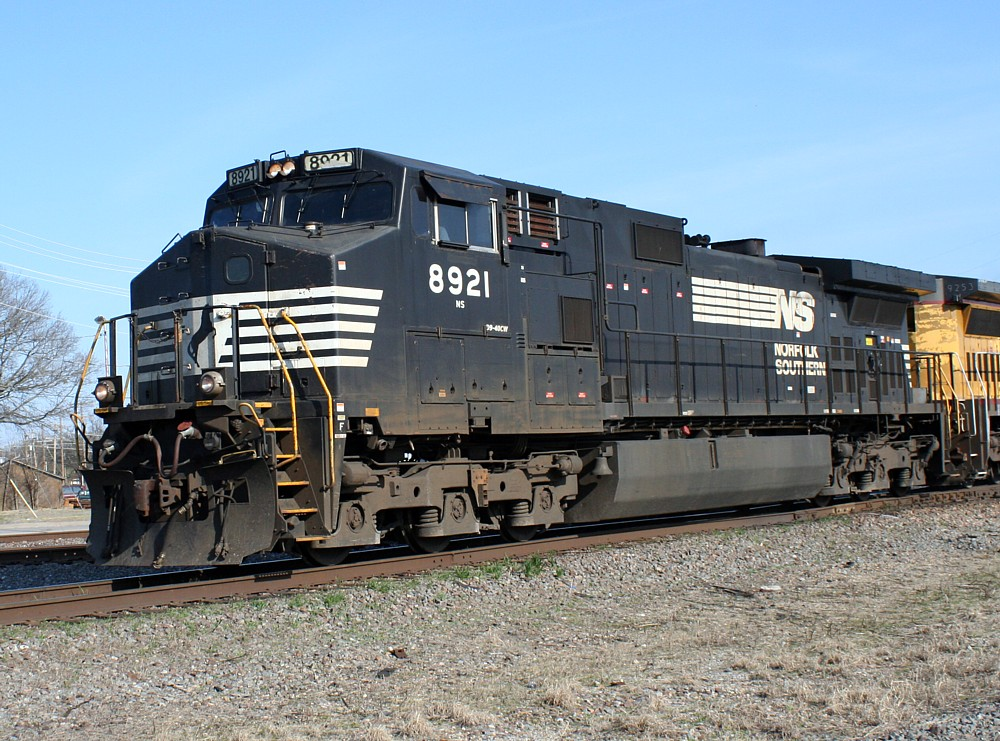
A Norfolk Southern Railway locomotive

Into the mid-20th century, it was possible to reach Ithaca by passenger rail. At least two trains per day serviced Ithaca along the Delaware, Lackawanna and Western Railroad until 1942, or the Lehigh Valley Railroad. The trip took about seven hours from New York City, about eight hours from Philadelphia, and about three hours from Buffalo, New York. There has been no passenger rail service since February 4, 1961.

Beginning in the 1870s, there were trains to Buffalo via Geneva, New York, to New York City via Wilkes-Barre, Pennsylvania on the Lehigh Valley Railroad, to Hoboken, New Jersey with a train change in Owego via Binghampton and Scranton, Pennsylvania on the Delaware, Lackawanna and Western Railroad, and to the U.S. Northeast via Cortland, New York on the Lehigh Valley Railroad. The Lehigh Valley's top New York City-Ithaca-Buffalo passenger train, the daylight Black Diamond, was publicized as "The Handsomest Train in the World," but it took a roundabout route to New York City, traveling south to Waverly, New York, to Wilkes-Barre and Easton, and then across New Jersey. It was named after the railroad's largest commodity, anthracite coal, and made its last run on May 11, 1959.

Until March 1942, the Lackawanna Railroad operated two shuttle trains a day between Ithaca and Owego, where passengers could transfer to westbound trains to Buffalo and Chicago or eastbound to Binghamton, Scranton, Pennsylvania, and Hoboken, New Jersey, across the Hudson River from New York City. Until September 15, 1958, the Lackawanna maintained Syracuse-Binghamton service through nearby Cortland, to the east. Until May 11, 1959, two Lehigh Valley trains a day made both westbound and eastbound stops in Ithaca. The last passenger train making stops in Ithaca was the Lehigh Valley's overnight Maple Leaf, which discontinued in February 1961.

Within Ithaca, electric railways ran along Stewart Avenue and Eddy Street. Ithaca was the fourth community in New York state with a street railway; streetcars ran from 1887 until the summer of 1935.

In December 2018, the Ithaca Central Railroad, a Watco subsidiary, took over operation via lease of the 48.8-mile (78.5 km) Norfolk Southern Ithaca Secondary line from Sayre, Pennsylvania to the Cargill Salt mine site on the eastern shore of Cayuga Lake, near Myers Point. Unit coal trains carrying bituminous coal were delivered to the Ithaca Central at Sayre by Norfolk Southern for less than eight months afterward, traveling to the Ridge site of the Cayuga Operating Company: a coal-burning power plant known as Milliken Station during NYSEG ownership. The power plant closed on August 29, 2019. As of 2022, there are proposed plans to convert its brownfield site into a major data center. The main rail freight traffic is now salt from the Cargill salt mine farther north. Norfolk Southern's tracks, headed north on the former Lehigh Valley Auburn and Ithaca Branch, include a distinctive section in Ithaca that runs along the side of Fulton St. (NY13 southbound), although not in the street itself.

== Points of interest ==
- Buttermilk Falls State Park
- Carl Sagan's Grave
- Cayuga Nature Center
- Cornell Botanic Gardens
- Cornell University
- Finger Lakes Trail
- Ithaca College
- Ithaca Commons
- Ithaca Dog Park
- Ithaca Falls
- Paleontological Research Institution's Museum of the Earth
- Robert H. Treman State Park
- Sagan Planet Walk
- Sapsucker Woods Sanctuary
- Sciencenter
- Stewart Park
- Taughannock Falls State Park
The falls at Buttermilk Falls State Park

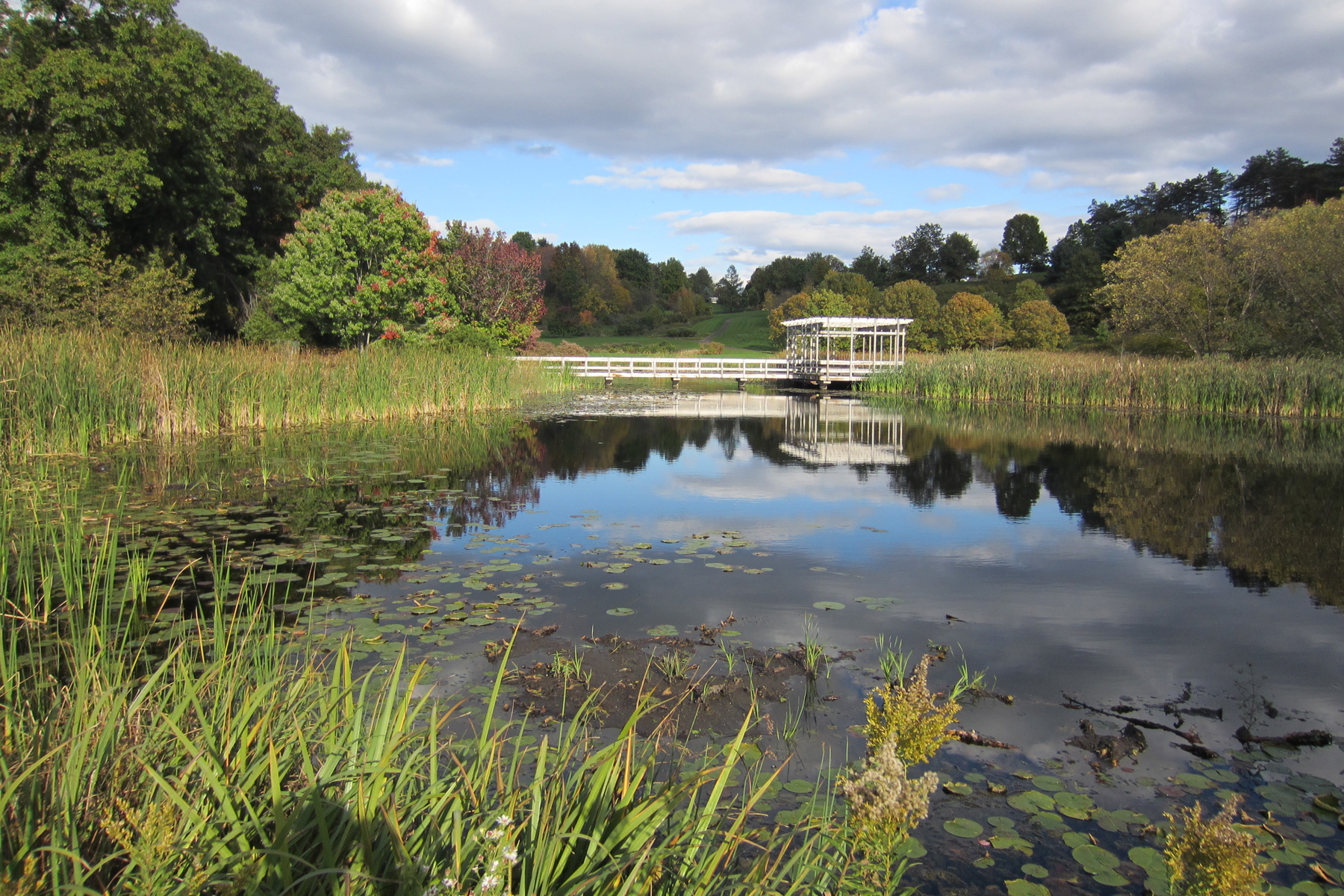
Cornell Botanic Gardens at Cornell University

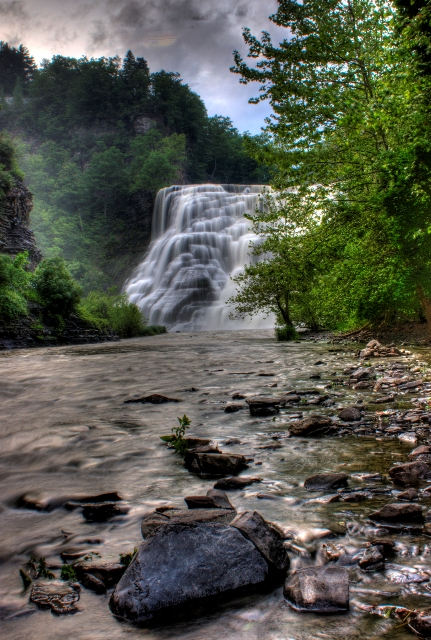
Ithaca Falls

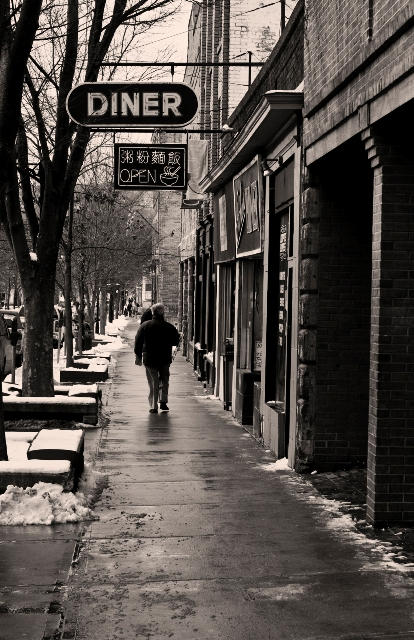
Ithaca Diner

== Sister cities ==
Ithaca's sister cities are:

- Eldoret, Kenya
- Huế, Vietnam
- Pokhara, Nepal

== Reputation ==
In addition to its liberal politics, Ithaca is commonly listed among the most culturally liberal of American small cities. In 1997, Utne Reader named Ithaca "America's most enlightened town". As of 2007, according to ePodunk's Gay Index, Ithaca has a score of 231, versus a national average score of 100. Like many small college towns, Ithaca has also received accolades for having a high overall quality of life.

In its earliest years, during the frontier days, what is now Ithaca was briefly known by the names "The Flats" and "Sodom," the name of the Biblical city of sin, due to its reputation as a town of "notorious immorality", a place of horse racing, gambling, profanity, Sabbath-breaking and readily-available liquor. Simeon De Witt renamed the town Ithaca for Odysseus's home island in the early 19th century, though nearby Robert H. Treman State Park still contains Lucifer Falls. Ithaca is primarily known for its growing wineries and microbreweries, live music, colleges and small dairy farms.

== See also ==
- Ezra Cornell
- List of Registered Historic Places in New York
