= George Sylvanus Moler =

Cornell physics professor, innovator

George Sylvanus Moler (1851-May 20, 1932) was a professor of physics at Cornell University in Ithaca, New York. He co-built an early commercial dynamo and used stop motion photography of a skeleton to make a film. He also worked on arc lighting, electrolytic, and photographic equipment. He helped plan and develop Cornell's photographic studio in Rockefeller Hall. He was a professor at Cornell for about 40 years. He is known for his innovations in applied science.

He graduated from Sibley College in 1875 and was profiled in the Sibley Journal of Engineering in 1916. He graduated from Hedding College and Cornell. He was a student, an assistant, and then a colleague of William Arnold Anthony at Cornell.

He was photographed at Cornell's photo studio.

He reached Cornell's age limit and retired effective June 1917.

== Writings ==
- A Laboratory manual of physics and applied electricity, co-author
