= Ithaca Dog Park =

Dog park in New York, United States

Coordinates: 42°27′26.75″N 76°31′02.07″W

Ithaca Dog Park is an official dog park in Ithaca, New York and is part of the New York State park system. The park was initially developed by the Tomkins County Dog Owners Group, the city of Ithaca, and the New York State Parks Commission.

The park is located on the Festival Lands, adjacent to the Allan H. Treman State Marine Park at the head of Cayuga Lake, with parts of the park on state park land and other parts on city land. The beach, which is on state land, has a relatively underdeveloped shoreline and is used by dogs for swimming. The park land was created when dredging spoils were dumped there in the 1960s. The park is fenced around two separate areas and includes a city water supply, child-sized swimming pools for dogs, shaded tree areas, benches and picnic tables and is frequently visited by birdwatchers, joggers, skiers, picnickers, and strollers.

== Tompkins County Dog Owners Group ==
The Tompkins County Dog Owners Group (TCDOG) advocates for and supports the park on behalf of dog owners.

The City of Ithaca and the New York State Parks Commission, along with the Town of Ithaca, the Tompkins County Board, and park user groups are in the process of planning a fenced-in, off-leash area for a dog park at the marina. As of February 2008, there is a temporary fenced-in area where Ithacans and others can bring their dogs to exercise. Dogs outside the fenced area are required to be leashed. The officially approved off-leash area was relocated and expanded in May 2008 to straddle both city- and state-owned land.

== Temporary park ==
On December 5, 2007, the Common Council voted unanimously to extend the leash law exemption. This extended the temporary legal dog park within a fenced-in area of the city's Festival Lands until April 3, 2008, and involved constructing a $6,000 temporary fence around the festival lands. Building this fence was expected to mitigate opposition to the park, though opponents argued that it was pointless to erect a fence to keep the dogs away from people when the city had acknowledged that dog walkers are the only ones to use the park in the winter.

On December 15, 2007, TCDOG members volunteered to assemble fence posts for a 4-foot-tall (1.2 m) fence to surround the new temporary park. The city allotted $6,000 to construct a temporary fence. Completed in early January 2008, the extended fence is still valid.
