= EPodunk =

Website

ePodunk
- Website type: media Content
- Headquarters: El Segundo, California
- Parent: Internet Brands
- Website: http://www.ePodunk.com

ePodunk was a website that profiled communities in the United States, Canada, Ireland, and the UK. It provided geocoded information that includes local museums, attractions, parks, colleges, libraries, cemeteries and other features, as well as local history and trivia. The site contained vintage postcards that its users could send online. The site became defunct as of December 2019 and its URL address re-directs to Real Estate ABC'S websites.

== History ==
The site was founded in 2001 by a team of former journalists who had worked for publications including The New York Times, Detroit Free Press, Ithaca Times, and American Demographics magazine. Initial target audiences for the site were travelers and people in the process of relocating.

Upon inception, the site listed profiles for 28,000 residential communities and focused mostly on small communities. The site has grown to cover communities of all sizes and currently lists profiles for more than 46,000 communities, including over 20,000 in the US. ePodunk was acquired by Internet Brands in 2007.

== Content ==
The site lists detailed information about residential communities on individual "Community Profile" pages. This includes items commonly found in almanacs and encyclopedias, such as resident demographics and information about parks, museums, historic sites, colleges, and schools. Information was sourced from the United States Census and other government agencies, local historical societies, publications, and non-profit and commercial organizations.

The United States version included maps and rankings of American municipalities based on the population of these communities based on ancestry and ethnicity. Maps and tables were provided for ancestry groups tracked by the United States Census Bureau, showing communities in which 1,000 or more people listed an ancestry group on the 2000 United States Census.

The site was supported by licensing content to third parties and by running advertisements.
