= William Arnold Anthony =

American physicist (1835–1908)

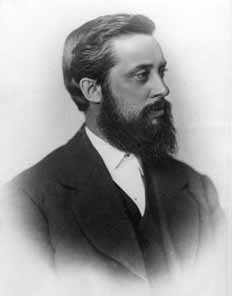
- Born: November 17, 1835; Coventry, Rhode Island, US
- Died: May 29, 1908 (aged 72); New York, New York, US
- Occupation: physicist

William Arnold Anthony (November 17, 1835 – May 29, 1908) was an American physicist.

== Biography ==
Anthony was born in Coventry, Rhode Island. He was educated at the Yale Scientific School (today Sheffield Scientific School) and graduated in 1860. Between 1857 and 1860 he was director of a grade school in Crompton, Rhode Island. From 1860 to 1861 he taught natural sciences at the Providence Conference Seminary, East Greenwich, Rhode Island, followed by a teaching position at the Delaware Literary Institute in Franklin, New York until 1867. That year he became professor of physics and chemistry at the Antioch College, where he stayed until 1870. After a short time teaching at Iowa Agricultural College, he became professor of physics at the freshly founded Cornell University, where he held a position for fifteen years (1872–1887). While at Cornell, he introduced and taught the school's electrical engineering course, one of the first in the United States.

He was a consulting electrician in Manchester, Connecticut, from 1887 to 1893. From 1893 until his death, he taught in the new day school of engineering at Cooper Union. He was the president of the AIEE from 1890-1, and a member of the American Association for the Advancement of Science.

Though primarily a teacher, Anthony invested some time in research and development. Between 1857 and 1861 he constructed two types of turbines, increasing their efficiency up to 87% by using blades based on a mathematical model derived from fluid dynamics. In 1857 he built an electrodynamic machine with a power output of 25 amps at 250 volts, as well as a galvanometer which could measure between 0.1 and 250 amps.

In 1875, while at Cornell, Arnold and student George Sylvanus Moler built a dynamo which was similar to the Gramme machine. He installed this generator in the basement of McGraw Hall, from which it which powered two electric arc lamps, one of which was located in the tower of Sage Chapel. It was said to be the "first locality in America, if not the world, to have a permanent installation of electric arc lamps." The lamps were "visible for many miles around, and it excited the wonder of the inhabitants." The machine was exhibited at the Centennial Exposition in Philadelphia in 1876.

In 1884 Anthony constructed a colossal galvanometer, two meters in diameter, capable of measuring currents up to 250 amps "with a precision hitherto unattained." It was housed in a specially-built wooden structure on the Cornell campus made "entirely free from iron."

He died at his home in Manhattan on May 29, 1908.

== Publications ==
His published papers include contributions read before these societies, and other numerous scientific articles which have appeared in the American Journal of Science, Journal of the Franklin Institute, the Popular Science Monthly, and several electrical journals. He is joint author with C. F. Brackett of an Elementary Textbook on Physics (New York, 1885), and he contributed a chapter to E. A. Thompson's Roentgen Rays and Phenomena of the Anode and Cathode (New York, 1896).
