= WINO (FM) =

WINO and WRFI
WINO: Watkins Glen, New York; WRFI: Odessa, New York; United States
- Broadcast area: Finger Lakes
- Frequencies: WINO: 91.9 MHz; WRFI: 89.7 MHz
- Branding: WRFI Community Radio for Ithaca and Watkins Glen

Programming
- Language(s): English; Spanish
- Format: community radio
- Affiliations: Pacifica Radio

Ownership
- Owner: Ithaca Community Radio, Inc.

History
- First air date: WINO: June 2012; WRFI: 2022
- Former call signs: WINO: WRFI (2008–2022)

Technical information
- Licensing authority: FCC
- Facility ID: WINO: 173670; WRFI: 172825
- Class: WINO: A; WRFI: B1
- ERP: WINO: 420 watts; WRFI: 320 watts
- HAAT: WINO: −114.0 meters (−374.0 ft); WRFI: 191.0 meters (626.6 ft)
- Transmitter coordinates: WINO: 42°23′20.2″N 76°53′25.8″W; WRFI: 42°17′42.0″N 76°37′59.0″W
- Translator(s): 88.1 W201CD (Ithaca)

Links
- Public license information: WINO: Public file; LMS; WRFI: Public file; LMS
- Webcast: Listen live
- Website: www.wrfi.org

WINO (91.9 FM), is a community radio station licensed to Watkins Glen, New York. It is simulcast with WRFI (89.7 FM) Odessa, New York, and on W201CD 88.1 MHz, licensed to Ithaca, New York. Its studios are located at the Clinton House on West Seneca Street in downtown Ithaca.

== History ==
In 2002, Ithaca Community Radio, Inc. (ICR) obtained an FCC license for a translator on 88.1 FM in Ithaca. Because translators must re-broadcast full power stations, and ICR at that time did not own one, it at first re-broadcast WEOS and then later WSQX. In October 2007, ICR applied for a full power FM license for Watkins Glen, as none were available for Ithaca proper. In June 2012, ICR completed its studios based in Clinton House in downtown Ithaca, and finally went on the air as a community owned and operated station serving Tompkins and Schuyler counties. In November 2022, the station added the frequency 89.7 FM to expand its reach throughout the Southern Finger Lakes.

== Programming ==
The station features a variety of programming during the day, including locally produced programs and programs from Pacifica Radio and others.

== Translator ==
In addition to the two main stations, WINO is relayed by an additional translator to widen its broadcast area.

Call sign	Frequency	City of license	FID	ERP (W)	Class	FCC info
W201CD	88.1 FM	Ithaca, New York	88637	245	D	LMS

== See also ==
- List of community radio stations in the United States
