= Ithaca Times =

Alternative newspaper based in Ithaca, New York

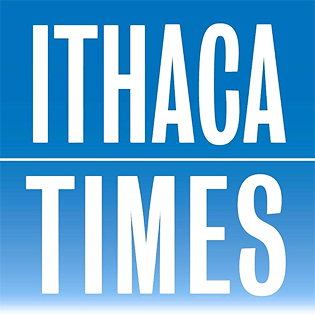
- Type: Weekly newspaper
- Format: Tabloid
- Owner: Pathways to Equity Inc.
- Founder: Jim Bilinski
- Publisher: Finger Lakes Community Newspapers
- Managing editor: Maddy Vogel (Ithaca Times); David Durrett (FLX)
- Staff writers: Lorien Tyne, Philip O'Dell
- Founded: August 31, 1972; 53 years ago
- Relaunched: 1978
- Language: English
- Headquarters: 109 N. Cayuga Street, Ithaca, New York, 14850, U.S.
- Circulation: 18,125 (as of December 2015)
- Sister newspapers: Trumansburg Free Press, News Chronicle, Interlaken Review, Ovid Gagette, Tompkins Independent
- ISSN: 0277-1187
- OCLC number: 503229354
- Website: ithaca.com

The Ithaca Times is a weekly alternative newspaper serving the Ithaca, New York area. It is a member of the Association of Alternative Newsmedia. New issues of the paper are published every Wednesday. As of December 2015, it had a circulation of 18,125.

== History ==
The newspaper was founded on August 31, 1972, originally as the Ithaca New Times.

In late 1977, the Ithaca New Times merged with the Good Times Gazette, which had been founded in 1973, to form the Ithaca Times. The first issue of the newly renamed paper was published for June 22/28, 1978, with volume and issue numbers both resetting to 1.

In May 2025, publisher Jim Bilinski retired and ownership was transferred to a newly created nonprofit called Pathways to Equity.

The Ithaca Times features a mix of modern typography, prominent cover art, and magazine-style layouts designed to highlight local culture and community issues.
