= List of New York State Historic Markers in Tompkins County, New York =

This is an incomplete list of New York State Historic Markers in Tompkins County, New York.

== Listings county-wide ==
| | Marker name | Image | Date designated | Location | City or Town | Coords | Marker text |
|---|---|---|---|---|---|---|---|
| 1 | 1ST TOWN MEETING | | | On Nys 79 About 1/2 Mile West Of Slaterville Springs | Caroline, Town Of, New York | | Held Here In Bush Taven, Made Of Hewn Logs; April 1811 William Rounsvell, Supervisor Capt. Levi Slater, Town Clerk |
| 2 | BLAIR HOMESTEAD | | | On Town Rd. About 2 Miles N. Of Speedsville | Caroline, Town Of, New York | | Birthplace Of Austin Blair Civil War Governor Of Michigan Son Of George Blair Pioneer Settler 1809 |
| 3 | CABIN SITE | | | On Nys 79 At Caroline | Caroline, Town Of, New York | | Cabin Built By Maria Earsley, 1794, For Home. First Settler In Caroline. First Trip From Roxbury, N.j. On Horseback With Son, John |
| 4 | CAMPING GROUND | | | On Nys 79 About 3/4 Mile W. Of Slaterville Springs | Caroline, Town Of, New York | | Chief Wheelock Oneida Indian Killed In Action War Of 1812 |
| 5 | DEERLICKS | | | On Nys 330 About 2 Miles East Of Brooktondale | Caroline, Town Of, New York | | On '76 Road Extension Indians And Early Settlers Here Obtained Their Salt '76 Road Built By Augustine Boyer, 1804 |
| 6 | DUTCH REFORMED | | | On Nys 79 About 1 Mile W. Of Slaterville Spgs. | Caroline, Town Of, New York | | Church Site-cemetery-1820 First Church In Caroline Built 1820-Organized 1810 By The First Dominie Rev. Garret Mandeville |
| 7 | HOME OF | | | On Nys 79 At Caroline | Caroline, Town Of, New York | | Nathaniel Tobey Who Emigrated From Bristol Co., Mass. Built Many New England Style Homes Here, 1810 |
| 8 | OLD GENUNG FARM | | | On Nys 79 About 2¼ Miles West Of Slaterville Spgs. | Caroline, Town Of, New York | | Lot 93 Was Cleared By Moses And Benjamin Genung, Brothers, New Jersey Rev. Soldiers. Cabin Built In 1800. Owned By Family 125 Yrs. |
| 9 | OLD RICH TAVERN | | | On Nys 79 About 1/2 Mile East Of Caroline | Caroline, Town Of, New York | | Built And Conducted By Captain David Rich Who Emigrated Here From Vermont 1795. Also Site Of Capt. Rich's Log Cabin |
| 10 | OLD TOBEY TAVERN | | | On Nys 79 About 1/2 Mile W. Of Caroline | Caroline, Town Of, New York | | Built 1808. Inn Keepers, George Vickory And Nathaniel Tobey. Once Tobeytown. Now Village Of Caroline |
| 11 | QUICK HOMESTEAD | | | On Nys 330 About 2½ Miles East Of Brooktondale | Caroline, Town Of, New York | | Built In 1823 By Henry Quick And Wife Sally Earsley, Who Came With First Settler From Roxbury (Montclair) New Jersey, 1794 |
| 12 | SETTLERS CABIN | | | On Nys 79, Slaterville Spgs. | Caroline, Town Of, New York | | Built By Benoni Mulks Near Spring 1798–1801 Original Fireplace Stand- Ing. Boyceville's First Settlement |
| 13 | SITE OF | | | On Nys 79 About 1½ Miles W. Of Caroline | Caroline, Town Of, New York | | Speed Blockhouse Built 1806 Of Squared Logs By John James Speed. Post Office Here 1806 Called Speedsville. Catskill Turnpike From Catskill To Bath, 1804 |
| 14 | SLATERVILLE | | | On Nys 79 At Slaterville Spgs. | Caroline, Town Of, New York | | Magnetic Mineral Springs Discovered In Valley By Dr. William C. Gallagher Who Sunk The 1St Artesian Well Here In 1871 |
| 15 | SOUTH ENTRANCE TO | | | On Co. Rd. About 1 Mile East Of Slaterville Springs | Caroline, Town Of, New York | | "Six Hundred Forest" Gorge Of Upper Six Mile Creek. Site Of Old "Bottom Mill", Sawmill Built 1808 |
| 16 | SPEEDSVILLE | | | On Co. Rd. At Speedsville | Caroline, Town Of, New York | | Commons Incorporated State Park, 1858 Laban Jenks Early Settler Built House In 1819 (On Co. Rd. At Speedsville) |
| 17 | SPRINGFARM | | | On Co. Rd. About 3/4 Mile South Of Caroline | Caroline, Town Of, New York | | Old Plantation Home Of Dr. Joseph Speed, Virginia Pioneer, 1805. Level Green Road Caroline Once Called Spencer |
| 18 | WEST OWEGO CREEK, N.W. | | | On Co. Rd. About 2½ Miles East Of Slaterville Springs | Caroline, Town Of, New York | | Boundary "Boston Purchase" 230,400 Acres Of Indian Land Ceded By New York To Mass. 1787, To Settle Boundary Dispute |
| 19 | ARROW | | | On Co. Rd. About 2 Miles South Of Ellis | Caroline, Town Of, New York | | Slave Burying Ground 45 Rods East Of This Point In Edge Of Woods Are Buries 14 Slaves Owned By Residents Of Town Of Caroline |
| 20 | NEW JERUSALEM | | | On Nys 96 About 1 Mile Southeast Of Danby | Danby, Town Of, New York | | Church Site Organized 1816, Built 1824 Founded By Dr. Lewis Beers Physician, Pastor, Justice And Pioneer Settler, 1797 |
| 21 | THIS WAS THE | | | On Nys 96 At Danby | Danby, Town Of, New York | | First Church In The Town Of Danby Organized 1807 Erected 1813 |
| 22 | 1ST BAPTIST CHURCH | | | On Co. Rd. At Etna | Dryden, Town Of, New York | | Dryden, 1830. Organized 1804 1St Church Built, 1807 Rev. John Lasure, 1St Pastor |
| 23 | BIRTHPLACE OF | | | On Co. Rd. About 1½ Miles West Of West Dryden | Dryden, Town Of, New York | | William R. "Daddy" George 1866–1936 Founder Of George Junior Republic |
| 24 | BRIDLE ROAD | | | On Nys 13 About 2¼ Miles West Of Dryden | Dryden, Town Of, New York | | Virgil To Ithaca 1795 Built By Joseph Chaplin Dryden Center House Built By Benj. Aldrich Town Meetings Held Here |
| 25 | CHARLES W. SANDERS | | | On Town Rd. At Peruville | Dryden, Town Of, New York | | 1805–1889 Author Of School Books Resided In West Dryden And Completed His "First Speller" Here |
| 26 | FIRST ROAD | | | On Co. Rd. At Malloryville | Dryden, Town Of, New York | | In Tompkins County From East. Used By Many Early Settlers. Started By Joseph Chaplin; Contractor, May 5, 1792. Completed In 1795 |
| 27 | FIRST ROAD | | | On Nys 13 About 4 Miles Northeast Of Dryden | Dryden, Town Of, New York | | In Tompkins County From East. Used By Many Early Settlers. Started By Joseph Chaplin; Contractor, May 5, 1792. Completed In 1795 |
| 28 | INDIAN CAMP | | | On Co. Rd. About 2 Miles Southeast Of Dryden | Dryden, Town Of, New York | | Hunting And Fishing Grounds On Dryden Lake. Arrows, Sinkers And Flints Abound In Great Numbers |
| 29 | JOHN MILLER | | | On Co. Rd. About 3 Miles South Of Willow Glen | Dryden, Town Of, New York | | First Governor Of North Dakota Born Here In Town Of Dryden Inaugurated 1889 |
| 30 | MALLORYVILLE | | | On Co. Rd. At Malloryville | Dryden, Town Of, New York | | Settled By Samuel Mallory In 1826 Who Operated Here Chair And Cloth Factories. Once Site Of Howe And Watson And Wade Cooperages |
| 31 | MALLORYVILLE | | | On Co. Rd. At Malloryville | Dryden, Town Of, New York | | About 1845 William Trapp Here Invented The First Successful Barrel-making Machine. Hamlet Later Became Cooperage Center |
| 32 | ONE MILE EAST ON HILL LOG CABIN | | | On Co. Rd. About 4 Miles S. Of Willow Glen | Dryden, Town Of, New York | | Site Of Birthplace John Mc Graw, 1815–1877. Donor Mc Graw Hall, Cornell University Father Of Jennie Mc Graw Fiske, Cornell Benefactress |
| 33 | UNDERGROUND | | | On Town Rd. At Etna | Dryden, Town Of, New York | | Railroad Home Of Hananiah Wilcox And Wife Nancy Ann Price Who Sheltered And Assisted Fugitive Slaves On Way To Canada |
| 34 | UNDERGROUND | | | On Town Rd. About 1/2 Mile West Of Etna | Dryden, Town Of, New York | | Railroad Home Of William Hanford And Wife Altha C. Todd, Who Sheltered Fugitive Slaves On Way To Canada And Freedom |
| 35 | ARROW | | | On Co. Rd. About 3/4 Mile West Of West Dryden | Dryden, Town Of, New York | | Wagonshed William R. George Conceived Of The Junior Republic Here. The Youthful Village Whose Motto Is "Nothing Without Labor" Was Founded July 10, 1895 |
| 36 | APPLEGATE TAVERN | | | On Nys 79 About 5 Mis. W. Of Ithaca | Enfield, Town Of, New York | | Built By John Appelgate, 1807. Settled In Town 1805. 1St Schoolhouse In Town N. Of Tavern, Erected 1809 Applegate's Corners |
| 37 | INDIAN SITE | | | On Town Rd. Along Schuyler-tompkins Co. Line About 1 Mi. N. Nys 79 | Enfield, Town Of, New York | | Early Iroquoian Village Arrows, Cracked Bones, Beads, Cooking Stones, Flint, Pieces Of Iroquoian Pottery Found |
| 38 | INDIAN VILLAGE | | | On Town Rd. Along Schuyler-tompkins Co. Line About 2 Mi. N. Nys 79 | Enfield, Town Of, New York | | Circular Palisade Around Pond. Wall South From Gate Immense Early Iroquoian Site Here The Indians Obtained Clay For Pottery |
| 39 | VAN DORN | | | On Nys 79 About 4 Mis. W. Of Ithaca | Enfield, Town Of, New York | | Tavern Site Built By Peter Van Dorn A Catskill Turnpike Milestone Stood At Van Dorn's Corners |
| 40 | WALLENBECK INN | | | On Town Rd. Along Schuyler-tompkins Co. Line About 1 Mi. S. Nys 79 | Enfield, Town Of, New York | | Route Of Catskill Turnpike First Road Built In Town. Old Post Road And Stage Route Used From Mecklenburg To Kirby's, 1826 |
| 41 | CONGREGATIONAL CHURCH | | | On Co. Rd. At West Groton | Groton, Town Of, New York | | Organized 1816, Built 1832 First Service May 3, 1833 Centennial July 16, 1916 West Gronton, N.y. |
| 42 | CUMMINGS HOME | | | On Co. Rd. About 2 Mis. S. Of Summer Hill | Groton, Town Of, New York | | Gurdon Cummings And Wife Abigail Pettis From Mansfield, Conn., Settled Here In 1810. Owned And Occupied By Four Generations Of Cummings. |
| 43 | ELM TREE INN | | | On County Rd. At Mclean | Groton, Town Of, New York | | Site Of 1St Log Tavern In Mc Lean Built By Amasa Cobb, 1796. Giant Elm Was Native Forest Sapling When Tavern Was Built |
| 44 | INDIAN VILLAGE | | | On Nys 38 About 3 Mis. S. Of Groton | Groton, Town Of, New York | | Favorite Hunting Ground Of Cayuga Indians And Other Local Tribes Near Owasco Creek |
| 45 | OLD BAPTIST | | | On Co. Rd. At Mclean | Groton, Town Of, New York | | Church-1828 Founder Rev. Benj. Whipple 1St Pastor Rev. P.l. Platt Meetings Held Since 1805 |
| 46 | OLD EAST GROTON | | | On Nys 222 About 2 Mis. E. Of Groton | Groton, Town Of, New York | | Cemetery And 1St Church Known As E. Congregational. Org. 1805. Site At Stickles Corners. Built Of Logs 1810 1St Pastor, Joshua Land, 1809 |
| 47 | OLD MILL SITE | | | On Nys 222 At Lafayette | Groton, Town Of, New York | | Lafayette Gristmill Built By George Fish, 1818 Named Same Day General Marquis De Lafayette Visited Auburn, 1825 |
| 48 | SYLVESTER PENNOYER | | | On Nys 38 At Groton | Groton, Town Of, New York | | 1831–1902 Born Here; Gov. Of Oregon 1886-94 Mayor City Of Portland, Oregon, 1896; Owner And Editor Oregon Herald, 1868–71 |
| 49 | CAYUGA INDIAN | | | On Columbia St. | Ithaca, City Of, New York | | Winter Quarters Located On Exposed Flatlands Of This Gorge Below Wells Falls |
| 50 | END OF TURNPIKE | | | At Intersection Of Aurora St. & Railroad Ave. | Ithaca, City Of, New York | | West To Old Boat Landing East Through Lansing "Enterprise" First Steamboat Launched On Lake 1820 Round Trip Two Days |
| 51 | OLD HOMESTEAD | | | On Parker Place | Ithaca, City Of, New York | | Rev. Dr. Samuel Parker And Marcus Whiteman, Planned Here In 1833 Journey Which Saved Oregon To The Union. Indian Cemetery On Estate |
| 52 | OLDEST HOUSE | | | On Linn St. | Ithaca, City Of, New York | | In Tompkins County, Built About 1800 By Abram Markle, Sold To Simeon De Witt And Used As Initial Point Of Survey For Early Turnpikes |
| 53 | ORIGINAL LANE | | | On East Buffalo St. | Ithaca, City Of, New York | | Used By First Settlers: Yaple And Dumond Near State St.; Hennepaw On Cascadilla Creek |
| 54 | OWEGO-ITHACA | | | On Nys 96, S End Ithaca | Ithaca, City Of, New York | | Turnpike, 1811–1841 R.r. Inc. 1828, Opened 1834 2Nd R.r. Chartered In State Inclined Plane 480 Ft. East |
| 55 | SIMEON DE WITT | | | On Dewitt Place | Ithaca, City Of, New York | | Home Site And Burial Place 1756–1834 Surveyor Gen. Of N.y. State. Remains Removed To Albany Rural Cemetery 1854 |
| 56 | FIRST COURT HOUSE | | 1932 | On Court St. | Ithaca, City Of, New York | | Site of First Court House. A Primitive Hall Of Justice Built Of Wood In 1818. Erection Prevented Tompkins Co. Being Reannexed To Seneca And Cayuga Counties. |
| 57 | TOLLGATE HOUSE | | | On Nys 34 At N. Bank Of Fall Creek At Lake St. Bridge | Ithaca, City Of, New York | | Once Stood Upon Road And Traffic Passed Through Owego-ithaca Turnpike Surveyed As East Road 1792 On Indian Trails |
| 58 | TURNPIKE | | | On East State St. | Ithaca, City Of, New York | | From Catskill To Bath Ran Originally Through State (Owego) St. Mail To Western Settlements Carried Over This Turnpike |
| 59 | CATSKILL | | | On Nys 79 About 1/2 Mi. W. Of Ithaca | Ithaca, Town Of, New York | | Turnpike Stage Coach Route From Catskill To Bath 1815. Old Post Road & Mail Route Between Watkins & Ithaca |
| 60 | COREORGONEL | | | On Nys 13 & 34 About 2½ Mis. S.w. Ithaca | Ithaca, Town Of, New York | | (Where We Keep Pipe Of Peace) Cayuga Indian Village Iroquois Six Nations Destroyed By Sullivan's Army September 24–25, 1779 |
| 61 | FISHER'S TAVERN | | | On Nys 13 & 34 About 2 Mis. S.w. Ithaca | Ithaca, Town Of, New York | | Jackson's Tavern And Tollgate Sites 3/10 Mile South Irish Hill Road Corduroy Until 1853 Renamed Newfield Road 1903 |
| 62 | LINDERMAN TAVERN | | | On Nys 79 About 1/2 Mi. W. Of Ithaca | Ithaca, Town Of, New York | | Built By Cornelius Linderman Settled In Town 1802 Site Of Log Cabin Panorama Of Cayuga Lake And City Of Ithaca |
| 63 | LUDLOW INN 1795 | | | On Co. Rd. At Ludlowville | Lansing, Town Of, New York | | First Log Tavern, 1792 Log Gristmill, 1795 Built By Maj. Thomas Ludlow Early Settlers—silas, Henry And Thomas Ludlow, 1791 |
| 64 | LUDLOWVILLE-MYERS | | | On Hgts. W. Of Nys 34B Between Ludlowville & Myers | Lansing, Town Of, New York | | Detachment Of Gen. John Sullivan's Army Under Col. Butler Camped On These Heights Sept. 24, 1779. Andrew Myers, Pioneer, 1791 |
| 65 | ROGUES HARBOR INN | | | At Intersection Of Nys 34 & 34B At South Lansing | Lansing, Town Of, New York | | 1830, Built By D.d. Minier Son Of Gen. Abram Minier Who Located In Town 1788 And Lived On Site 1792 Libertyville Now S. Lansing |
| 66 | CONNECTICUT HILL | | | On Tn. Rd. About 3 Mis. W. Of Trumbull Corners | Newfield, Town Of, New York | | Early Called Saxton Hill Highest Elevation (2097.2 Ft) In Tompkins County. Once Owned By State Of Connecticut |
| 67 | CONNECTICUT HILL | | | On Tn. Rd. About 3 Mis. W. Of Trumbull Corners | Newfield, Town Of, New York | | Born Here, July 22, 1855, To Forest Ervay And Wife, Four Children, Known As Ervay Quadruplets; On Exhibition For Several Years |
| 68 | ABNER TREMAN | | | On Nys 96 At Trumansburg | Ulysses, Town Of, New York | | First Settler And Founder Of Trumansburg Built His Log House Near This Spot In 1792 |
| 69 | ALGONKIAN SITE | | | In Taughannock Falls State Park | Ulysses, Town Of, New York | | Indian Village Extending From Mouth Of Creek To Falls |
| 70 | CAMP HOUSE | Camp House sign | | On Camp St., Trumansburg | Ulysses, Town Of, New York | | Built In 1848 By Herman Camp Colonel Of Cavalry Nigara Frontier War Of 1812 |
| 71 | CAMP SITE | | | In Taughannock Falls State Pk. | Ulysses, Town Of, New York | | Captain Jonathan Woodworth Revolutionary Soldier, Navigator And Surveyor With Exploring Expedition Camped Here In June 1788 |
| 72 | CAYUGA INDIAN | | | On Tn Rd. About 1/2 Mile West Of Waterbury | Ulysses, Town Of, New York | | Fort And Burial Ground Earth Work On North Side Burial Ground Opposite Circular Earth Works S.e. Bluff Supported Palisade |
| 73 | HALSEY HOUSE | | | On Nys 96 At Halseyville | Ulysses, Town Of, New York | | Built 1829 By Nicholl Halsey First Settler & Founder Of Halseyville |
| 74 | OLD COOPER INN | | | On Nys 96 At Jacksonville | Ulysses, Town Of, New York | | Built By Thomas Cooper, 1823 Pioneer Settler, 1799 Ithaca-geneva Turnpike State Coach Route And Post Road, 1811 |
| 75 | SAMUEL WEYBURN | | | In Taughannock Falls State Pk. | Ulysses, Town Of, New York | | Settled Here In 1790 The Hospitality Of His Log Cabin Home Saved Life Of Abner Treman, Rev. Soldier Caught In Blizzard 1793-4 |
| 76 | FIRST METHODIST | | 2019 | Corner of Court St. and N. Aurora St. | Ithaca, NY | | First Methodist. On May 10, 1819 Simeon Dewitt deeded this site to the First Methodist Episcopal Society to Build a Church. William C. Pomeroy Foundation 2019. |
| 77 | ORIGINAL LANE | | 1932 | Corner of Buffalo St. and Terrace Place | Ithaca, NY | | Original Lane. Used by first settlers: Yaple and dumond near State St; Nennepaw on Cascadilla Creek. |
| 78 | R.A. MOOG COMPANY | R.A. Moog sign | | East Main St (NYS 96) near corner of Elm in Trumansburg | Ulysses, Town Of, New York | | At this site in 1964, innovator Robert Moog developed and produced the first commercial modular synthesizer, changing the course of music history. |
| 79 | BAPTIST CHURCH | Baptist Church sign | | McLallen St near corner of Bradley in Trumansburg | Ulysses, Town Of, New York | | Designed and constructed in 1851 by Daniel Elmore, minister & carpenter. Housed 2nd Baptist Church and Society of Ulysses. |
| 80 | HERMANN BIGGS, M.D. | Hermann Biggs sign | | Congress St near corner of McLallen in Trumansburg | Ulysses, Town Of, New York | | Born here in 1859. Renowned public health leader, preventive medicine pioneer & NYS Health Commissioner. Knighted by the King of Spain. |
| 81 | WILLIAM AUSTIN | William Austin sign | | Seneca St near corner of Bradley in Trumansburg | Ulysses, Town Of, New York | | 1. 1832-1909. Edited abolitionist Kansas newspaper. Recruiter & Second Lt. during Civil War. Local Lawyer. Lived here ca. 1869 until his death. |
| | Benjamin Joy | | 2025 | 155 Ludlowville Rd, Lansing, NY | Lansing, Town Of, New York | 42.55265562722, -76.537512585893 | BENJAMIN JOY 1800-1869. LED NYS MOVEMENTS FOR ABOLITION & TEMPERANCE. KEPT STATION ON UNDERGROUND RAILROAD IN LUDLOWVILLE. LIVED ON THIS PROPERTY. WILLIAM G. POMEROY FOUNDATION 2025 |
| | Peter Wheeler | | 2020 | 171 Ludlowville Rd, Lansing, NY | Lansing, Town Of, New York | 42.553769, -76.537267 | PETER WHEELER BORN 1789 IN NJ. KIDNAPPED, SOLD AS SLAVE & BROUGHT TO LUDLOWVILLE 1801. FLED 1806 WITH HELP OF ABOLITIONISTS THOMAS & HENRY LUDLOW. WILLIAM G. POMEROY FOUNDATION 2020 |

== See also ==
- List of New York State Historic Markers
- National Register of Historic Places listings in New York
- List of National Historic Landmarks in New York
