= County Route 115 (Tompkins County, New York) =

County route in New York

County Route 115
- Map of Tompkins County and vicinity with CR 115 highlighted in red and pink (former NY 330 backed in pink) and CR 115M in blue

Route information
- Maintained by Tompkins County Highway Division
- Length: 12.91 mi (20.78 km)

Major junctions
- South end: CR 33 at the Tioga County line in Caroline
- North end: NY 79 in Dryden

Location
- Country: United States
- State: New York
- County: Tompkins

Highway system
- County routes in New York; County Routes in Tompkins County
| ← NY 329 | NY 330 | → NY 331 |

County Route 115 (CR 115) is a northwest–southeast county highway located mostly within the town of Caroline in Tompkins County, New York, in the United States. It extends for 12.8 miles (20.6 km) from the Tioga County line south of the hamlet of Speedsville to an intersection with New York State Route 79 (NY 79) just north of the Caroline town line in the town of Dryden. The highway continues into Tioga County as CR 33. The portion of CR 115 north of the hamlet of Guide Board Corners was originally designated as New York State Route 330 and maintained by the state of New York. NY 330 existed from the early 1930s to 1980, when ownership and maintenance of the highway was transferred to Tompkins County.

== Route description ==
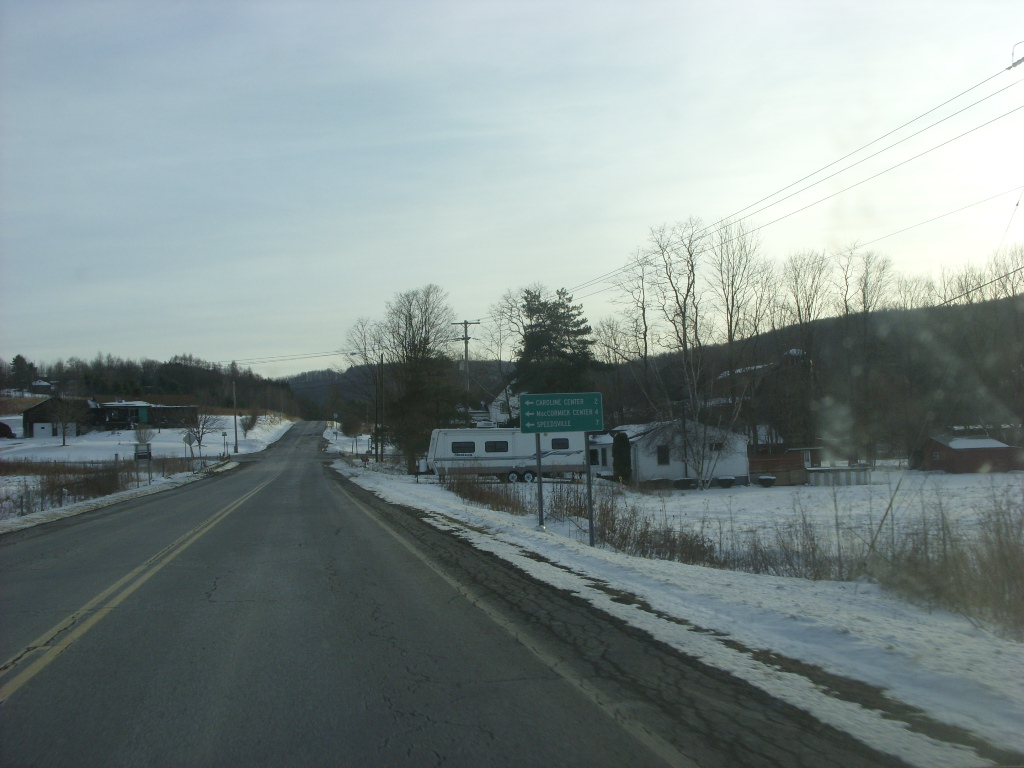
CR 115 at the intersection with 76 Road in Guide Board Corners. This was the southern terminus of NY 330 prior to 1980.

CR 115 begins at the Tioga County line in the town of Caroline, where it connects to Tioga County's CR 33. The county highway passes a mountain to the west and the Owego River's west branch to the east as it heads northward. It crosses Boyer Creek as 76 Road and enters the hamlet of Speedsville, a small community located on top of a mountain. Here, CR 115 turns to the northwest to run along the base of a valley surrounding Boyer Creek. The creek reaches its source at an intersection with Yaple Road; however, CR 115 continues northwestward to serve the hamlet of Caroline Center.

Outside of Caroline Center, CR 115 heads northwestward through a small valley to the community of Guide Board Corners. In the center of the hamlet, CR 115 turns north off 76 Road to follow Central Chapel Road. The highway emerges from the valley 1 mile (1.6 km) north of Guide Board Corners, at which point it meets CR 114, a connector to NY 79, and curves westward as Valley Road. CR 115 parallels the Sixmile Creek into the hamlet of Brooktondale, where it changes names once more to become Brooktondale Road. From Brooktondale, the route heads northwest alongside Sixmile Creek into the town of Dryden, where it ends at an intersection with NY 79.

== History ==
=== Origins ===
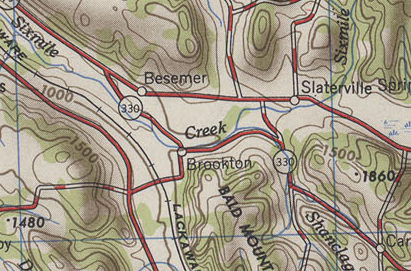
USGS topo showing NY 330

In the early 19th century, construction commenced on a highway connecting the Catskill Turnpike (modern NY 79) to the hamlet of Speedsville near the Tioga County line. It began at Boiceville (known today as West Slaterville) and passed through the communities of Guide Board Corners and Caroline Center on its way to Speedsville. The roadway was built by community labor during the summers of 1804 through 1808 and was named "76 Road". According to the Bicentennial history of the Town of Caroline, the name refers to the Revolutionary War:

The first bee for cutting the road through was held near Augustine Boyer's on 4 July 1804. It was opened and dedicated ... by the settlers on July 4, 1808. Mr. Boyer was requested to name the road. He replied that he would name it the " '76 Road". Mr. Boyer explained that he had spent seven days obtaining the services of the commissioners and surveyors to lay out the road, and these days were representative of the seven years of the Revolutionary struggle, and since the day was 4 July, and the spirit of '76 was in the air, and other spirits in their bottles, he would give the name of " '76 Road" in honor of the spirit of cooperation and dedication that the people had in working together on the project, and to honor the memory of those who worked together in laying the foundations of our country in 1776.

— Caroline Historical Society, A History of the Town of Caroline, Tompkins County, New York, United States of America

In the early 1910s, the state of New York upgraded a local highway connecting the Catskill Turnpike near the hamlet of Besemer to Brookton (now Brooktondale). It was added to the state highway system on November 4, 1914. The state also intended on improving an extension of the roadway east to 76 Road and 76 Road itself from the modern junction of Boiceville, Valley, and Central Chapel Roads south to Speedsville; however, construction advanced no farther southeastward than Guide Board Corners. The Brookton–Guide Board Corners highway was added to the state highway system on February 8, 1921.

The Besemer–Guide Board Corners state highway was designated as NY 330 c. 1931.

=== Reconstruction ===
New York State Route 330
- Location: Caroline–Dryden
- Length: 5.24 mi (8.43 km)
- Existed: c. 1931–1980

By 1962, the design of NY 330 became antiquated. Despite attempts to rebuild the road, the winter decimated the structure of the highway and made trouble for local emergency authorities. The New York Department of Public Works' State Highway Department designed a new road that would be 20 feet (6.1 m) wide with 6-foot (1.8 m) shoulders from Guideboard Corners to Cooks Corners (NY 79). This road, making concessions to demolish as little private property as possible, made several 10% curves, the legal maximum. In order to go ahead with the rebuild, two barns, an abandoned mill and a house would have to be demolished. The job would also take out 300 trees in Brooktondale and the area surrounding the hamlet, leaving the state highway with 287 trees.

Opponents in Brooktondale to the construction felt the removal of trees would ruin the village. Feeling that the village of Brooktondale was not likely to grow in population as a result of this project, they questioned its purpose. Ruining the scenic narrative of the area would be a waste of taxpayer dollars, since the road just ends at two dirt roads in Guideboard Corners. Despite the opposition, the state met with Caroline town officials and they noted that about 20 people were opposed to the project while a petition of 547 people supporting the job existed. In early July 1962, the state gave the go-ahead for the project to begin, but that the job would begin as early as 1963.

Despite the support, the state caved to some of the complaints of the opposition, resulting in a delay of the project. By November 1963, the state told Caroline officials that the design of bridges along NY 330 required changing to new state highway standards. The state began working also on assessing property values of the land required for the new position. They stated that unless the state budget could not afford it, the project would begin the process in 1964. Patience ran thin by February 1964 with the Caroline town officials, who demanded progress from the state, who stated that the project could not move forward until there was funding. By November 1964, the state admitted nothing would happen until at least 1965, two years behind schedule. This time, the construction would be delayed due to delays in acquiring land and personnel.

In May 1965, the state announced that the project would finally go out for bids on June 17. The project was now amended to work on bridges over Six Mile and Boice creeks. The reconstruction project would cost an estimated amount of $1.24 million (1965 USD). On June 17, the state announced that a bid was accepted from the William E. Bouley company of Auburn, the only firm to bid on the job. Their cost was $1.022 million with a slated completion date of July 20, 1967. Construction began quickly, with NY 330's pavement being torn up by August. That month, workers also began uprooting and moving trees in the right-of-way of the new roadway. After being closed off in November 1965, the new bridge in Brooktondale began to come together by March 1966

The project ran ahead of schedule and by November 1966, work was almost completed on the reconstruction. The project was completely finished in December 1966, eight months ahead of the July 20, 1967 deadline.

=== Decommissioning ===
The NY 330 designation was removed on January 24, 1980, and ownership and maintenance of its former routing was transferred from the state of New York to Tompkins County on April 1, 1980, as part of a highway maintenance swap between the two levels of government. By 1994, NY 330's former routing was designated as part of CR 115, which continued south from Guide Board Corners to Speedsville via 76 Road.

In late June 2006, the Tompkins County Highway Division temporarily closed off 76 Road (CR 115) from Central Chapel Road to Caroline Center due to underground damage caused by heavy rains. Vehicular traffic weighing more than 5 short tons (4,500 kg) was detoured at Speedsville to follow West Creek Road to NY 79 while traffic weighing less than 5 tons was directed onto Buffalo Hill Road at Caroline Center.

== CR 115M ==
CR 115M is a spur route of CR 115 in the vicinity of Speedsville. It is named Mill Road and connects CR 115 in Speedsville to the Tioga County line, where it becomes CR 33 and changes names to West Creek Road.

== Major intersections ==
The entire route is in Tompkins County.

| Location | mi | km | Destinations | Notes |
|---|---|---|---|---|
| Caroline | 0.00 | 0.00 | CR 33 south | Continuation into Tioga County |
| Caroline | 8.78 | 14.13 | CR 114 (Boiceville Road) | Southern terminus of CR 114 |
| Brooktondale | 10.28 | 16.54 | CR 113 (White Church Road) | |
| Brooktondale | 10.73 | 17.27 | CR 113A north (Perkins Valley Road) | Southern terminus of CR 113A |
| Caroline | 11.52 | 18.54 | CR 175 north (Besemer Road) | Southern terminus of CR 175 |
| Town of Dryden | 12.91 | 20.78 | NY 79 (Slaterville Road) | Northern terminus |
1.000 mi = 1.609 km; 1.000 km = 0.621 mi
