= St. Thomas Episcopal Church =

St. Thomas Episcopal Church, and variations with St. Thomas' or St. Thomas's, may refer to:

In the United States (by state):

- St. Thomas Episcopal Church (Alamosa, Colorado)
- St. Thomas Episcopal Church (Denver, Colorado), a Denver Landmark
- St. Thomas Episcopal Church (Newark, Delaware)
- St. Thomas Episcopal Church (Sioux City, Iowa)
- St. Thomas Episcopal Church (Beattyville, Kentucky)
- St. Thomas Episcopal Church (Taunton, Massachusetts)
- St. Thomas Episcopal Church (Dover, New Hampshire)
- St. Thomas Episcopal Church (Glassboro, New Jersey)
- St. Thomas Episcopal Church (Pittstown, New Jersey)
- St. Thomas Episcopal Church (Amenia Union, New York)
- St. Thomas' Episcopal Church Complex (Mamaroneck, New York)
- St. Thomas Episcopal Church (New Windsor, New York)
- Saint Thomas Church (Manhattan), New York City, New York, an Episcopal church
- St. Thomas Episcopal Church (Slaterville Springs, New York)
- St. Thomas Episcopal Church (Bath, North Carolina)
- St. Thomas Episcopal Church (Port Clinton, Ohio)
- St. Thomas Episcopal Church (Terrace Park, Ohio)
- St. Thomas' Episcopal Church (Canyon City, Oregon)
- African Episcopal Church of St. Thomas, Philadelphia, Pennsylvania
- St. Thomas Episcopal Church (Middletown, Virginia)
- St. Thomas’ Episcopal Church, Whitemarsh

== See also ==
- St. Thomas' Church (disambiguation)
