= West Danby, New York =

- Census-designated place
- Location within New York Location within the United States
- Coordinates: 42°19′8″N 76°31′31″W
- Country: United States
- State: New York
- County: Tompkins
- Town: Danby

Area
  - Total: 1.37 sq mi (3.55 km^{2})
  - Land: 1.37 sq mi (3.54 km^{2})
  - Water: 0.0039 sq mi (0.01 km^{2})
- Elevation: 940 ft (290 m)

Population (2020)
  - Total: 211
  - Density: 154.5/sq mi (59.66/km^{2})
- Time zone: UTC-5 (Eastern (EST))
  - Summer (DST): UTC-4 (EDT)
- ZIP Code: 14883 (West Danby); 14867 (Newfield)
- Area code: 607
- FIPS code: 36-79697
- GNIS feature ID: 2806986

West Danby is a hamlet and census-designated place (CDP) in the town of Danby, Tompkins County, New York, United States. It was first listed as a CDP prior to the 2020 census. As of the 2020 census, West Danby had a population of 211.

The community is in southern Tompkins County, on the west side of the town of Danby. It is bordered to the west by the town of Newfield. New York State Routes 34 and 96 run together through the center of the hamlet, leading north 10 miles (16 km) to Ithaca and south 8 miles (13 km) to Spencer.

West Danby is on the west side of the deep valley of Cayuga Inlet, which runs north to Cayuga Lake at Ithaca.

== Public utilities ==
West Danby is currently not served by any natural gas connections, and relies on the delivery of propane or other home heating fuel oils. Most of the hamlet is served by a public municipal water system serving approximately 150 customers.

Historical population
Census	Pop.	Note	%±
2020	211		—
U.S. Decennial Census

== Education ==
The CDP is in the Newfield Central School District.
