= William Hale House =

Historic house in New Hampshire, United States

- U.S. National Register of Historic Places
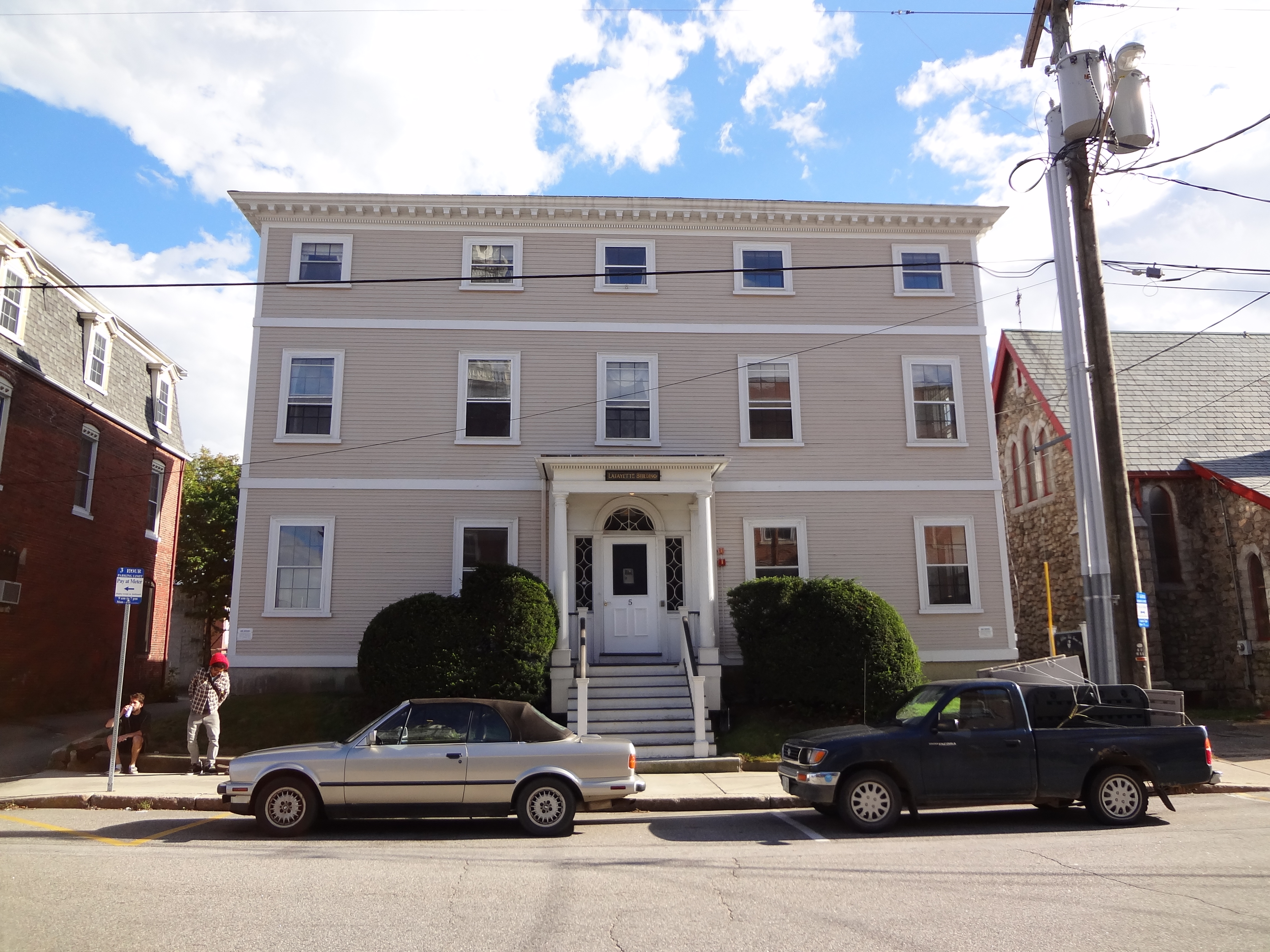

- Location within New Hampshire Location within the United States
- Location: 5 Hale St., Dover, New Hampshire
- Coordinates: 43°11′37″N 70°52′30″W
- Area: less than one acre
- Built: 1806
- Architect: Johnson, Bradbury; Pendexter, George,& Edward
- Architectural style: Federal
- NRHP reference No.: 80000309
- Added to NRHP: November 18, 1980

The William Hale House is a historic house at 5 Hale Street in Dover, New Hampshire. Built in 1806, it is one of the few early houses in southeastern New Hampshire for which the architect is known with certainty. It is also the only definitively known work of that architect, Bradbury Johnson, who had a reputation for craftsmanship across the state's Seacoast Region. The house was listed on the National Register of Historic Places in 1980. It presently serves as the parish house for the adjacent St. Thomas Episcopal Church.

== Description and history ==
The William Hale House is located on the south side of Hale Street, opposite Dover City Hall and just east of St. Thomas Episcopal Church. It is a three-story wood-frame structure set close to the street, five bays wide, whose third floor windows are smaller than those on the lower floors. The center entry is sheltered by a modest portico supported by Doric columns and matching pilasters. At the back of the house is a modern parish hall, which physically connects the house to the adjacent church.

The house was built in 1806 for William Hale by Bradbury Johnson, a noted local builder-designer of the period. William Hale was a successful merchant, and this house was one of the finest of the Federal era in Dover. The house was originally located nearer the center, on the site where Dover City Hall now stands, overlooking the waterfront where Hale owned a wharf. In 1890 it was moved to its present location after the city took the land by eminent domain. The property was purchased by the church from Hale's descendants in 1901.

== See also ==
- National Register of Historic Places listings in Strafford County, New Hampshire
