= Danby, New York =

- Town
- Location within the state of New York
- Coordinates: 42°20′15″N 76°28′22″W
- Country: United States
- State: New York
- County: Tompkins

Area
  - Total: 53.78 sq mi (139.28 km^{2})
  - Land: 53.55 sq mi (138.70 km^{2})
  - Water: 0.22 sq mi (0.58 km^{2})
- Elevation: 1,532 ft (467 m)

Population (2020)
  - Total: 3,457 ▲
  - Estimate (2021): 3,423
  - Density: 66.0/sq mi (25.49/km^{2})
- Time zone: UTC-5 (Eastern (EST))
  - Summer (DST): UTC-4 (EDT)
- FIPS code: 36-19620
- GNIS feature ID: 0978882

Danby is a town in Tompkins County, New York, United States. The population was 3,457 at the 2020 census. The town is in the southern part of the county and is south of the city of Ithaca.

== History ==
The Cayuga people, one of the Six Nations of the Haudenosaunee, occupied the land at the head of Cayuga Lake for centuries. Indigenous peoples were largely forced out of Upstate New York by the Sullivan-Clinton Expedition in 1779. The land that would become the Town of Danby was a part of the Watkins and Flint Purchase, a 336,380 acre patent granted by New York State to numerous eastern investors in 1794. Danby's first European-American settlers, including Isaac and John Dumond and Jacob and Joseph Yaple, arrived in 1795.

The town of Danby was created from the town of Spencer on February 22, 1811. Danby was part of Tioga County until 1822 when it was annexed by Tompkins County. In 1839, a part of the town of Caroline was added to Danby, and part of Danby was lost to the town of Dryden in 1856.

The Ithaca-Owego Turnpike was completed through Danby in 1811, connecting Cayuga Lake with the Susquehanna River. Today, Route 96B generally follows the same route and continues to provide an important connection between Ithaca and Binghamton and communities downstate.

== Notable people ==
- Prince and Lement Duplex, African American Revolutionary War veteran and his wife who moved to Danby from Connecticut in 1811
- William Grant Egbert, violinist and founder of the Ithaca Conservatory of Music in 1892, which would later become Ithaca College, was born in Danby
- Wilson Greatbatch, engineer and inventor from Buffalo, who held more than 325 patents, lived in Danby during his education at Cornell University in the late 1940s
- Samuel Parker, presbyterian minister who was ordained at the Danby Federated Church in 1812; author of Parker's Exploring Tour Beyond the Rocky Mountains, an account of his 1835 trip to the Pacific Northwest

== Geography ==
Tompkins County is often included in the Finger Lakes Region of New York State, but is sometimes included in the Southern Tier Region. The physical geography of Danby mirrors this duality as the drainage divide between the Susquehanna River and Lake Ontario runs across the town. Generally, waters in the northern and western portions of the town flow north into Cayuga Lake, Lake Ontario, and the St. Lawrence River, while waters in the southeastern portion of the town flow south into the Susquehanna River and Chesapeake Bay.

Danby is situated along the northern edge of the Allegheny Plateau, part of the Appalachian Mountains. The town is characterized by three primary land forms:

- The deep north-south valley of Cayuga Inlet in the western part of the town
- The western slopes of the Sixmile Creek valley in the northeastern part of the town
- A highland plateau in the central portion of the town rising in the north to Ithaca's South Hill and narrowing in the south into the valley of Willseyville Creek

Elevations range from approximately 450 feet above sea level where Cayuga Inlet crosses the northern town line, to about 1230 feet at Town Hall in Danby Hamlet, to just over 1800 feet at Dawes Hill in the southwestern part of the town and Roundtop in the southeastern part of the town. The dramatic hill and valley lands of Danby have sometimes been referred to as the 'Danby Highlands'.

According to the United States Census Bureau, the town has a total area of 53.8 square miles (139 km^{2}), of which 53.6 square miles (139 km^{2}) is land and 0.2 square miles (0.52 km^{2}) (0.33%) is water.

== Demographics ==
Historical population
Census	Pop.	Note	%±
1820	2,001		—
1830	2,481		24.0%
1840	2,570		3.6%
1850	2,411		−6.2%
1860	2,261		−6.2%
1870	2,126		−6.0%
1880	2,035		−4.3%
1890	1,707		−16.1%
1900	1,449		−15.1%
1910	1,235		−14.8%
1920	1,143		−7.4%
1930	1,407		23.1%
1940	1,253		−10.9%
1950	1,555		24.1%
1960	2,059		32.4%
1970	2,141		4.0%
1980	2,449		14.4%
1990	2,858		16.7%
2000	3,007		5.2%
2010	3,329		10.7%
2020	3,457		3.8%
2021 (est.)	3,423	▼	−1.0%
U.S. Decennial Census

As of the census of 2010, there were 3,007 people, 1,187 households, and 830 families residing in the town. There were 1,264 housing units at an average density of 23.6 per square mile (9.1/km^{2}). The racial makeup of the town as 93.65% White, 2.69% African American, 0.17% Native American, 1.06% Asian, 0.43% from other races, and 2.00% from two or more races. Hispanic or Latino of any race were 1.70% of the population.

There were 1,187 households, out of which 33.8% had children under the age of 18 living with them, 56.6% were married couples living together, 8.7% had a female householder with no husband present, and 30.0% were non-families. 21.2% of all households were made up of individuals, and 5.0% had someone living alone who was 65 years of age or older. The average household size was 2.53 and the average family size was 2.94.

In the town, the population was spread out, with 24.5% under the age of 18, 6.7% from 18 to 24, 30.0% from 25 to 44, 28.9% from 45 to 64, and 9.9% who were 65 years of age or older. The median age was 40 years. For every 100 females, there were 103.5 males. For every 100 females age 18 and over, there were 98.2 males.

The median income for a household in the town was $50,348, and the median income for a family was $52,303. Males had a median income of $34,181 versus $30,136 for females. The per capita income for the town was $23,078. About 3.9% of families and 5.1% of the population were below the poverty line, including 5.0% of those under age 18 and 2.8% of those age 65 or over.

== Communities and locations in Danby ==
- Danby - a hamlet in the central part of the town
- West Danby - a hamlet in the southwestern part of the town
- South Danby - a small hamlet in the southeastern section of the town
- Caroline Depot - an area in the northeastern part of the town, on the border with Caroline, that was a hamlet in the 19th and early 20th centuries
- Jennings Pond - a portion of Buttermilk Falls State Park located in the central part of the town, near Danby hamlet
- Point O' Rocks – a location in Danby State Forest, near the intersection of Michigan Hollow and Bald Hill Road
- Bald Hill - an area in the central part of the town, between Danby and West Danby hamlets, that was a community in the 19th and early 20th centuries. This area is now part of Danby State Forest.
- White Hawk – An ecovillage that is to the south of Ithaca.

== Transportation ==
New York State Route 96B (Danby Road) runs north-south through the central portion of the town, generally along the route of the 1811 Ithaca-Owego Turnpike.

New York State Routes 34/96 runs north-south through the western portion of the town, through the valley of the Cayuga Inlet.

A Norfolk Southern Railway branch line between Sayre, PA and Ludlowville, NY runs through the western portion of the town, through the valley of the Cayuga Inlet. This railroad was built in 1871 as the Ithaca & Athens Railroad and later become part of the Lehigh Valley Railroad. There was a depot in West Danby, on the north side of Station Road, east of the tracks. Passenger service to West Danby ended in the 1940s and passenger service on this line ended in 1961.

A former branch line of the Delaware, Lackawanna, and Western Railroad ran across the far northeastern part of the town, along the border with the Town of Caroline. This was originally built in 1834 as the Ithaca and Owego Railroad, one of the first in the United States. The line originally included two inclined planes to descend into Ithaca. These were rebuilt as a switchback railroad and leased to the DL&W in 1855. The line was abandoned in 1956.

The Finger Lakes Trail crosses the town east-west through the Danby State Forest.
