= St. John's Episcopal Church (Speedsville, New York) =

Historic church in New York, United States

- U.S. National Register of Historic Places
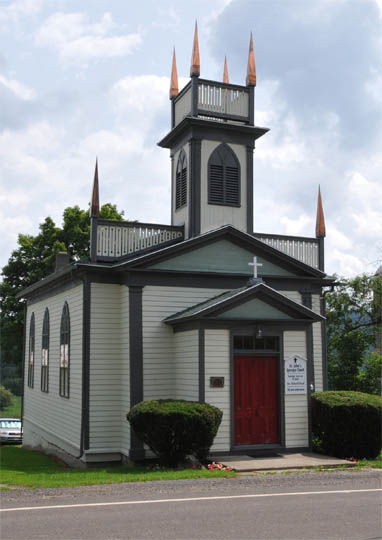

- Location within New York Location within the United States
- Location: 1504 Seventy Six Rd., Speedsville, New York
- Coordinates: 42°18′10″N 76°15′16″W
- Built: 1832
- Architectural style: Federal
- MPS: Historic Churches of the Episcopal Diocese of Central New York MPS
- NRHP reference No.: 00001407
- Added to NRHP: November 22, 2000

St. John's Episcopal Church is a historic Episcopal church located at Speedsville in Tompkins County, New York. It is timber framed, clapboard-sheathed Federal-style structure built about 1832. It is a three-by-four-bay building and the front facade features a one-stage square belfry. A recessed chancel and service room were added in 1885.

It was listed on the National Register of Historic Places in 2000.
