= Guide Board Corners, New York =

- Hamlet
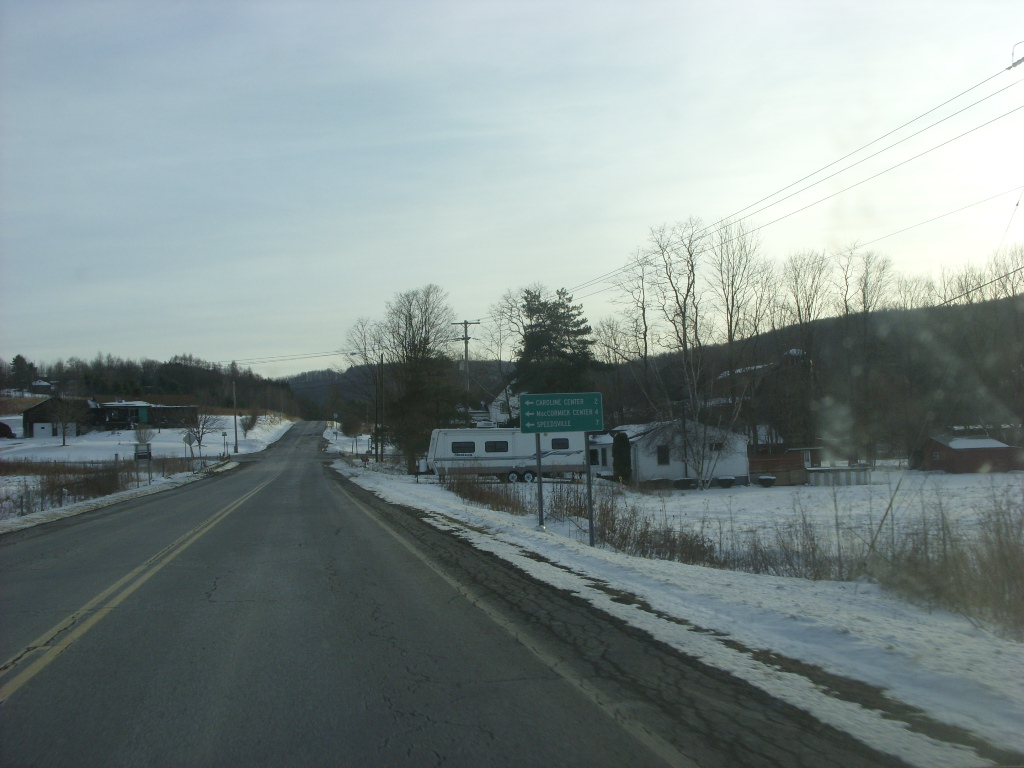
- County Route 115 at the intersection with the Old 76 Road in Guide Board Corners. Before 1980, this was the southern terminus of NY 330

- Location within the state of New York
- Coordinates: 42°22′13″N 76°21′11″W
- Country: United States
- State: New York
- County: Tompkins

Government
  - Supervisor: Don Barber (politician) (for town of Caroline)
- Time zone: UTC-5 (Eastern (EST))
  - Summer (DST): UTC-4 (EDT)
- Website: http://www.townofcaroline.org

Guide Board Corners is a hamlet in the town of Caroline, New York in the United States. The location is situated at the intersection of Central Chapel Road, Grove School Road, and Seventy-Six Road (most of which is Tompkins County Route 115). Although the United States Census does not have a listing for the population of Guide Board Corners, the town of which it is located, town of Caroline, has a population of 2,910 (2000 Census). The education for the residents of the location go to either the schools in nearby Brooktondale, or into districts of other nearby cities/villages.

== History ==
The area around Caroline was first part of nearby Tioga County, New York, until 1817, when Tompkins County was created and took over the area, which included Guide Board Corners. The location got its name from early settlers in the town of Caroline due to the guide signs once located at the intersections of Seventy-six Road and Central Chapel Road.

== Education ==
As with most of the town of Caroline, Guide Board Corner's students are sent to schools either in Caroline itself, or in other districts. These other districts include Dryden, Candor, Ithaca, and Newark Valley.

== Transportation ==
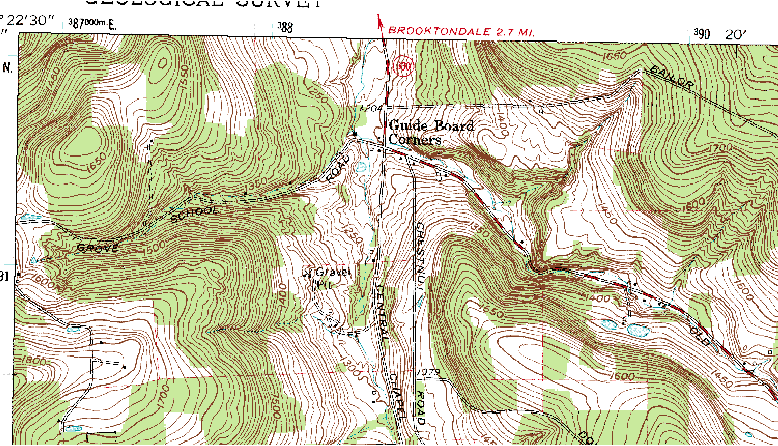
United States Geological Survey 1976 map of Guide Board Corners

Guide Board Corners is accessible by several different roads leading from other parts of the town. The most major of these is Central Chapel Road (part of County Route 115), which runs from north to south through the center of Guide Board Corners. This road provides access to Brooktondale and Slaterville, which are near New York State Route 79. Central Chapel Road, where it comes to the large intersection, was once part of New York State Route 330, which ran from Guide Board Corners to Besemer (at NY 79). Heading southward out of Guide Board Corners along Central Chapel Road brings you to Brearley Hill. The road leading west out of Guide Board Corners is Grove School Road, which heads westward, ending at an intersection with Bald Hill Road. Although the road goes only for a short distance, it has a history dating back to 1972, when the remains of Hurricane Agnes struck the area. The road was closed due to major flooding and damaged bridges. However, according to Tompkins County officials, the roads were "generally awful all over". Middaugh Road and NY 79 were also closed off due to Agnes. The last major road in Guide Board Corners is the Seventy-six Road. This highway, part of County Route 115, heads from Speedsville and the Tioga County line all the way to Guide Board Corners. This section was built in 1804–1808 as "76 Road", often corrupted in popular speech to "Old 76 Road".

== See also ==
- County Route 115 (Tompkins County, New York)
- List of places in New York: G
