= District No. 2 School, Caroline and Dryden =

- U.S. National Register of Historic Places
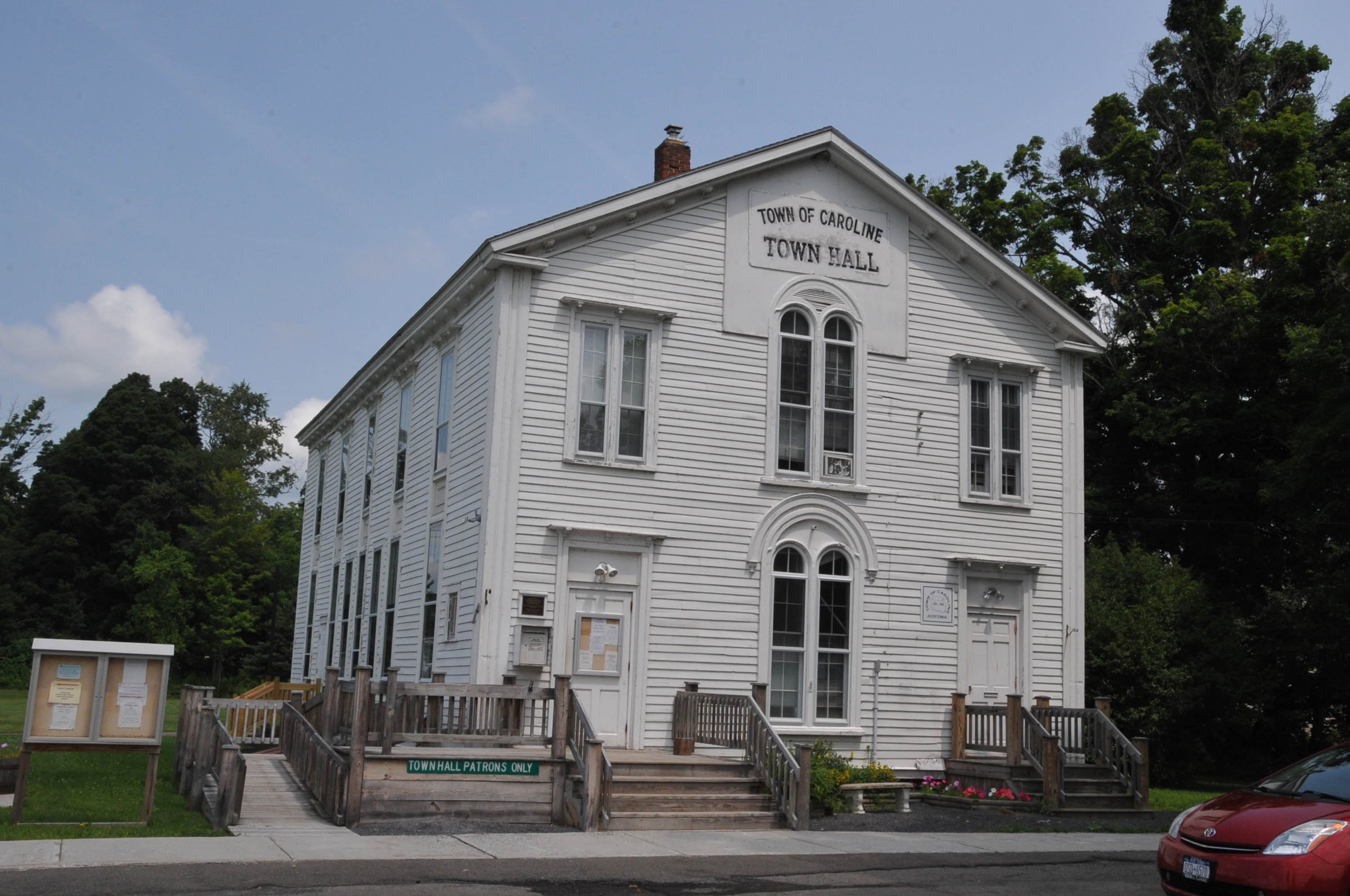

- Location within New York Location within the United States
- Location: 2670 Slaterville Rd., Slaterville Springs, New York
- Coordinates: 42°23′40″N 76°21′0″W
- Area: 0.6 acres (0.24 ha)
- Built: 1869
- Architectural style: Romanesque
- NRHP reference No.: 04001453
- Added to NRHP: January 5, 2005

District No. 2 School, Caroline and Dryden, now Caroline Town Hall, is a historic school building located at Slaterville Springs in Tompkins County, New York. It was built in 1869 and is a two-story, 30 feet (9.1 m) wide by 50 feet (15 m) deep, frame structure with a partial basement. The first floor housed grades one through eight, while the second floor accommodated high school classes. The building was used as a school until 1957 and is now used as the town hall.

It was listed on the National Register of Historic Places in 2005.
