= District Number 7 School =

- U.S. National Register of Historic Places
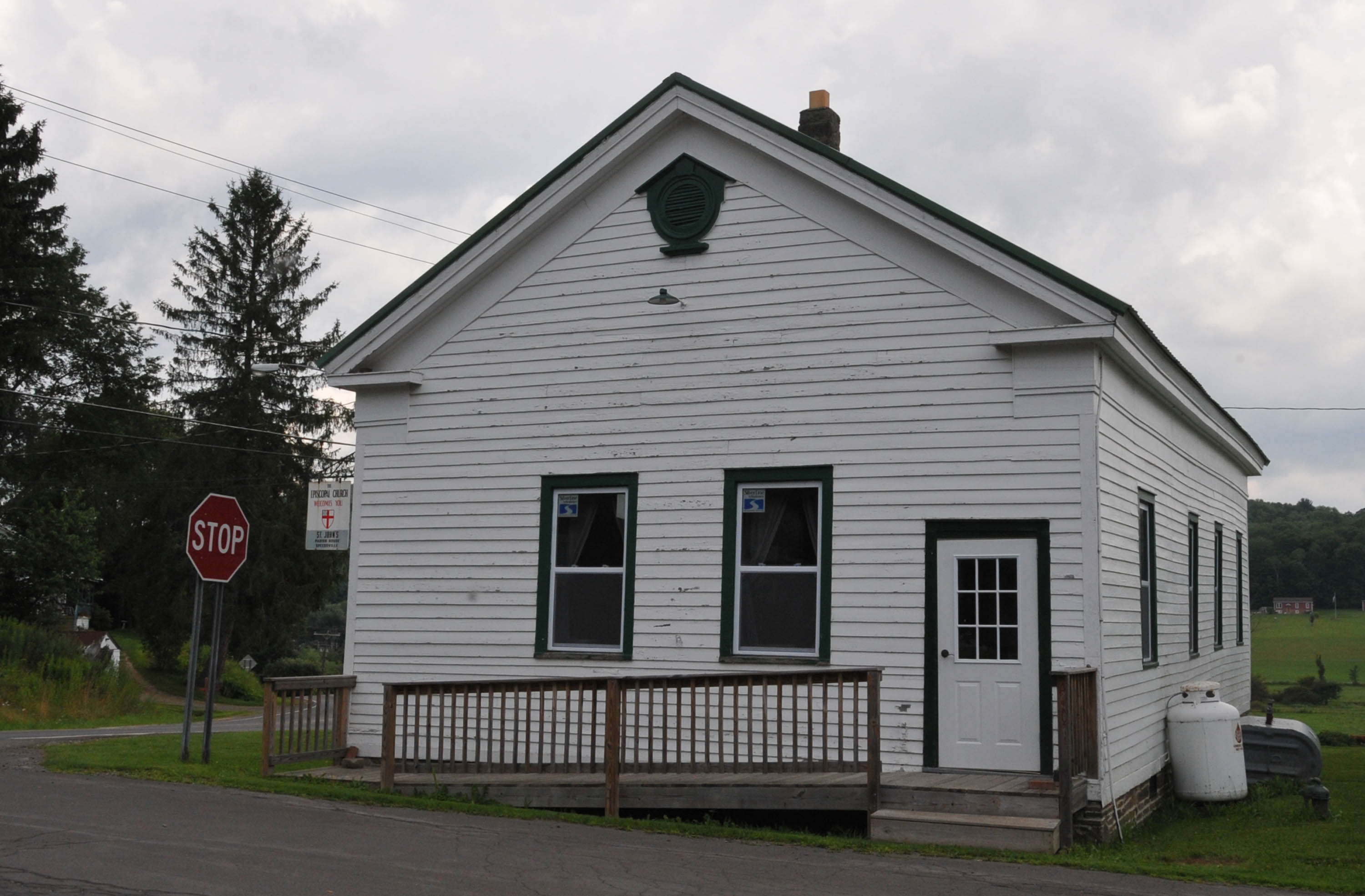

- Location within New York Location within the United States
- Location: Mill Rd. at the Park, Speedsville, New York
- Coordinates: 42°18′15″N 76°15′12″W
- Area: less than one acre
- Built: 1850
- Architectural style: Greek Revival
- NRHP reference No.: 04000701
- Added to NRHP: November 30, 2004

District Number 7 School, also known as Speedsville School, is a historic one room school building located at Speedsville in Tompkins County, New York, U.S.A. It was built about 1850 and is a one-story, 30 feet wide by 50 feet deep, frame structure. The building was used as a school until 1956 and is now a Sunday school and community center for the adjacent St. John's Episcopal Church.

It was listed on the National Register of Historic Places in 2004.
