= Charles R. Gleason =

American politician

Charles R. Gleason (September 8, 1830 – October 4, 1907) was an American businessman and politician.

Gleason was born in Caroline, Tompkins County, New York. He went to the Tompkins County public schools. In 1849, Gleason, his wife, and his parents moved to Kingston, Wisconsin. In 1856, they moved to Eau Claire, Wisconsin. Gleason was in the lumber and banking business. He was also a merchant and owned a general store in Eau Claire. Gleason was a Democrat. Gleason served as president of the village of Eau Claire. In 1870, Gleason served in the Wisconsin Assembly. From 1872 to 1879, Gleason served as the first city clerk for Eau Claire. He also served on the school board and was chairman of the school board. From 1886 to 1886, Gleason served as postmaster for Eau Claire. Gleason died at Sacred Heart Hospital in Eau Claire, Wisconsin.
