= St. Thomas Episcopal Church (Dover, New Hampshire) =

Historic church in New Hampshire, United States

- U.S. National Register of Historic Places
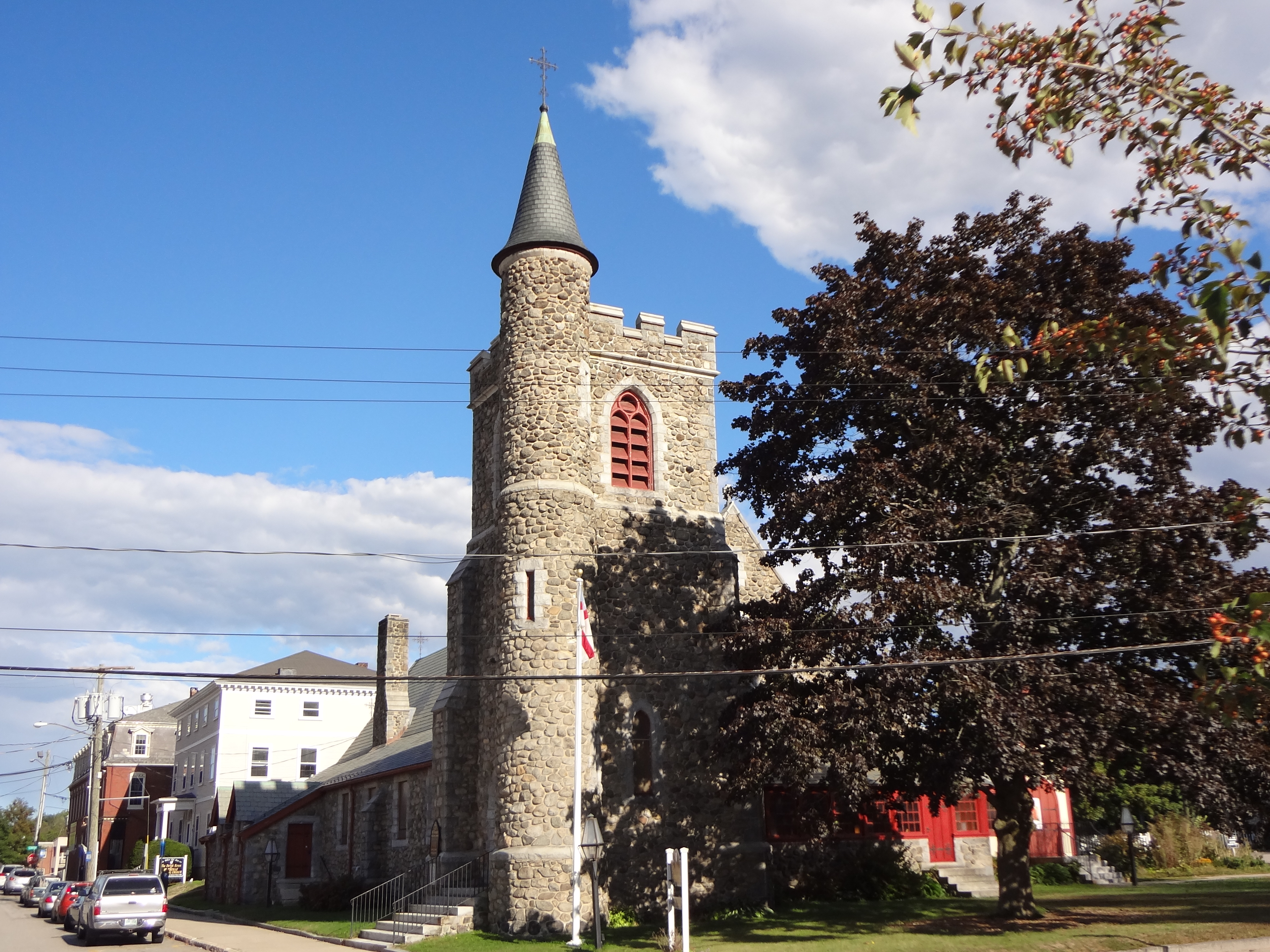

- Location within New Hampshire Location within the United States
- Location: 5 Hale Street; Dover, New Hampshire
- Coordinates: 43°11′36″N 70°52′30″W
- Area: less than one acre
- Built: 1891-1892
- Architect: Henry Vaughan
- Architectural style: Gothic Revival or English Perpendicular
- NRHP reference No.: 84003241
- Added to NRHP: June 7, 1984

St. Thomas Episcopal Church is an historic Episcopal church located at 5 Hale Street in Dover, New Hampshire, in the United States. Founded in 1839, its building, designed by English architect Henry Vaughan, is an important example of his work, and was listed on the National Register of Historic Places in 1984.

The church reported 328 members in 2018 and 279 members in 2023; no membership statistics were reported in 2024 parochial reports. Plate and pledge income reported for the congregation in 2024 was $171,790 with average Sunday attendance (ASA) of 60 persons.

St. Thomas Episcopal Church is a parish in the Seacoast Deanery of the Episcopal Diocese of New Hampshire. The Rev. Suzanne Poulin was called to be the rector on January 25, 2018.

== History ==
St. Thomas Episcopal Church was organized on September 22, 1839. In 1840 the congregation built a Carpenter Gothic church on the corner of Central Avenue and St. Thomas Street next to the William Hale House. In the late 1880s, the city of Dover took the land of both the church and the Hale House by eminent domain to build a new City Hall. This building was demolished in 1891 and the Hale House was moved to the other side of Hale Street.

The church bought a lot next to the relocated Hale House and, in 1890, hired architect Henry Vaughan to design a new church in the Gothic Revival, or English Perpendicular, style. Construction began in 1891 and the first service was held the next year. The church was not consecrated though until September 17, 1916. In 1901, the church bought the William Hale House, which was also later listed on the National Register of Historic Places. On June 7, 1984, it was added to the National Register of Historic Places.

== Architecture ==
St. Thomas is located in downtown Dover, on the south side of Hale Street, across from Dover City Hall. It is basically rectangular in footprint, with a square tower rising at the northwest corner, and slightly projecting transepts. The tower has an outside circular turret which houses its spiral staircase. The tower has angled buttresses at the corners, and the main church body's side windows are also articulated by buttressing. It is covered by a gabled roof supported by heavy wooden trusses in a kingpost form. The interior retains original woodwork and plaster; its gas chandeliers have been replaced by electric lighting. At the back (south side), it is joined by a modern parish hall to the William Hale House, which stands just to its east.

== See also ==
- National Register of Historic Places listings in Strafford County, New Hampshire
- St. Thomas Episcopal Church (disambiguation)
