= Wells Falls =

Waterfall in Ithaca, New York, United States

- Interactive map of Wells Falls
- Coordinates: 42.43367°N 76.48510°W
- Total height: 65 ft (20 m)
- Number of drops: 4

Wells Falls, also known as Businessman's Lunch Falls, is a 65 foot (20 m) waterfall located in Ithaca, New York. It is part of Six Mile Creek, a waterway that flows through Ithaca before merging with the Cayuga Inlet. The falls are notable for their four-tiered cascade, historical significance, and proximity to the Van Natta Pumping Station, an abandoned 19th-century water and power facility.

== Geography and description ==
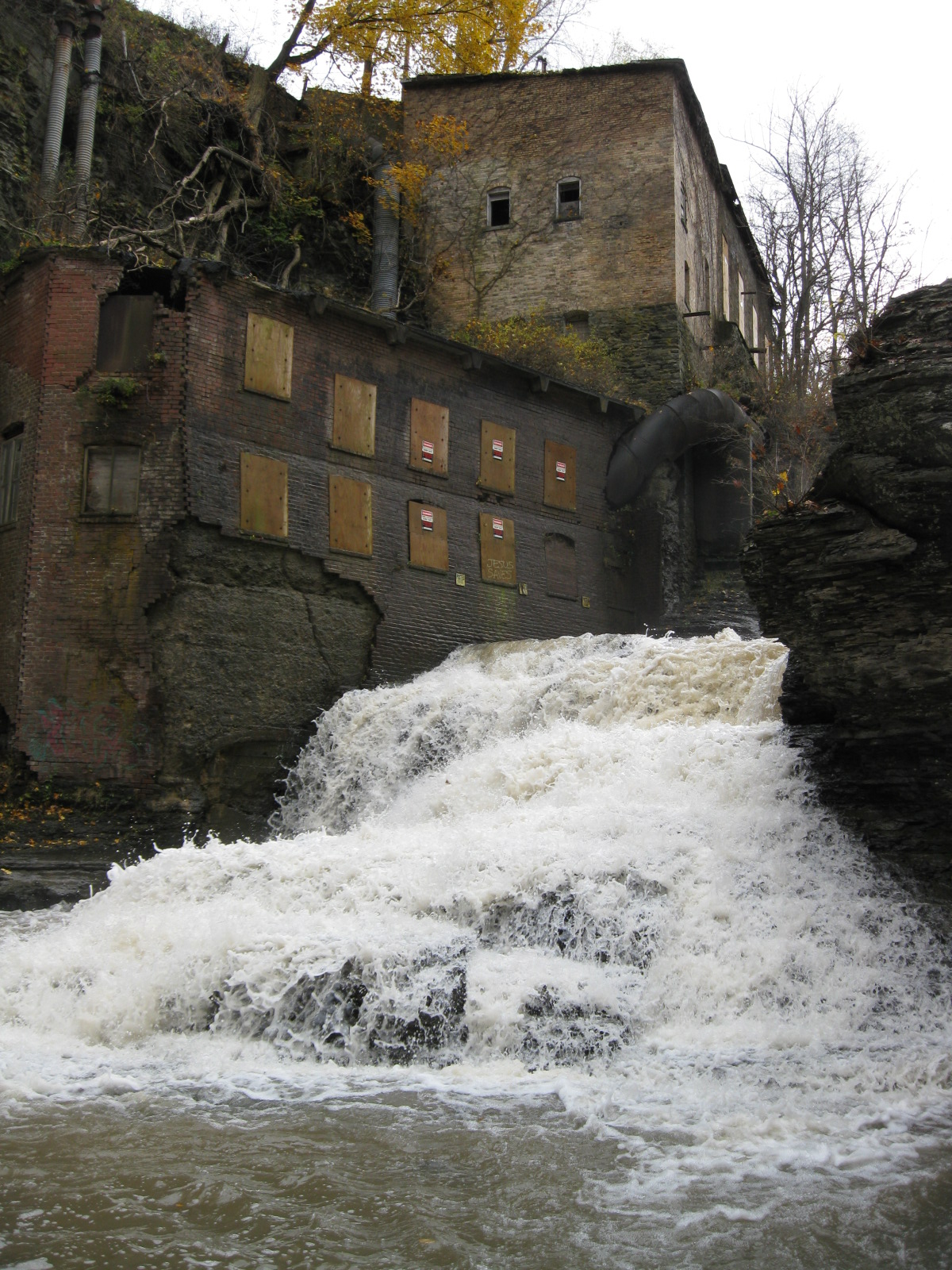
The abandoned Van Natta Pumping Station on Wells Falls

Wells Falls consists of four distinct drops, with the largest being a 30-foot (9.1 m) man-made dam. The remaining natural cascades contribute to its picturesque setting, making it a popular spot for visitors and photographers. The falls are located within the Six Mile Creek Natural Area, a protected region southeast of downtown Ithaca.

== History ==
The Van Natta Pumping Station, adjacent to Wells Falls, was constructed in 1893 on the site of an old flour mill. It played a crucial role in supplying water for drinking and firefighting in Ithaca. However, the typhoid outbreak in 1903 made people begin to be suspicious of the site and its construction. Because of this, a water purification plant was built nearby. The pump station received some improvements in 1906 and a dam improvement in 1925. The station was abandoned in the 1940s, and there was a proposal to convert the place into a hydroelectric plant in the 1980's but it never happened.

The name Businessman's Lunch Falls originated from the tradition of downtown workers visiting the site during lunch breaks, enjoying the peaceful surroundings.

== Accessibility and visitor information ==
Wells Falls is accessible via Giles Street, with parking available at the Mulholland Wildflower Preserve. A quarter-mile trail leads to the base of the falls, offering views of both the cascades and the abandoned pumping station. While the trail is steep in places, it is considered a moderate hike.

== Regulations ==
- Admission: Free
- Swimming: Prohibited
- Pets: Allowed on a leash
- Best Time to Visit: Year-round, with consistent water flow

== See also ==
- Ithaca Falls
- Taughannock Falls
