= St. Thomas Episcopal Church (Slaterville Springs, New York) =

Historic church in New York, United States

- St. Thomas' Episcopal Church
- U.S. National Register of Historic Places
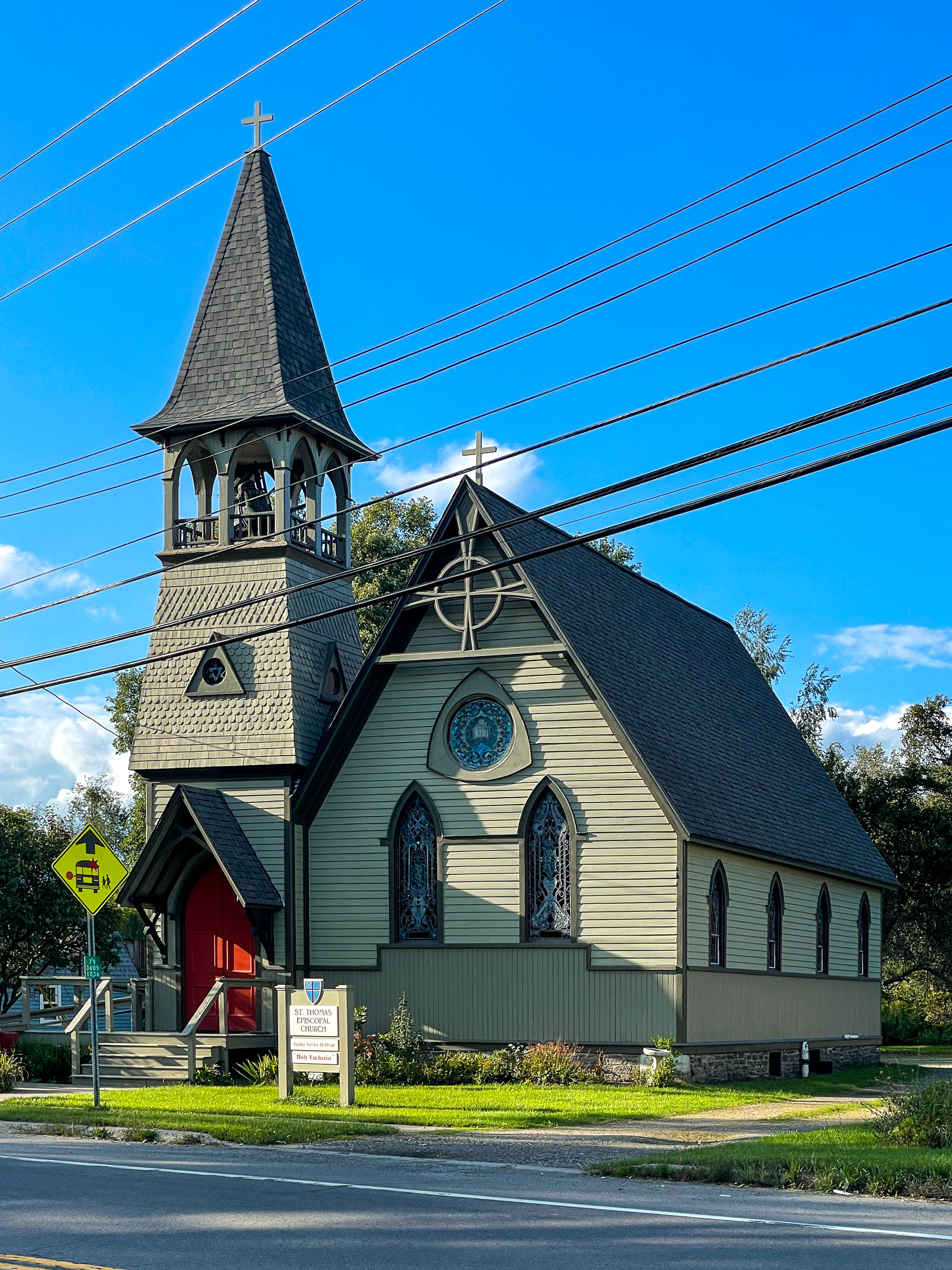

- Location within New York Location within the United States
- Location: 2740 Slaterville Rd. (NY 79), Slaterville Springs, New York
- Coordinates: 42°23′39″N 76°20′44″W
- Area: 0.5 acres (0.20 ha)
- Built: 1893
- Architect: John E. Walsh
- Architectural style: Carpenter Gothic
- NRHP reference No.: 95000458
- Added to NRHP: April 20, 1995

St. Thomas Episcopal Church is a historic Episcopal church building located at 2720 Slaterville Road, east of the post office in Slaterville Springs in the town of Caroline, Tompkins County, New York. It was built in 1893 and is an example of the Carpenter Gothic style of architecture, sometimes called the High Victorian Gothic. Its features include, a steeply sloped roof, lancet windows, lancet covered entry through a side steepled belfry, all of which are typical of the Carpenter Gothic style.

It was listed on the National Register of Historic Places in 1995. Painted white in 1988 when the NRHP images were taken, it has since been painted light brown with a dark brown trim. It is still an active parish in the Episcopal Diocese of Central New York.
