= Caroline, New York =

- Town
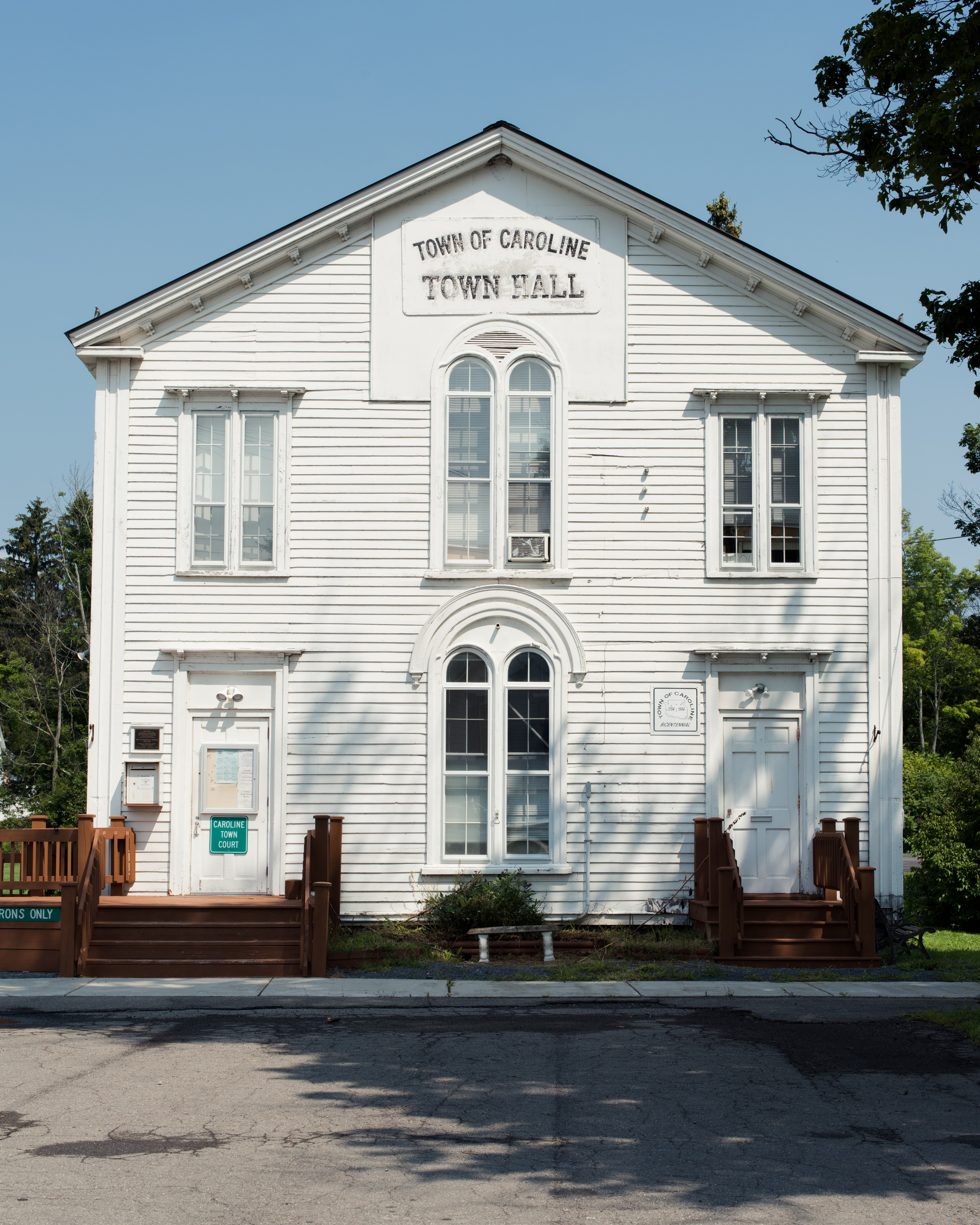

- Location within the state of New York
- Coordinates: 42°21′55″N 76°20′37″W
- Country: United States
- State: New York
- County: Tompkins

Government
  - Supervisor: Mark Witmer (D)
  - Council member: Kate Kelly-Mackenzie (D)
  - Council member: Michelle Brown (D)
  - Council member: Tim Murray (D)
  - Council member: Cal Snow (I)

Area
  - Total: 54.89 sq mi (142.17 km^{2})
  - Land: 54.76 sq mi (141.84 km^{2})
  - Water: 0.13 sq mi (0.34 km^{2})
- Elevation: 1,644 ft (501 m)

Population (2010)
  - Total: 3,282
  - Estimate (2016): 3,481
  - Density: 63.6/sq mi (24.54/km^{2})
- Time zone: UTC-5 (Eastern (EST))
  - Summer (DST): UTC-4 (EDT)
- FIPS code: 36-12606
- GNIS feature ID: 0978795
- Website: Town website

Caroline is a town in Tompkins County, New York, United States. The population was 3,282 at the 2010 census. It is on the county's southeast border, southeast of Ithaca.

== History ==
The area was first settled circa 1794 while the region was still part of Tioga County. Caroline was part of the Watkins and Flint Purchase (1791).

Caroline was formed from the town of Spencer (now in Tioga County) in 1811.

== Notable people ==
- Charles R. Gleason (1830-1907), Wisconsin businessman and politician, was born in Caroline.
- Austin Blair (1818-1894), 13th governor of Michigan.

== Geography ==
According to the United States Census Bureau, the town has a total area of 55.1 square miles (143 km^{2}), of which 55.0 square miles (142 km^{2}) is land and 0.1 square miles (0.26 km^{2}) (0.13%) is water.

The east and south town lines are the border of Tioga County.

New York State Route 79 crosses the town.

== Demographics ==
Historical population
Census	Pop.	Note	%±
1820	1,608		—
1830	2,633		63.7%
1840	2,457		−6.7%
1850	2,537		3.3%
1860	2,345		−7.6%
1870	2,175		−7.2%
1880	2,171		−0.2%
1890	2,092		−3.6%
1900	1,938		−7.4%
1910	1,646		−15.1%
1920	1,542		−6.3%
1930	1,617		4.9%
1940	1,737		7.4%
1950	1,900		9.4%
1960	2,118		11.5%
1970	2,536		19.7%
1980	2,754		8.6%
1990	3,044		10.5%
2000	2,910		−4.4%
2010	3,282		12.8%
2016 (est.)	3,481		6.1%
U.S. Decennial Census

As of the census of 2000, there were 2,910 people, 1,161 households, and 758 families residing in the town. The population density was 52.9 inhabitants per square mile (20.4/km^{2}). There were 1,254 housing units at an average density of 22.8 per square mile (8.8/km^{2}). The racial makeup of the town was 92.85% White, 3.09% African American, 0.58% Native American, 0.86% Asian, 0.10% Pacific Islander, 0.38% from other races, and 2.13% from two or more races. Hispanic or Latino of any race were 2.37% of the population.

There were 1,161 households, out of which 33.2% had children under the age of 18 living with them, 50.9% were married couples living together, 9.3% had a female householder with no husband present, and 34.7% were non-families. 26.8% of all households were made up of individuals, and 7.8% had someone living alone who was 65 years of age or older. The average household size was 2.46 and the average family size was 2.99.

In the town, the population was spread out, with 27.1% under the age of 18, 6.6% from 18 to 24, 28.5% from 25 to 44, 27.9% from 45 to 64, and 9.9% who were 65 years of age or older. The median age was 38 years. For every 100 females, there were 98.5 males. For every 100 females age 18 and over, there were 94.0 males.

The median income for a household in the town was $43,315, and the median income for a family was $51,983. Males had a median income of $35,375 versus $26,587 for females. The per capita income for the town was $21,531. About 6.9% of families and 7.4% of the population were below the poverty line, including 7.6% of those under age 18 and 3.1% of those age 65 or over. The majority of the residents of the Caroline area commute to the Ithaca area.

The Town of Caroline is served by 4 school districts Ithaca (city), New York, Dryden (village), New York, Newark Valley (village), New York and Candor (village), New York. Caroline Elementary School serves the northern and central portions of the town. Brooktondale Baptist School, sponsored by Brooktondale Baptist Church, closed around 2002, although the parish community continues.

== Communities and locations in Caroline ==
- Besemer (formerly "Besemer Depot") – A location on NY-79 in the northwestern corner of the town.
- Brooktondale (formerly "Mott's Corner" and "Brookton") – A hamlet near the western town boundary.
- Caroline – A hamlet on NY-79 at the northern town line.
- Caroline Center (formerly "Centerville") – A hamlet centrally located in the town.
- Caroline Depot – A hamlet in the northwestern part of the town and south of Brooktondale.
- Guide Board Corners – A location south of Slaterville Springs.
- Slaterville Springs (formerly "Slaterville") – A hamlet with a post office on NY-79, site of Caroline Town Hall, formerly the District No. 2 School, and St. Thomas Episcopal Church, which are listed on the National Register of Historic Places.
- Speedsville – A hamlet in the southeastern corner of the town. The District Number 7 School and St. John's Episcopal Church are listed on the National Register of Historic Places.
- West Slaterville (formerly "Boiceville") – A hamlet on NY-79 near the northern town line. It was the site of the first town meeting.
- White Church – A hamlet in the southwestern part of Caroline.

== Education ==
Students in the town of Caroline are dispersed into several school districts: Dryden, Ithaca, Candor, and Newark Valley. A school located within the town is the Caroline Elementary School of the Ithaca City School District.
