= National Register of Historic Places listings in Tompkins County, New York =

Location of Tompkins County in New York

List of the National Register of Historic Places listings in Tompkins County, New York

This is intended to be a complete list of properties and districts listed on the National Register of Historic Places in Tompkins County, New York. The locations of National Register properties and districts (at least for all showing latitude and longitude coordinates below) may be seen in a map by clicking on "Map of all coordinates". One property, Morrill Hall, is further designated a U.S. National Historic Landmark.

This National Park Service list is complete through NPS recent listings posted October 16, 2026.

Contents: Counties in New York
Albany (Albany) – Allegany – Bronx – Broome – Cattaraugus – Cayuga – Chautauqua – Chemung – Chenango – Clinton – Columbia – Cortland – Delaware – Dutchess (Poughkeepsie, Rhinebeck) – Erie (Buffalo) – Essex – Franklin – Fulton – Genesee – Greene – Hamilton – Herkimer – Jefferson – Kings – Lewis – Livingston – Madison – Monroe (Rochester) – Montgomery – Nassau – New York (Below 14th Street, 14th to 59th Streets, 59th to 110th Streets, Above 110th Street, Islands) – Niagara (Niagara Falls) – Oneida – Onondaga (Syracuse) – Ontario – Orange – Orleans – Oswego – Otsego – Putnam – Queens – Rensselaer – Richmond – Rockland – St. Lawrence – Saratoga – Schenectady – Schoharie – Schuyler – Seneca – Steuben – Suffolk – Sullivan – Tioga – Tompkins – Ulster – Warren – Washington – Wayne – Westchester (Northern, Southern, New Rochelle, Peekskill, Yonkers) – Wyoming – Yates

== Current listings ==
	Name on the Register	Image	Date listed	Location	City or town	Description
1	1883 Barn	1883 Barn	November 5, 2025 (#100012400)	2981 Elmira Rd. 42°18′55″N 76°40′00″W	Newfield	
2	William Austin House	William Austin House	July 19, 2002 (#02000798)	34 Seneca St. 42°32′40″N 76°40′01″W	Trumansburg	
3	Bailey Hall	Bailey Hall	September 24, 1984 (#84003113)	Cornell University campus 42°26′58″N 76°28′50″W	Ithaca	
4	Rufus and Flora Bates House	Rufus and Flora Bates House	August 29, 2010 (#10000595)	107 Giles St. 42°26′18″N 76°29′33″W	Ithaca	
5	Biggs Memorial Hospital Cottage	Biggs Memorial Hospital Cottage	November 23, 2020 (#100001248)	402 Harris B. Dates Dr. 42°28′17″N 76°32′23″W	Ithaca	
6	Boardman House	Boardman House	May 6, 1971 (#71000559)	120 E. Buffalo St. 42°25′01″N 76°27′31″W	Ithaca	
7	CG 40300 (motor lifeboat)		September 27, 2021 (#100007018)	USCGAUX Flotilla 2-2, 508 Taughannock Blvd. 42°26′43″N 76°30′47″W	Ithaca	
8	Caldwell Hall	Caldwell Hall	September 24, 1984 (#84003117)	Cornell University campus 42°26′58″N 76°28′43″W	Ithaca	
9	Hermon Camp House	Hermon Camp House	December 4, 1973 (#73001279)	Camp St. 42°32′19″N 76°39′42″W	Trumansburg	
10	Cascadilla School Boathouse	Cascadilla School Boathouse	October 4, 1991 (#91001498)	S. shore of Cayuga Lake at the mouth of Fall Cr., Stewart Park; 42°27′37″N 76°30′33″W	Ithaca	
11	Cayuga Preventorium	Cayuga Preventorium	January 15, 2021 (#100006012)	1420 Taughannock Blvd. 42°31′08″N 76°33′24″W	Ulysses	Now home to the Cayuga Nature Center.
12	Luther Clarke House	Luther Clarke House	June 8, 1984 (#84003119)	39 W. Main St. 42°29′25″N 76°18′03″W	Dryden	
13	Clinton Hall	Clinton Hall	July 7, 1988 (#88001019)	108-114 N. Cayuga St. 42°26′23″N 76°30′00″W	Ithaca	
14	Clinton House	Clinton House	August 12, 1971 (#71000560)	116 N. Cayuga St. 42°26′25″N 76°29′58″W	Ithaca	
15	Comstock Hall	Comstock Hall	September 24, 1984 (#84003122)	235 Garden Avenue, Cornell University campus 42°26′58″N 76°28′44″W	Ithaca	Now known as the Computing and Communications Center.
16	Cornell Heights Historic District	Cornell Heights Historic District	September 14, 1989 (#89001205)	Roughly bounded by Kline Rd., Highland Ave., Brock Ln., Triphammer Rd., Fall Creek, Stewart Ave., and Needham Pl. 42°27′18″N 76°29′13″W	Cayuga Heights and Ithaca	
17	De Witt Park Historic District	De Witt Park Historic District	October 26, 1971 (#71000561)	A square bounded roughly by properties fronting on E. Buffalo, E. Court, N. Cayuga, and N. Tioga Sts. 42°26′30″N 76°29′53″W	Ithaca	
18	Deke House	Deke House	January 11, 1991 (#90002144)	13 South Ave. 42°26′40″N 76°29′16″W	Ithaca	
19	Dennis–Newton House	Dennis–Newton House	September 6, 2016 (#16000590)	421 N. Albany St. 42°26′36″N 76°30′06″W	Ithaca	First black fraternity house in the U.S.; Alpha Phi Alpha used this 1870 house when established at Cornell in 1905
20	District No. 2 School, Caroline and Dryden	District No. 2 School, Caroline and Dryden	January 5, 2005 (#04001453)	2670 Slaterville Rd. 42°23′40″N 76°21′00″W	Slaterville Springs	
21	District Number 7 School	District Number 7 School	November 30, 2004 (#04000701)	Mill Rd. at the Park; 42°18′15″N 76°15′12″W	Speedsville	
22	Dryden District School No. 5	Dryden District School No. 5	November 4, 1994 (#94001282)	1756 Hanshaw Rd. 42°28′26″N 76°25′53″W	Dryden	
23	Dryden Historic District	Dryden Historic District	June 15, 1984 (#84003921)	Roughly bounded by E. Main, James, Lake and South Sts. 42°29′21″N 76°17′46″W	Dryden	
24	East Hill Historic District	East Hill Historic District	August 14, 1986 (#86001652)	Roughly bounded by Cascadilla Creek, Eddy St., Six Mile Creek, and Aurora St. 42°22′27″N 76°29′11″W	Ithaca	
25	East Roberts Hall	East Roberts Hall	September 24, 1984 (#84003178)	Cornell University campus 42°26′55″N 76°28′42″W	Ithaca	Building demolished ca 1988
26	Ellis Methodist Episcopal Church	Ellis Methodist Episcopal Church	May 27, 1993 (#93000443)	Ellis Hollow Rd. 42°25′00″N 76°23′00″W	Ellis Hollow	
27	Enfield Falls Mill and Miller's House	Enfield Falls Mill and Miller's House	February 25, 1979 (#79001637)	SW of Ithaca in Robert H. Treman State Park; 42°24′05″N 76°35′26″W	Ithaca	
28	Fernow Hall	Fernow Hall	September 24, 1984 (#84003183)	Cornell University campus 42°26′55″N 76°28′33″W	Ithaca	
29	First Presbyterian Church of Ulysses	First Presbyterian Church of Ulysses	June 3, 1999 (#99000669)	Main St. 42°32′29″N 76°39′34″W	Trumansburg	
30	Forest Home Historic District	Forest Home Historic District	August 6, 1998 (#98000999)	Roughly along NY392; 42°27′06″N 76°28′11″W	Forest Home	
31	Groton High School	Groton High School	July 24, 1992 (#92000953)	177 Main St. 42°35′17″N 76°22′00″W	Groton	
32	Nicoll Halsey House and Halseyville Archeological Sites	Nicoll Halsey House and Halseyville Archeological Sites	June 24, 1993 (#93000504)	Address Restricted; 42°31′50″N 76°38′15″W	Halseyville	
33	Hayt's Chapel and Schoolhouse	Hayt's Chapel and Schoolhouse	December 22, 2005 (#05001453)	1296-1298 Trumansburg Rd. 42°28′08″N 76°32′43″W	Ithaca	
34	Indian Fort Road Site		September 30, 1983 (#83001810)	Address Restricted	Trumansburg	
35	Ithaca Downtown Historic District	Ithaca Downtown Historic District	February 9, 2005 (#05000018)	E. and W. State, N & S Cayuga, N. Aurora, N. Tioga Sts. 42°26′23″N 76°29′53″W	Ithaca	
36	Ithaca Gas and Electric Corporation Building		May 24, 1990 (#90000734)	123 S. Cayuga St. 42°26′20″N 76°29′56″W	Ithaca	
37	Ithaca Pottery Site	Ithaca Pottery Site	July 17, 1979 (#79001635)	Address Restricted	Ithaca	
38	Jamieson and McKinney Block		May 24, 1990 (#90000733)	115-121 S. Cayuga St. 42°26′20″N 76°29′56″W	Ithaca	
39	Jennings-Marvin House	Jennings-Marvin House	June 8, 1984 (#84003184)	9 Library St. 42°29′30″N 76°17′59″W	Dryden	
40	Lacy-Van Vleet House	Lacy-Van Vleet House	June 8, 1984 (#84003187)	45 W. Main St. 42°29′25″N 76°18′07″W	Dryden	
41	Lavender Hill Commune	Lavender Hill Commune	February 3, 2025 (#100011422)	327 Tupper Road; 42°18′41″N 76°32′28″W	Newfield	
42	Lehigh Valley Railroad Station	Lehigh Valley Railroad Station	December 31, 1974 (#74001311)	W. Buffalo St. and Taughannock Blvd. 42°26′28″N 76°30′41″W	Ithaca	
43	Llenroc	Llenroc	April 16, 1980 (#80002781)	100 Cornell Ave. 42°26′48″N 76°29′32″W	Ithaca	Home of Ezra Cornell
44	Methodist Episcopal Church	Methodist Episcopal Church	June 8, 1984 (#84003189)	2 North St. 42°29′26″N 76°17′51″W	Dryden	
45	Methodist Episcopal Church of Jacksonville	Methodist Episcopal Church of Jacksonville	November 9, 2018 (#100003120)	5020 Jacksonville Road; 42°30′33″N 76°36′53″W	Jacksonville	1827 former Greek Revival church building, heavily renovated in 1855, was home to first Methodist congregation established in county
46	Morrill Hall, Cornell University	Morrill Hall, Cornell University	October 15, 1966 (#66000576)	Cornell University campus 42°26′55″N 76°29′08″W	Ithaca	
47	Newfield Covered Bridge	Newfield Covered Bridge	February 25, 2000 (#00000095)	Covered Bridge St. 42°21′47″N 76°35′27″W	Newfield	
48	Rice Hall	Rice Hall	September 24, 1984 (#84003190)	Cornell University campus 42°26′53″N 76°28′28″W	Ithaca	
49	Roberts Hall	Roberts Hall	September 24, 1984 (#84003191)	Cornell University campus 42°26′55″N 76°28′44″W	Ithaca	Demolished ca 1990
50	Rockwell House	Rockwell House	June 8, 1984 (#84003192)	52 W. Main St. 42°29′26″N 76°18′10″W	Dryden	
51	Rogues' Harbor Inn	Rogues' Harbor Inn	August 26, 2009 (#09000657)	2079 E. Shore Dr. 42°32′16″N 76°30′20″W	Lansing	
52	St. James AME Zion Church	St. James AME Zion Church	July 22, 1982 (#82003407)	116-118 Cleveland Ave. 42°26′16″N 76°30′18″W	Ithaca	
53	St. John's Episcopal	St. John's Episcopal	November 22, 2000 (#00001407)	1504 Seventy Six Rd. 42°18′10″N 76°15′16″W	Speedsville	
54	St. Thomas Episcopal Church	St. Thomas Episcopal Church	April 20, 1995 (#95000458)	2740 Slaterville Rd. (NY 79); 42°23′39″N 76°20′44″W	Slaterville Springs	
55	Second Baptist Society of Ulysses	Second Baptist Society of Ulysses	December 28, 2001 (#01001381)	1 Congress St. 42°32′35″N 76°39′45″W	Trumansburg	
56	Second Tompkins County Courthouse	Second Tompkins County Courthouse	March 18, 1971 (#71000562)	121 E. Court St. 42°26′31″N 76°32′48″W	Ithaca	
57	Southworth House	Southworth House	June 8, 1984 (#84003193)	14 North St. 42°29′32″N 76°17′52″W	Dryden	
58	Southworth Library	Southworth Library	June 8, 1984 (#84003195)	24 W. Main St. 42°29′26″N 76°17′58″W	Dryden	
59	State Theater	State Theater	June 14, 1996 (#96000613)	107-119 W. State St. 42°26′21″N 76°29′59″W	Ithaca	
60	Stewart Park	Stewart Park	May 5, 2023 (#100008895)	1 James L. Gibbs Dr. 42°27′40″N 76°30′13″W	Ithaca	
61	Stone Hall	Stone Hall	September 24, 1984 (#84003860)	Cornell University campus 42°26′55″N 76°28′46″W	Ithaca	Demolished ca 1988
62	Telluride House	Telluride House	February 22, 2011 (#11000042)	217 West Ave. 42°26′46″N 76°29′13″W	Ithaca	
63	Tibbetts–Rumsey House	Tibbetts–Rumsey House	May 25, 2018 (#100002515)	310 W. State St. 42°26′23″N 76°30′08″W	Ithaca	1880 house built for locally prominent family, built by early Cornell architecture school graduate, later renovated and expanded by another locally prominent family, combines Eastern Stick and Queen Anne styles
64	US Post Office-Ithaca	US Post Office-Ithaca	May 11, 1989 (#88002514)	213 N. Tioga St. 42°26′28″N 76°29′48″W	Ithaca	
65	West Dryden Methodist Episcopal Church	West Dryden Methodist Episcopal Church	August 9, 1991 (#91001029)	Jct. of W. Dryden and Sheldon Rds. 42°31′02″N 76°24′54″W	Dryden	
66	Andrew Dickson White House	Andrew Dickson White House	December 4, 1973 (#73001278)	27 East Ave. 42°26′54″N 76°28′57″W	Ithaca	
67	Wing Hall	Wing Hall	September 24, 1984 (#84003204)	Cornell University campus 42°26′49″N 76°28′19″W	Ithaca	

== Former listing ==
	Name on the Register	Image	Date listed	Date removed	Location	City or town	Description
1	Strand Theatre		February 22, 1979 (#79001636)	1999	310 E. State St.	Ithaca	Demolished in 1993.

== See also ==
- National Register of Historic Places listings in New York
