= Southworth House =

Southworth House may refer to:

- Southworth House (Greenwood, Mississippi), listed on the National Register of Historic Places in Leflore County, Mississippi
- Southworth House (Dryden, New York), listed on the NRHP in Tompkins County, New York
- Southworth House (Cleveland, Ohio), listed on the NRHP in Cuyahoga County, Ohio
