= Frank R. McGeoy =

American architect

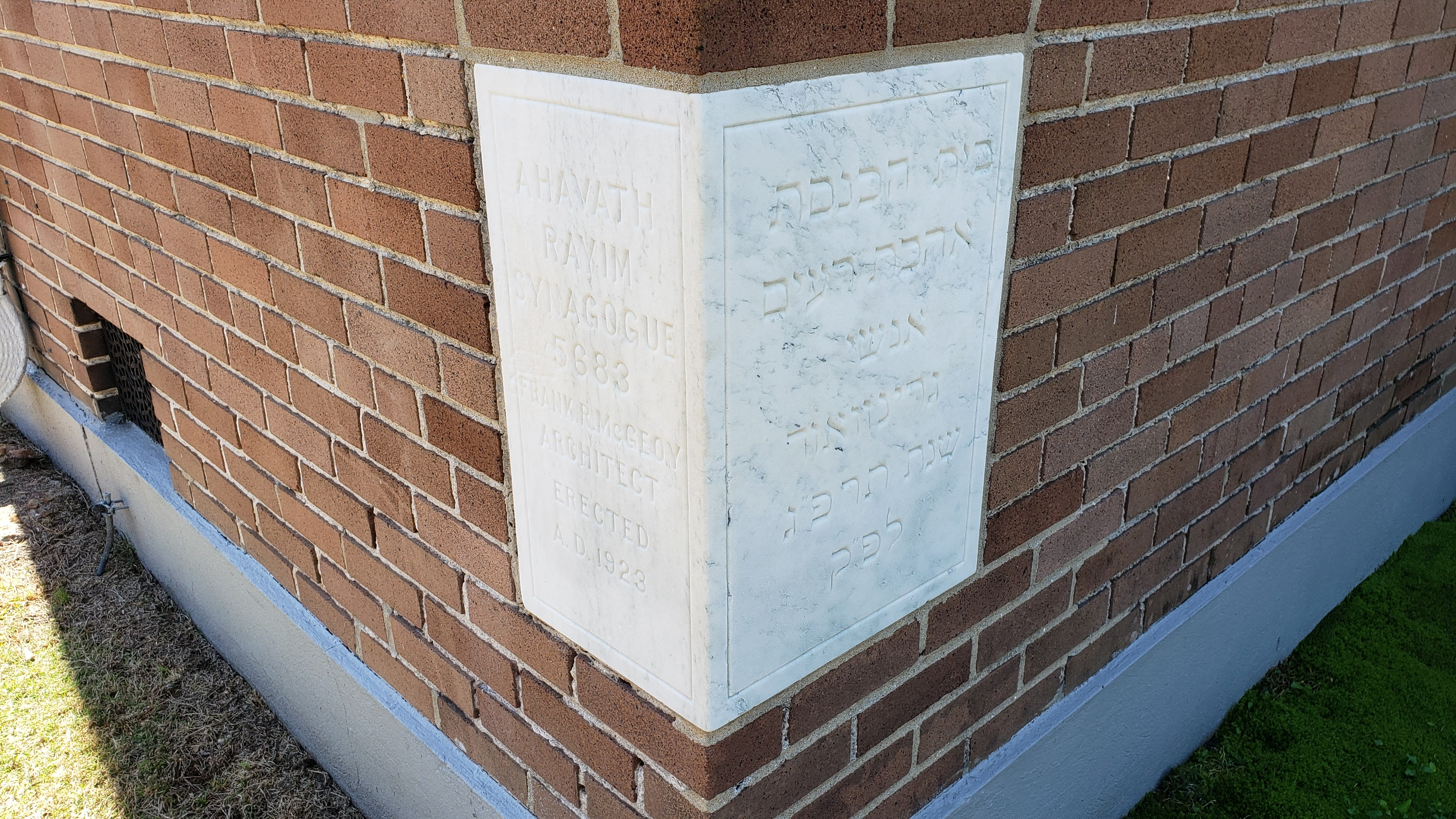
Cornerstone of Ahavath Rayim Synagogue in Greenwood, MS

Frank R. McGeoy (1868 - April 13, 1940) was an architect of Greenwood, Mississippi.

== Early life ==
McGeoy was born in Memphis, Tennessee in 1868.

== Career ==
McGeoy became an architect in Greenwood, Mississippi in 1908. He was a director of the Greenwood Chamber of Commerce.

A number of his works are listed on the National Register of Historic Places.

Works include:

- Murphey-Jennings House, 307 Walnut St. Sumner, MS (McGeoy, Frank R.), NRHP-listed
- Southworth House, 1108 Mississippi Ave. Greenwood, MS (McGeoy, Frank R.), NRHP-listed
- Wesley Memorial Methodist Episcopal, 800 Howard St. Greenwood, MS (McGeoy, Frank R.), NRHP-listed
- Wesley Methodist Church Historic District, roughly bounded by Cotton, Howard, Palace, Weeks Lane, and W. Johnson Greenwood, MS (McGeoy, Frank R.), NRHP-listed
- Congregation Ahavath Rayim temple within Williams Landing and Eastern Downtown Residential Historic District, Roughly bounded by Front, McLemore and Lamar, Market, and George Sts. Greenwood, MS (McGeoy, Frank R.), NRHP-listed
- Beaman House, Greenwood
- 810 Grand Boulevard, in the Grand Boulevard Historic District, Greenwood
- Sunday School building of the First Methodist Church of Greenwood, 310 W. Washington St. Greenwood, MS (McGeoy, Frank R.), NRHP-listed

== Personal life and death ==
McGeoy was married, and he had three sons. He resided at 905 Mississippi Avenue in Greenwood, Mississippi.

McGeoy died on April 13, 1940, in Greenwood.
