= Clinton Hall =

Clinton Hall may refer to:

- The third, fourth, or fifth home of the New York Mercantile Library, United States. (The fourth home was the former Astor Opera House from 1853 to 1890.)
- Clinton Hall (Ithaca, New York), a historic commercial building in Ithaca, New York, United States.
- Clinton J. Hall (1926-1984), American lawyer and politician
- Clinton Hall (New York City), a building at 137 Nassau St., New York City, now demolished.
- Clinton Hall (restaurant), New York City-based restaurant chain
