= Cotton Row Historic District =

Cotton Row Historic District may refer to:

- Cotton Row Historic District (Greenwood, Mississippi), listed on the National Register of Historic Places in Leflore County, Mississippi
- Cotton Row Historic District (Memphis, Tennessee), listed on the National Register of Historic Places in Shelby County, Tennessee
