= East Hill Historic District =

There are two listings on the National Register of Historic Places in New York by this name:

- East Hill Historic District (Ithaca, New York), in Tompkins County
- East Hill Historic District (Springville, New York), in Erie County
