= Douglass Boardman =

American jurist and lawyer (1822–1891)

Douglass Boardman (October 31, 1822 – September 5, 1891) was an American jurist and lawyer who served on the Supreme Court of New York and as Dean of Cornell Law School.

== Biography ==
Boardman, the youngest in a family of twelve children, was born in Covert, Seneca County, New York, on October 31, 1822. The first three years of his college course were spent at Hobart College, and he graduated from Yale College in 1842.

On graduation he began the study of law in Ithaca, New York, and after a brief residence in Trumansburg, in the same county, he returned to Ithaca in July, 1846, and made that place his home for the rest of his life. He was admitted to the bar in October, 1845, and his first public office was the District Attorneyship of Tompkins County, which he held for two or three years from January, 1848; and for four years from January, 1852, he was County Judge and Surrogate. For ten years from January, 1856, he practiced law in partnership with the Hon. Francis M. Finch. In the fall of 1865 he was elected a justice of the Supreme Court of New York for a term of eight years; at the expiration of which time he was re-elected without opposition for a new term of fourteen years.

He was a director of the First National Bank of Ithaca from the date of its organization, in 1864, and became its president in 1884. He was made a trustee of Cornell University by vote of the alumni in 1875, and was re-elected by the trustees in 1885. On the organization of Cornell Law School in 1889 he was appointed its dean, and became active and efficient in promoting its success. He held many other trusts in Ithaca, and in the latter years of his life had peculiarly trying responsibilities as the executor of the large estates of Mr. McGraw and his daughter, Mrs. Fiske. He died, after a very brief illness, from pneumonia, at Sheldrake, Seneca County, New York, on September 5, 1891, in his 69th year.

He was married, on May 27, 1846, to Amanda M. Vincent, of Ithaca, who survived him, with their only child, a daughter.

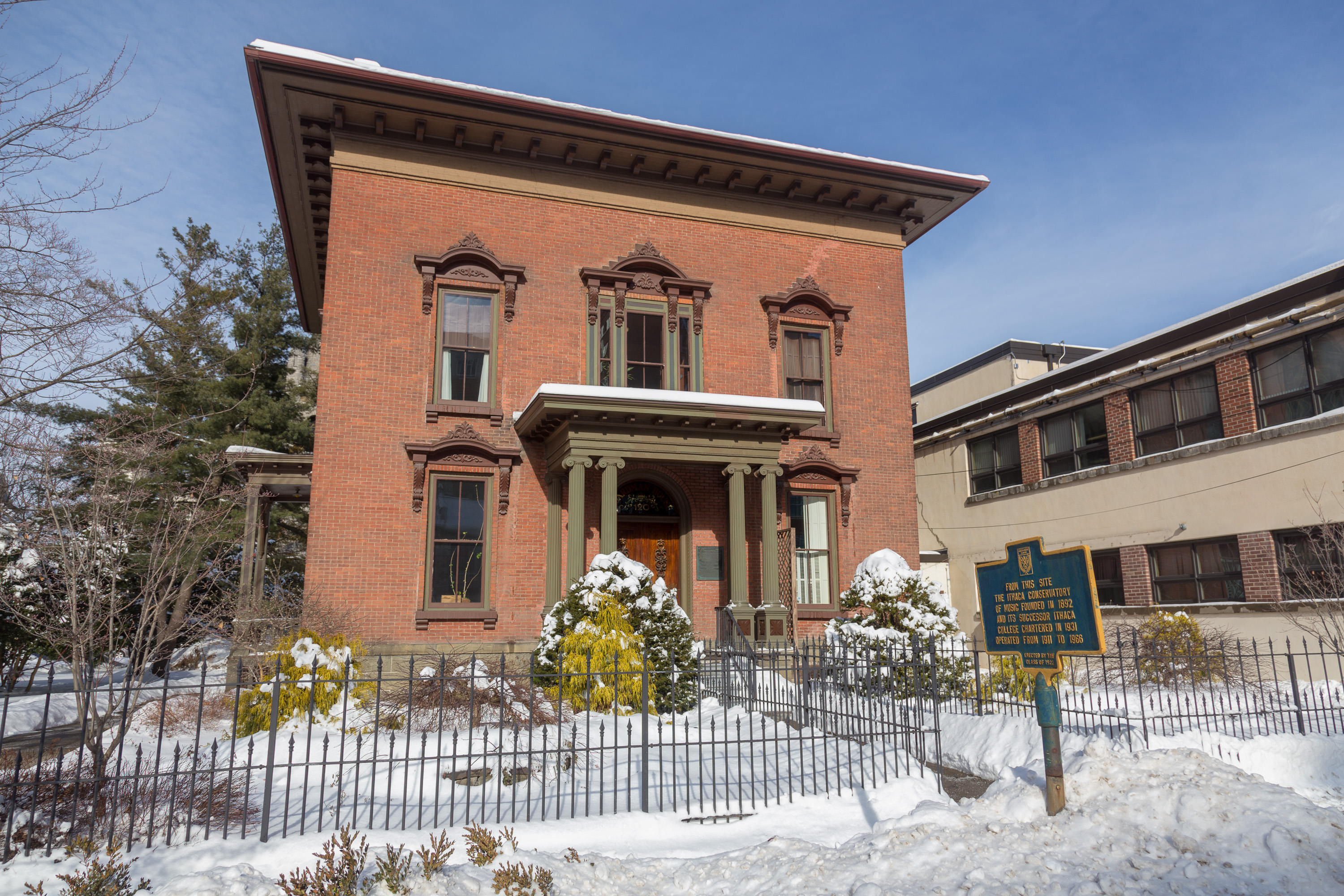
Boardman House

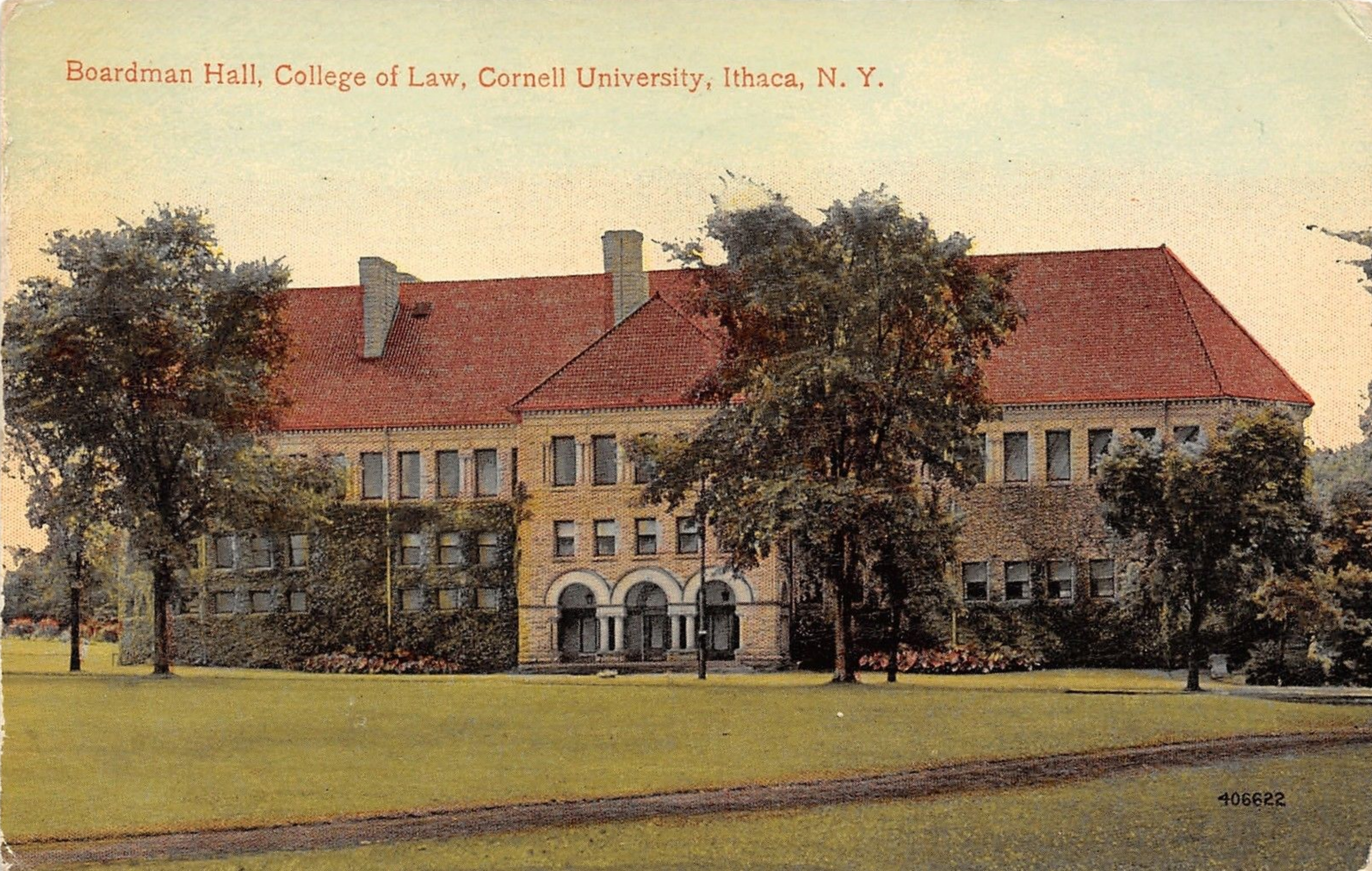
Boardman Hall (demolished)

== Boardman House ==
Boardman lived in an Italianate townhouse at 120 East Buffalo Street, next to DeWitt Park, from 1886 to 1911. In 1911 the house was sold to the Ithaca Conservatory of Music, which later became Ithaca College.

== Boardman Hall ==
In 1893, the newly constructed law building at Cornell University, designed by William Henry Miller, was named Boardman Hall in his honor. Boardman's widow and daughter gifted the university 12,415 volumes for the new law library, said to be "one of the most complete in the world" at the time. Boardman Hall was demolished in 1959 and Olin Library was built in its place. A set of sculpted stone heads were salvaged from Boardman and incorporated into Olin Library.

== See also ==
- Boardman House
