= Four Corners Historic District =

Four Corners Historic District may refer to:

- Four Corners Historic District (Greenwood, Mississippi), listed on the National Register of Historic Places in Leflore County, Mississippi
- Four Corners (Newark), listed on the National Register of Historic Places in Essex County, New Jersey
