= Dryden Historic District =

Dryden Historic District can refer to:

- Dryden Historic District (Dryden, New York), listed on the U.S. NRHP
- Dryden Historic District (North Park, San Diego, California), proposed
