= Ithaca Downtown Historic District =

Ithaca Downtown Historic District may refer to:

- Ithaca Downtown Historic District (Ithaca, Michigan), listed on the NRHP in Michigan
- Ithaca Downtown Historic District (Ithaca, New York), listed on the NRHP in New York
