= National Register of Historic Places listings in Leflore County, Mississippi =

Location of Leflore County in Mississippi

This is a list of the National Register of Historic Places listings in Leflore County, Mississippi.

This is intended to be a complete list of the properties and districts on the National Register of Historic Places in Leflore County, Mississippi, United States. Latitude and longitude coordinates are provided for many National Register properties and districts; these locations may be seen together in a map.

There are 39 properties and districts listed on the National Register in the county.

This National Park Service list is complete through NPS recent listings posted October 30, 2026.

== Current listings ==
	Name on the Register	Image	Date listed	Location	City or town	Description
1	Black Site	Black Site	November 21, 1978 (#78001612)	Address restricted	Greenwood	
2	Black Site		January 11, 1991 (#90002107)	Address restricted	Sidon	
3	Boulevard Subdivision Historic District		March 2, 1986 (#86000521)	Roughly bounded by Jeff Davis Ave., Poplar St., President Ave., and Grand Boulevard; 33°31′50″N 90°11′16″W	Greenwood	
4	Building at 308 Lamar Street	Building at 308 Lamar Street	November 4, 1985 (#85003456)	308 Lamar St. 33°31′11″N 90°10′40″W	Greenwood	
5	Building at 312 George Street		November 4, 1985 (#85003454)	312 George St. 33°31′09″N 90°10′43″W	Greenwood	
6	Building at 710 South Boulevard		November 4, 1985 (#85003455)	710 South Boulevard; 33°30′48″N 90°11′12″W	Greenwood	
7	Central Commercial and Railroad Historic District		November 4, 1985 (#85003463)	Roughly bounded by Washington, Main, and Lamar Sts., Ave. F, Wardaman and Johnson Sts., and Cotton and Fulton Sts. 33°31′02″N 90°10′43″W	Greenwood	
8	Cotton Row Historic District	Cotton Row Historic District	May 15, 1980 (#80002279)	Cotton, Front, Fulton, Howard, Main, and Market Sts. 33°31′14″N 90°10′59″W	Greenwood	
9	Downtown Greenwood Historic District		January 7, 2020 (#100004502)	Roughly bounded by Front St., River Rd., Lamar, St., McLemore St., Pelican St., Avenue F, Henry St., West Johnson St., Vardaman St., & Dewey St. 33°31′06″N 90°11′00″W	Greenwood	
10	Falls Site (22LF507)		May 1, 1986 (#86000922)	Northeastern quarter of the northwestern quarter of Section 17, Township 22 North, Range 1 West; 33°46′54″N 90°19′20″W	Minter City	
11	First Methodist Church of Greenwood	First Methodist Church of Greenwood	November 4, 1985 (#85003457)	310 W. Washington St. 33°31′09″N 90°11′04″W	Greenwood	
12	Fort Leflore		April 4, 1979 (#79001327)	North of Greenwood off Mississippi Highway 7; 33°33′06″N 90°10′26″W	Greenwood vicinity	
13	Fort Pemberton Site		June 19, 1973 (#73001020)	U.S. Route 49, E. 33°31′45″N 90°14′07″W	Greenwood	
14	Four Corners Historic District	Four Corners Historic District	February 14, 1985 (#85000282)	Washington and Henderson Sts. 33°31′07″N 90°11′09″W	Greenwood	
15	Greenwood High School		November 4, 1985 (#85003458)	400 Cotton St. 33°31′11″N 90°10′40″W	Greenwood	
16	Greyhound Lines Station		July 8, 2010 (#10000439)	325 Main St. 33°31′10″N 90°10′52″W	Greenwood	
17	Gritney Neighborhood Historic District		November 14, 2022 (#100008266)	Roughly bounded by Carrollton Ave., Miller Ave., Bowie Ln., East Martin Luther King Jr. Blvd., 100 East Martin Luther King Jr. Blvd., properties fronting the south side of South and McGehee Sts., Y and MVRR Corridor; 33°30′49″N 90°09′54″W	Greenwood	
17	Itta Bena Historic District		September 30, 2009 (#09000785)	Roughly bounded by Cemetery St. to the north, Lake Shore Dr. to the east, Lake Side St. to the south, and Dewey St. to the west 33°29′42″N 90°19′11″W	Itta Bena	
18	Keesler Bridge	Keesler Bridge	November 16, 1988 (#88002489)	Spans the Yazoo River at Fulton St. 33°31′18″N 90°11′03″W	Greenwood	
19	Lane's Chapel Site	Lane's Chapel Site	May 4, 1976 (#76001099)	Address restricted	Money	
20	Marclare		November 25, 1980 (#80002280)	River Rd. 33°31′19″N 90°13′17″W	Greenwood vicinity	
21	McLean Site (22LF513)		April 6, 1988 (#88000230)	Southwestern quarter of the northwestern quarter of Section 33, Township 19 North, Range 1 West; 33°28′18″N 90°18′46″W	Itta Bena vicinity	
22	Murphey Site	Murphey Site	November 10, 1993 (#93001151)	Address restricted	Itta Bena	
23	Neill Archeological Site		April 26, 1976 (#76001100)	Address restricted	Whaley	
24	Provine House	Provine House	April 8, 1980 (#80002281)	319 Grand Boulevard; 33°31′39″N 90°11′13″W	Greenwood	
25	Rebecca Site	Rebecca Site	January 11, 1991 (#90002105)	Address restricted	Sidon	
26	River Road and Western Downtown Residential Historic District		March 2, 1986 (#86000519)	Roughly bounded by River Rd., Dewey and Gillespie, Washington and Johnson, and 1st Sts. 33°31′04″N 90°11′20″W	Greenwood	
27	Rosemary-Humphreys House	Rosemary-Humphreys House	November 4, 1985 (#85003459)	1440 Grand Boulevard; 33°32′20″N 90°11′33″W	Greenwood	
28	Southworth House	Southworth House	November 4, 1985 (#85003460)	1108 Mississippi Ave. 33°30′34″N 90°11′13″W	Greenwood	
29	STAR OF THE WEST	STAR OF THE WEST	May 21, 1975 (#75001050)	On the Tallahatchie River; 33°31′54″N 90°13′59″W	Greenwood	
30	Stratton Archeological Site	Stratton Archeological Site	July 28, 1999 (#99000840)	Address restricted	Sidon	
31	Sweethome Mound	Sweethome Mound	June 9, 1978 (#78001613)	Address restricted	Wakeland	
32	Wesley Memorial Methodist Episcopal	Wesley Memorial Methodist Episcopal	November 4, 1985 (#85003461)	800 Howard St. 33°30′49″N 90°10′52″W	Greenwood	
33	Wesley Methodist Church Historic District		April 8, 1999 (#99000381)	Roughly bounded by Cotton, Howard, Palace, Weeks Lane, and W. Johnson; 33°30′41″N 90°10′54″W	Greenwood	
34	Whaley Archeological Site		March 15, 1976 (#76001101)	Northwestern quarter of the northwestern quarter of Section 5, Township 20 North, Range 2 East; 33°36′20″N 90°07′04″W	Whaley	
35	W.M. Whittington House		July 19, 1984 (#84002255)	401 E. Market St. 33°31′18″N 90°10′40″W	Greenwood	
36	Wildwood Plantation Commissary and Shop		September 18, 2013 (#13000734)	Cty. Rd. 626; 33°37′10″N 90°14′24″W	Money	
37	Williams Landing and Eastern Downtown Residential Historic District		March 2, 1986 (#86000520)	Roughly bounded by Front, McLemore and Lamar, Market, and George Sts. 33°31′15″N 90°10′38″W	Greenwood	
38	Wright House		November 4, 1985 (#85003462)	414 Fulton Ave. 33°31′02″N 90°10′59″W	Greenwood	

== See also ==
- List of National Historic Landmarks in Mississippi
- National Register of Historic Places listings in Mississippi
