= Murphey-Jennings House =

Historic house in Mississippi, United States

- U.S. National Register of Historic Places
- Location within Mississippi
- Location: 307 Walnut Street, Sumner, Mississippi
- Coordinates: 33°58′01″N 90°22′10″W
- Area: 1.1 acres (0.45 ha)
- Built: 1904
- Architect: Frank R. McGeoy
- Architectural style: Colonial Revival, Queen Anne
- NRHP reference No.: 82004632
- Added to NRHP: March 25, 1982

The Murphey-Jennings House is a historic house in Sumner, Mississippi. It was built in 1904 Smith Murphey II, a planter who owned 26,000 acres of arable land. Murphey was also the owner of a store in Sumner. After he died in 1904, his widow married Hugh Jackson Jennings, a planter and philanthropist who supported the Baptist Memorial Hospital-Memphis. Her second husband died in 1921, and she died in 1962.

The house was designed by Frank R. McGeoy in the Queen Anne and Colonial Revival architectural styles. It has been listed on the National Register of Historic Places since March 25, 1982.
