= Hayt's Chapel and Schoolhouse =

- U.S. National Register of Historic Places
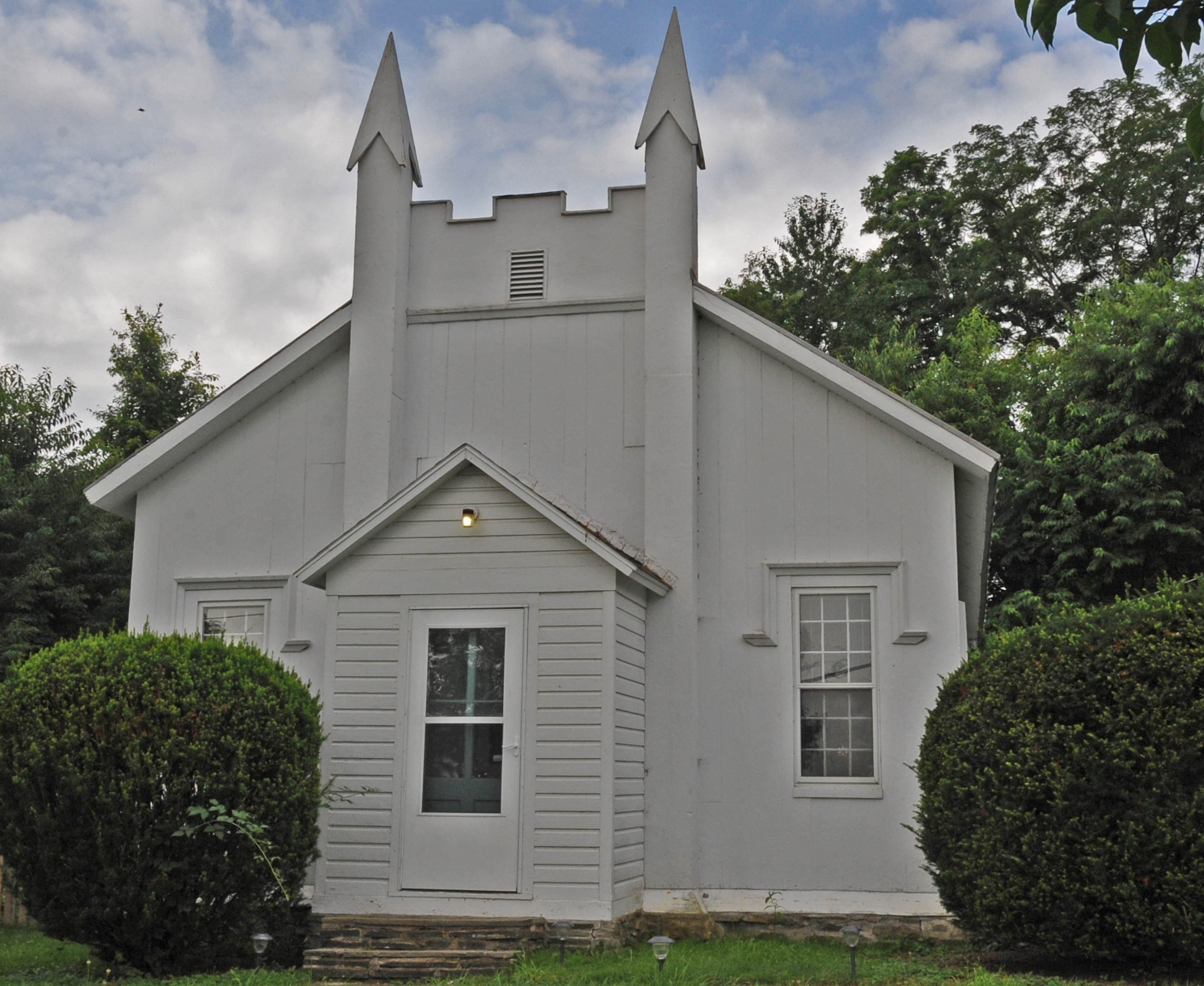

- Location within New York Location within the United States
- Location: 1296-1298 Trumansburg Rd., Ithaca, New York
- Coordinates: 42°28′8″N 76°32′43″W
- Area: 0.6 acres (0.24 ha)
- Built: 1850
- Architect: Hayt, Charles
- Architectural style: Greek Revival, Gothic Revival
- MPS: Freedom Trail, Abolitionism, and African American Life in Central New York MPS
- NRHP reference No.: 05001453
- Added to NRHP: December 22, 2005

Hayt's Chapel and Schoolhouse consists of a historic church and a historic school building located at Ithaca in Tompkins County, New York. The chapel is a small rectangular frame gable roofed structure constructed in 1847 and measuring approximately 20 feet by 40 feet. The structure features a number of Gothic Revival details. There is a small entrance vestibule added sometime in the 1930s or 1940s when the building was converted for school use.

In 1996, the Town of Ithaca honored the location with a historic marker. The buildings were listed on the National Register of Historic Places in 2005.

== Chapel ==
Passage of the Fugitive Slave Act of 1850 split members of Ithaca's Presbyterian congregation (located next to DeWitt Park). The church's Rev. Dr. William Wisner was strongly pro-slavery, and a number of anti-slavery church members split with the congregation to establish their own church. This group, headed by prominent abolitionist Charles Hayt, along with Murdock Halsey and others, set up a small gothic church on land donated by Hayt.

Hayt's Chapel was referred to as the "Abolition Church" and was thought to have been a stop on the Underground Railroad, which roughly followed the western shore of Cayuga Lake along route 96. Abolitionist meetings were held in the schoolhouse and chapel.

== Schoolhouse ==
Hayt's Schoolhouse was built prior to the church, in the 1830s and is a one-story frame T-shaped building in the Greek Revival style. The one-room school remained in use until 1964 and has since been converted to an apartment. The schoolhouse retains features such as its blackboard and flagpole.
