= Clinton Hall (restaurant) =

Restaurant chain in New York City, United States

Restaurant information
- Established: 2013
- Owner: Lure Group
- Food type: American, Gastro-pub
- Location: New York City, New York, United States
- Other locations: Manhattan (FiDi, Chelsea, 36th St, 51st St); Brooklyn (Williamsburg)
- Website: www.clintonhallny.com

Clinton Hall is a restaurant chain in New York City, New York, United States.

== Description ==
Clinton Hall operates multiple restaurants in Manhattan, New York City. There is also a restaurant in the Pod Hotel in Williamsburg, Brooklyn. In Manhattan, the Washington Street location has a beer garden and picnic tables.

Clinton Hall serves burgers, beers, and ciders.

== History ==
In April 2025, Clinton Hall added the "teeny-weeny mini meal", which includes a small burger with a 2-ounce patty, 1.5 ounces of French fries, and a 5-ounce drink. The New York Times described the meal as "a kid’s meal for the 21-and-older set".

== See also ==
- List of restaurant chains in the United States
- List of restaurants in New York City
