= Methodist Episcopal Church (Dryden, New York) =

Historic church in New York, United States

- U.S. National Register of Historic Places
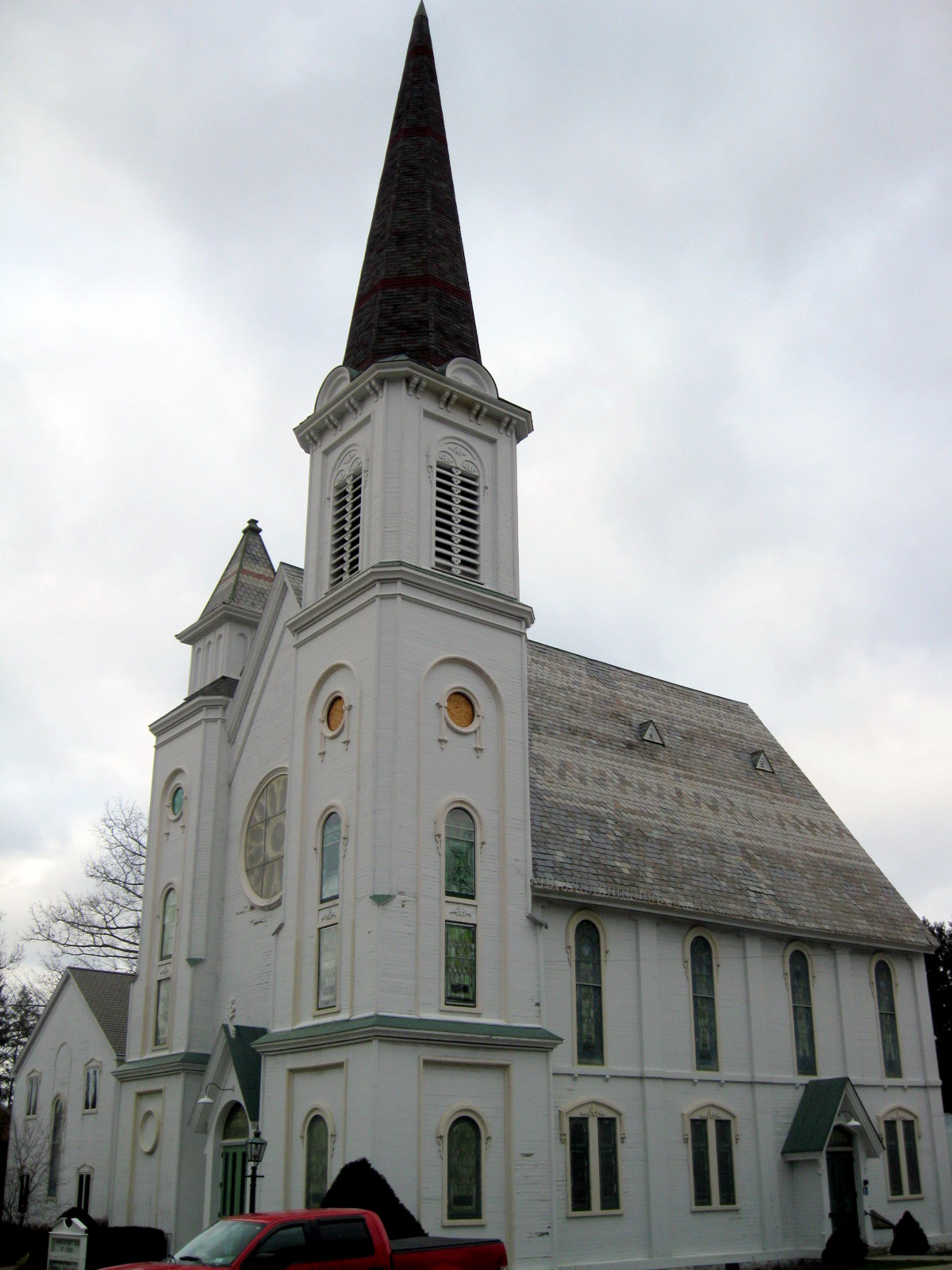
- Methodist Episcopal Church, January 2010

- Location within New York Location within the United States
- Location: 2 North St., Dryden, New York
- Coordinates: 42°29′26″N 76°17′51″W
- Area: less than one acre
- Built: 1874
- Architect: Moore, Henry H.
- Architectural style: Romanesque
- MPS: Dryden Village MRA
- NRHP reference No.: 84003189
- Added to NRHP: June 8, 1984

Methodist Episcopal Church is a historic Methodist Episcopal church located at Dryden in Tompkins County, New York. It is a 2 1/2-story frame church structure built in 1874 in the Romanesque Revival style. It is located at the northeast corner of the "four corners" main intersection and, with its towering spire, serves as a focal point and community landmark.

It was listed on the National Register of Historic Places in 1984.
