= Lacy-Van Vleet House =

Historic house in New York, United States

- U.S. National Register of Historic Places
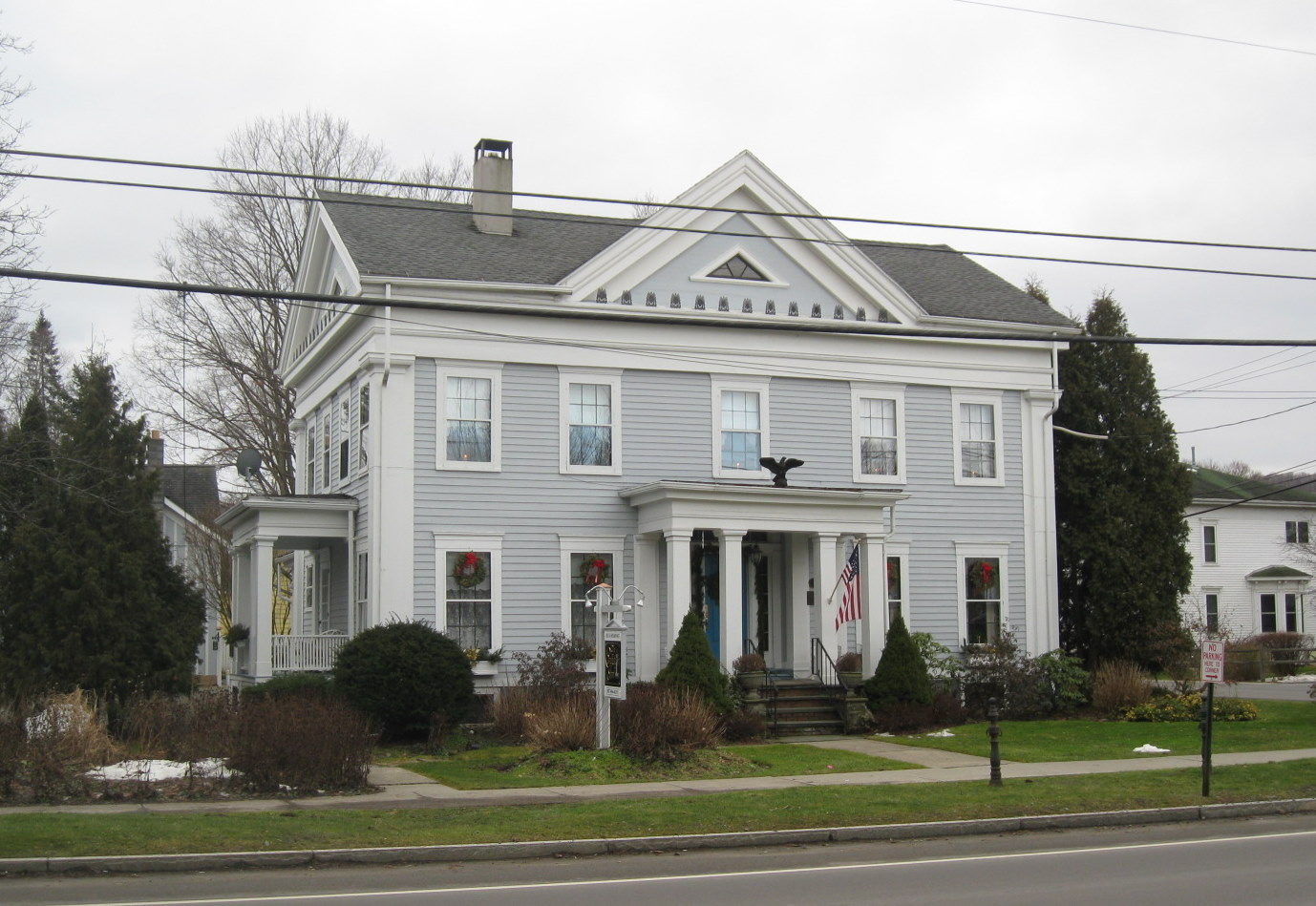
- Lacy-Van Vleet House, January 2010

- Location within New York Location within the United States
- Location: 45 W. Main St., Dryden, New York
- Coordinates: 42°29′25″N 76°18′7″W
- Area: 0.3 acres (0.12 ha)
- Built: 1845
- Architectural style: Greek Revival, Federal
- MPS: Dryden Village MRA
- NRHP reference No.: 84003187
- Added to NRHP: June 08, 1984

Lacy-Van Vleet House is a historic home located at Dryden in Tompkins County, New York. It was built about 1845 and is a 2 1/2-story, five-by-four-bay, frame residence representative of the transition from the Federal to Greek Revival style. It features Doric order porticoed porches on the front and side.

It was listed on the National Register of Historic Places in 1984.
