= Cotton Row Historic District (Memphis, Tennessee) =

- U.S. National Register of Historic Places
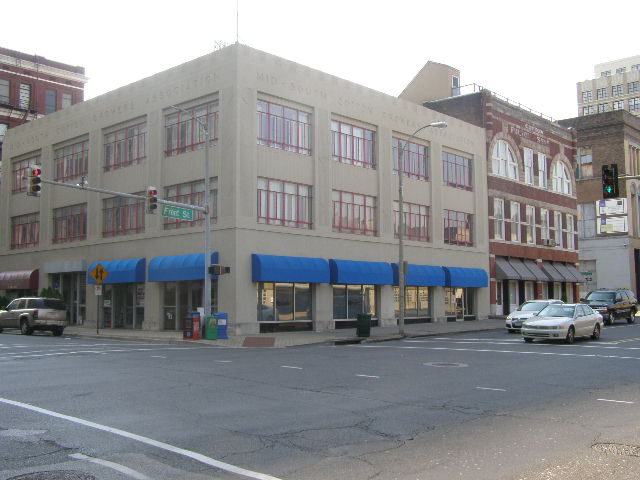
- Mid-South Cotton Growers Association, 44 South Front Street on the southeast corner with Monroe Street, Memphis, Tenn.
- Location: S. Front St. between Monroe and Gayoso Aves., Memphis, Tennessee
- Area: 20 acres (8.1 ha)
- Architectural style: Art Deco, Romanesque
- NRHP reference No.: 79002467
- Added to NRHP: August 1, 1979

Cotton Row Historic District defines the center of the Mid-South Cotton Agri-business. From 1826, the first cotton arrived. These 300 bales were brought by wagon. Even today, cotton is important to Memphis. By the start of the American Civil War, Memphis with its river port, bankers, manufacturers, and brokers became the business focus for the Mid-South. By 1900, the city was the world's leading inland cotton market and the largest producer of cottonseed oil. During the 1880s and 1890s, between 400,000 and 700,000 cotton bales arrived yearly in Memphis. The cotton industry had a great influence on the city and the region. A variety of jobs were created, such as: spinners', buyers, buyers for expert, cotton classers, weighers, compress hands and clerks.

The buildings of Front Row, aka Front Street were built in the late nineteenth and early twentieth centuries. They are utilitarian and unpretentious. Functionalism dominated the design of these building in a period when architectural expression was varied. The exceptions are the Joseph N. Oliver Building (99,101,103 South Front Street) and the Hart Building (48 South Front Street).

Optional reference text:
