= Luther Clarke House =

Historic house in New York, United States

- U.S. National Register of Historic Places
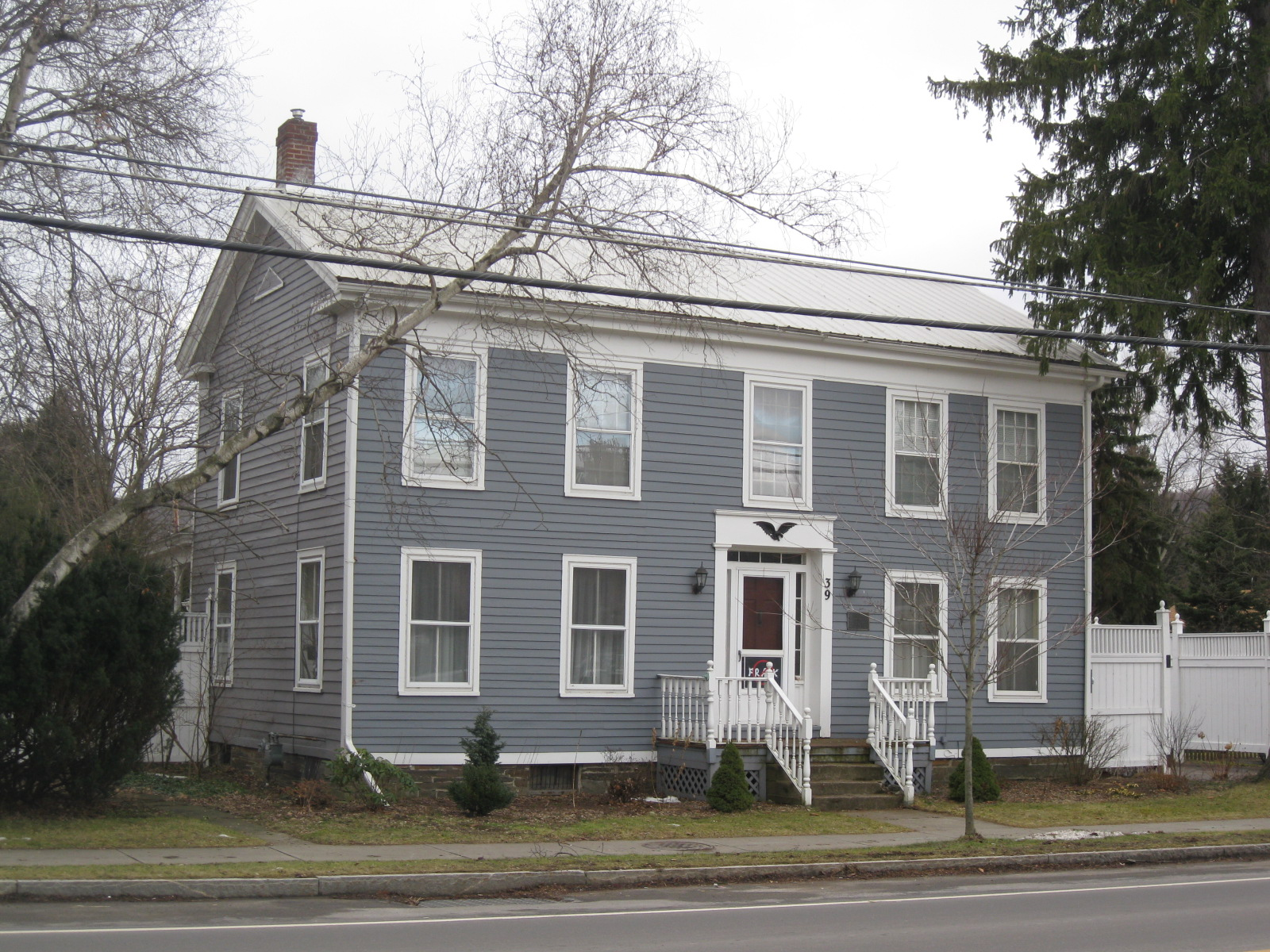
- Luther Clarke House, January 2010

- Location within New York Location within the United States
- Location: 39 W. Main St., Dryden, New York
- Coordinates: 42°29′25″N 76°18′3″W
- Area: less than one acre
- Built: 1820
- Architectural style: Federal
- MPS: Dryden Village MRA
- NRHP reference No.: 84003119
- Added to NRHP: June 08, 1984

Luther Clarke House is a historic home located at Dryden in Tompkins County, New York. It is a 2-story, five-by-two-bay, frame Federal-style structure built about 1820.

It was listed on the National Register of Historic Places in 1984.
