= Ithaca Downtown Historic District (Ithaca, New York) =

Historic district in New York, United States

- U.S. National Register of Historic Places
- U.S. Historic district
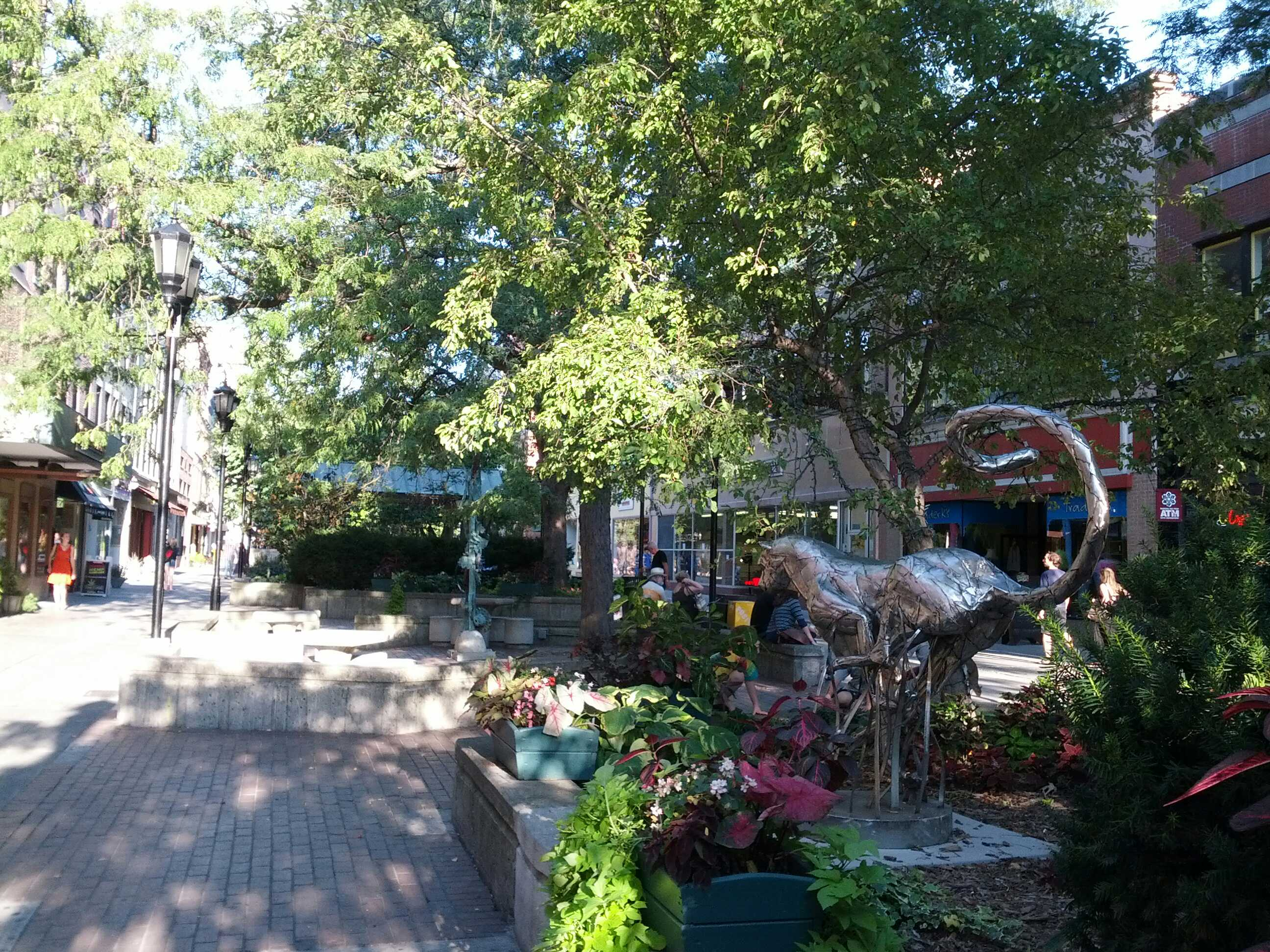

- Location within New York Location within the United States
- Location: E. and W. State, N & S Cayuga, N. Aurora, N. Tioga Sts., Ithaca, New York
- Coordinates: 42°26′23″N 76°29′53″W
- Area: 10 acres (4.0 ha)
- Architectural style: Greek Revival, Italianate
- NRHP reference No.: 05000018
- Added to NRHP: February 9, 2005

Ithaca Downtown Historic District is a national historic district located at Ithaca in Tompkins County, New York. The district consists of 64 contributing mostly commercial buildings. It is composed mainly of multi-story buildings with brick exteriors and flat or low-pitched roofs fronted by a variety of parapets set off by decorative cornices. The district includes three separately listed properties: Clinton House, Clinton Hall, and the State Theater.

It was listed on the National Register of Historic Places in 2005.
