= Jennings-Marvin House =

Historic house in New York, United States

- U.S. National Register of Historic Places
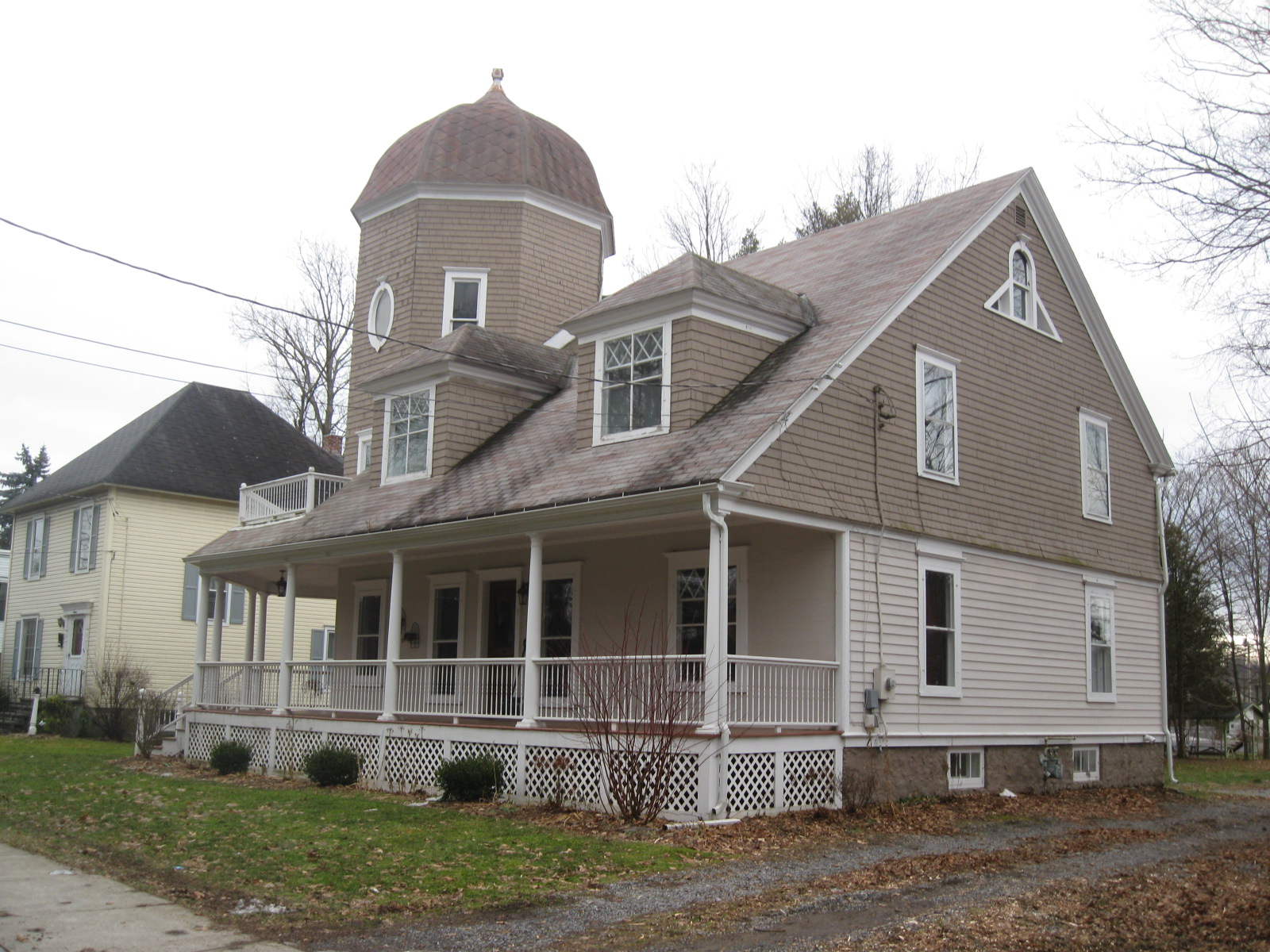
- Jennings-Marvin House, January 2010

- Location within New York Location within the United States
- Location: 9 Library St., Dryden, New York
- Coordinates: 42°29′30″N 76°17′59″W
- Area: less than one acre
- Built: 1897
- Architect: Dwight, J.
- Architectural style: Colonial Revival, Queen Anne
- MPS: Dryden Village MRA
- NRHP reference No.: 84003184
- Added to NRHP: June 08, 1984

Jennings-Marvin House is a historic home located at Dryden in Tompkins County, New York. It was built in 1897 and is a 2-story, three-bay, frame Queen Anne–style structure with Colonial Revival and Shingle style detailing. The most notable feature is the 2 1/2-story octagonal tower with its wooden shingle sheathing and oval windows.

It was listed on the National Register of Historic Places in 1984.
