= East Hill Historic District (Ithaca, New York) =

Historic district in New York, United States

- U.S. National Register of Historic Places
- U.S. Historic district
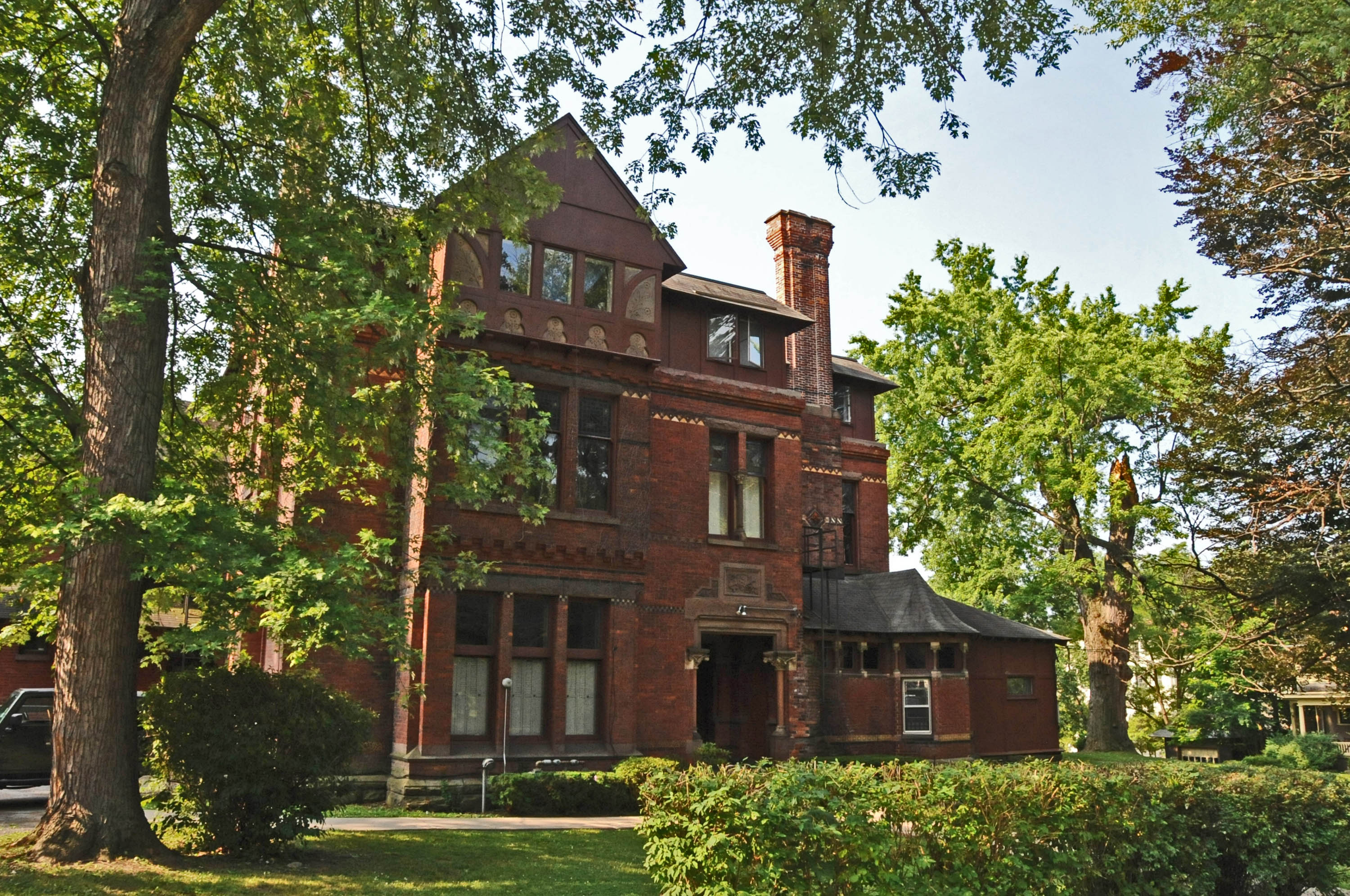

- Location within New York Location within the United States
- Location: Roughly bounded by Cascadilla Creek, Eddy St., Six Mile Creek, and Aurora St., Ithaca, New York
- Coordinates: 42°22′27″N 76°29′11″W
- Area: 65 acres (26 ha)
- Architect: Miller, William H.; Et al.
- Architectural style: Mid 19th Century Revival, Colonial Revival, Late Victorian
- NRHP reference No.: 86001652
- Added to NRHP: August 14, 1986

East Hill Historic District is a national historic district located at Ithaca in Tompkins County, New York. The district consists of 263 contributing buildings and one contributing structure. It contains the greatest concentration of Ithaca's architecturally and historically significant buildings and has retained the architectural integrity of the 1870-1920 period.

It was listed on the National Register of Historic Places in 1986.

== See also ==
- National Register of Historic Places listings in Tompkins County, New York
