= Boardman House (Ithaca, New York) =

Historic house in New York, United States

- U.S. National Register of Historic Places
- U.S. National Historic Landmark District – Contributing property
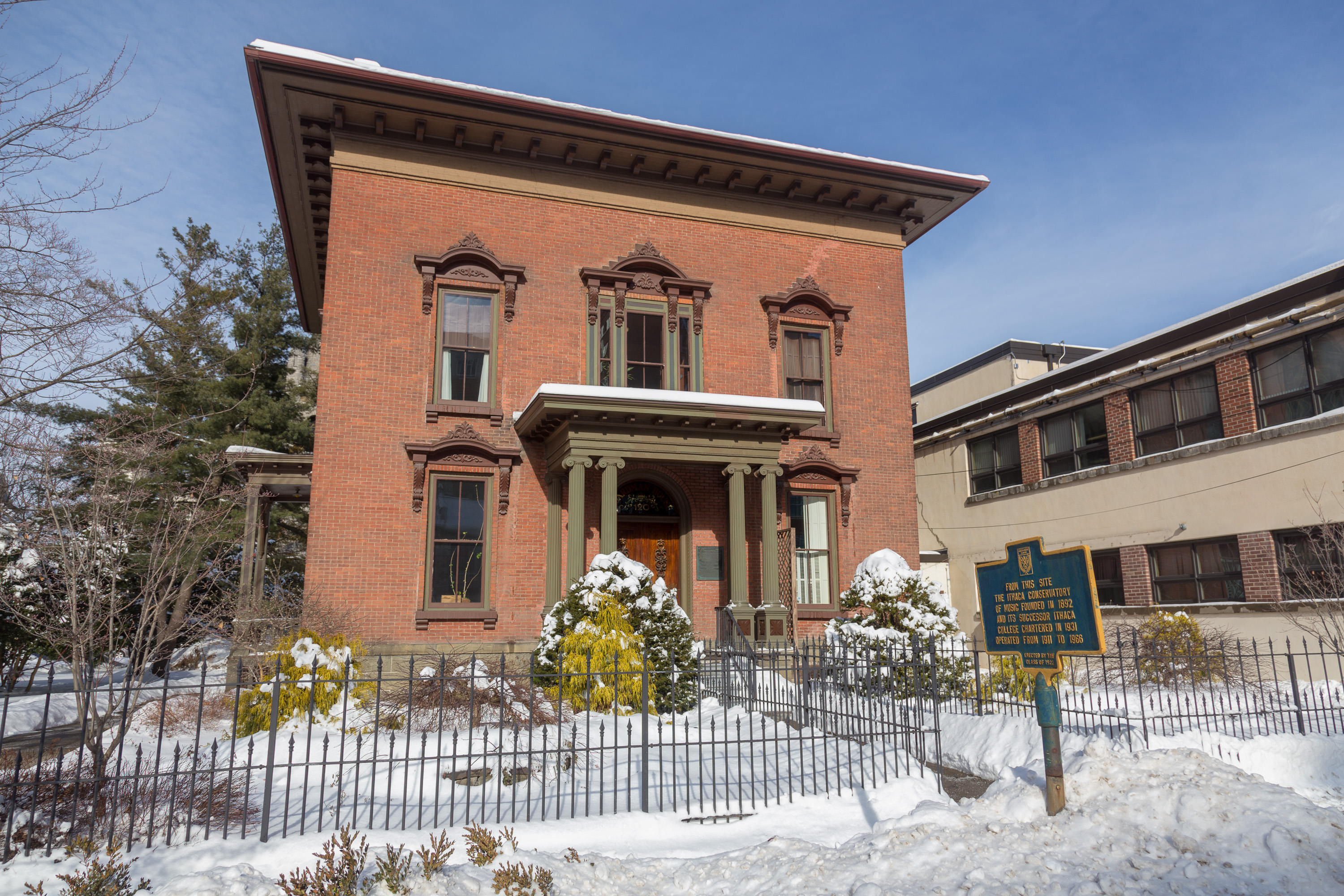

- Location within New York Location within the United States
- Interactive map showing the location of Boardman House
- Location: 120 E. Buffalo St., Ithaca, New York
- Coordinates: 42.44148°N 76.49794°W
- Area: 0.2 acres (0.081 ha)
- Built: 1867
- Architectural style: Italianate
- Part of: De Witt Park Historic District (ID71000561)
- NRHP reference No.: 71000559
- Added to NRHP: May 6, 1971

The Boardman House is a historic house located at 120 East Buffalo Street in Ithaca, Tompkins County, New York. It is part of the De Witt Park Historic District.

== Description and history ==
The house was built in 1866 by A.B. Dale for George McChain, on land purchased from Ezra Cornell. It is a three-story, Italianate structure with red brick and brown trim, with full basement. The main block is 42 feet square and features a hipped roof and cupola.

The house is named for Judge Douglass Boardman, the first dean of Cornell Law School, who purchased it in 1886. In 1911, the building was sold to the Ithaca Conservatory of Music, now Ithaca College.

In 1966, the Ithaca College Museum of Art opened in the Boardman House, but the museum closed in 1972. The college sold the building in 1972.

The building was listed on the National Register of Historic Places on May 6, 1971 and currently used for offices.

== See also ==
- De Witt Park Historic District
- Douglas Boardman
