= Second Tompkins County Courthouse =

Building in Ithaca, New York

- U.S. National Register of Historic Places
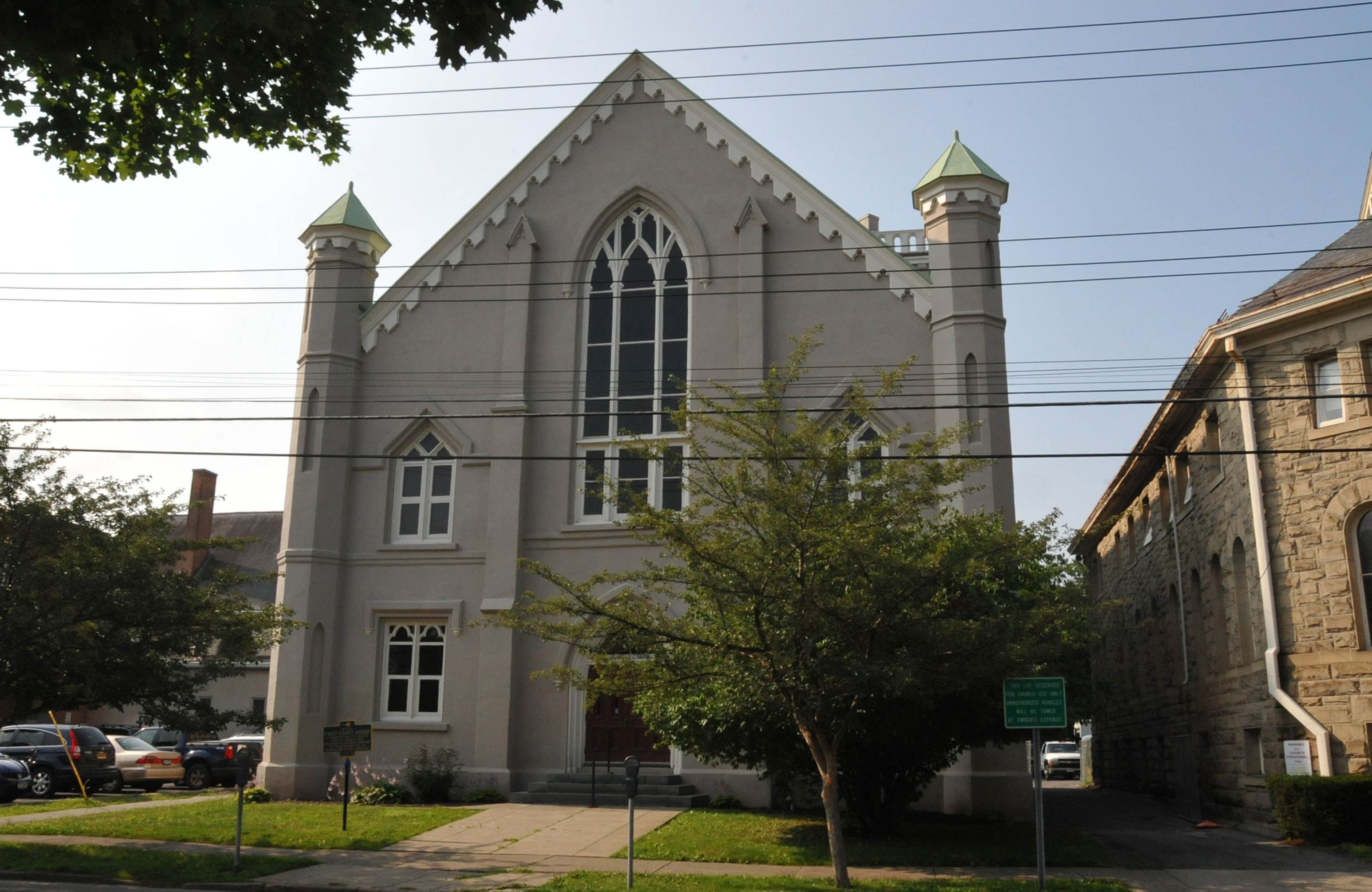

- Location within New York Location within the United States
- Interactive map showing the location of Second Tompkins County Courthouse
- Location: 121 E. Court St., Ithaca, New York
- Coordinates: 42°26′32.5″N 76°29′53.5″W
- Area: 0.2 acres (0.081 ha)
- Built: 1854
- Architect: Maurice, John F.
- Architectural style: Gothic Revival
- NRHP reference No.: 71000562
- Added to NRHP: March 18, 1971

Second Tompkins County Courthouse, also known as Old Courthouse, is a historic courthouse located at 121 E. Court Street in Ithaca in Tompkins County, New York. It is the oldest building still standing in the county. It is a two-story, 57 feet by 75 feet rectangular building with a three-story tower. The building is built of red brick, covered with stucco, over a stone foundation. The tower contains a belfry with a pointed arch opening on each of the four sides. It was built in 1854 and has a notable open timber roof.

It was listed on the National Register of Historic Places in 1971. The Tompkins County Legislature meets in the building and calls it the Governor Daniel D. Tompkins Building.

== See also ==
- De Witt Park Historic District
