= Rockwell House (Dryden, New York) =

Historic house in New York, United States

- U.S. National Register of Historic Places
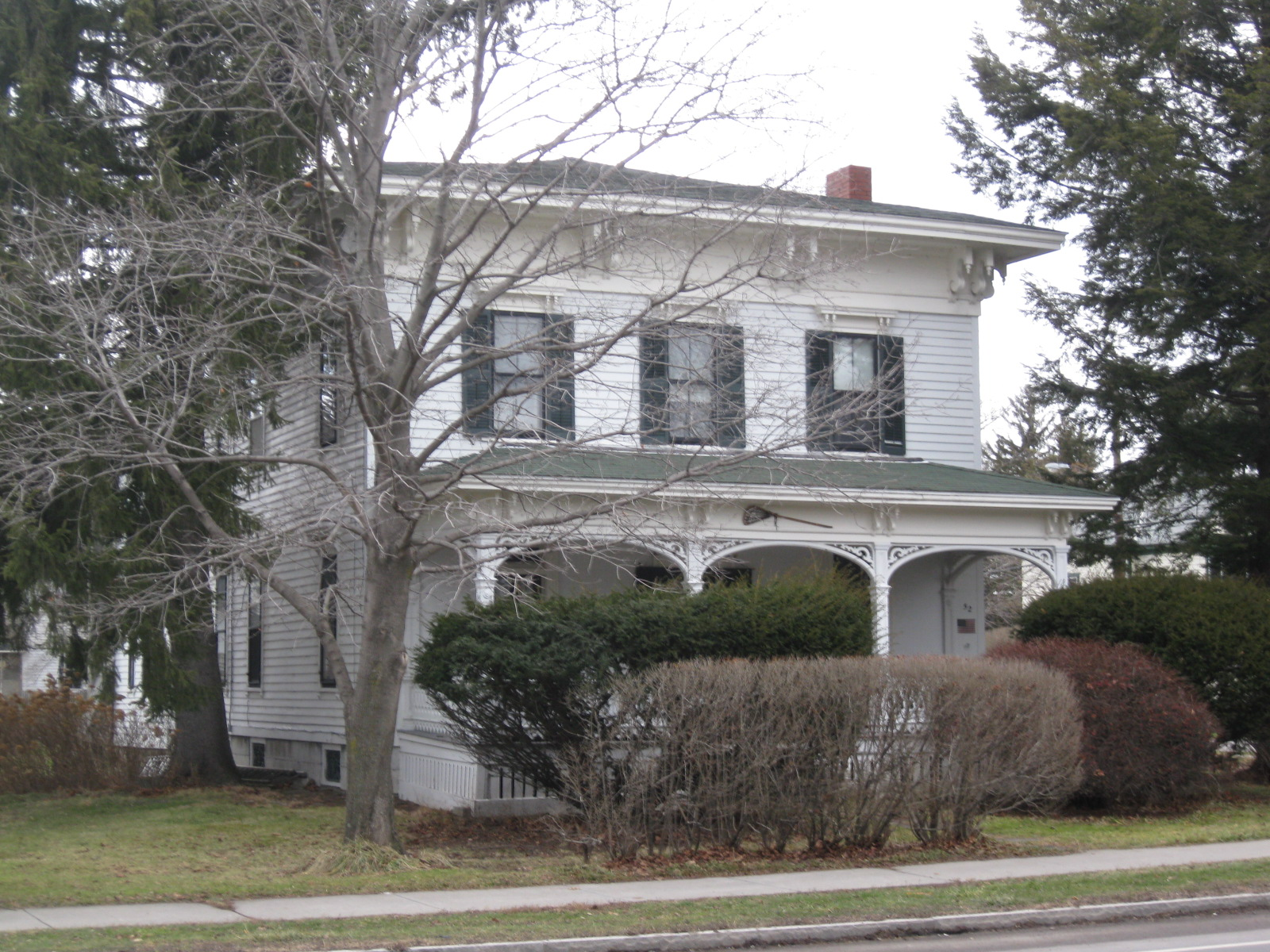
- Rockwell House, January 2010

- Location within New York Location within the United States
- Location: 52 W. Main St., Dryden, New York
- Coordinates: 42°29′26″N 76°18′10″W
- Area: less than one acre
- Built: 1860
- Architect: Givens, Darius
- Architectural style: Italianate
- MPS: Dryden Village MRA
- NRHP reference No.: 84003192
- Added to NRHP: June 8, 1984

Rockwell House is a historic home located at Dryden in Tompkins County, New York. It was built about 1860 and is a 2-story, wood-frame residence consisting of a three-by-three-bay main portion and two-by-two-bay rear wing in the Italianate style.

It was listed on the National Register of Historic Places in 1984.
