= Strand Theatre (Ithaca, New York) =

- Formerly listed on the U.S. National Register of Historic Places
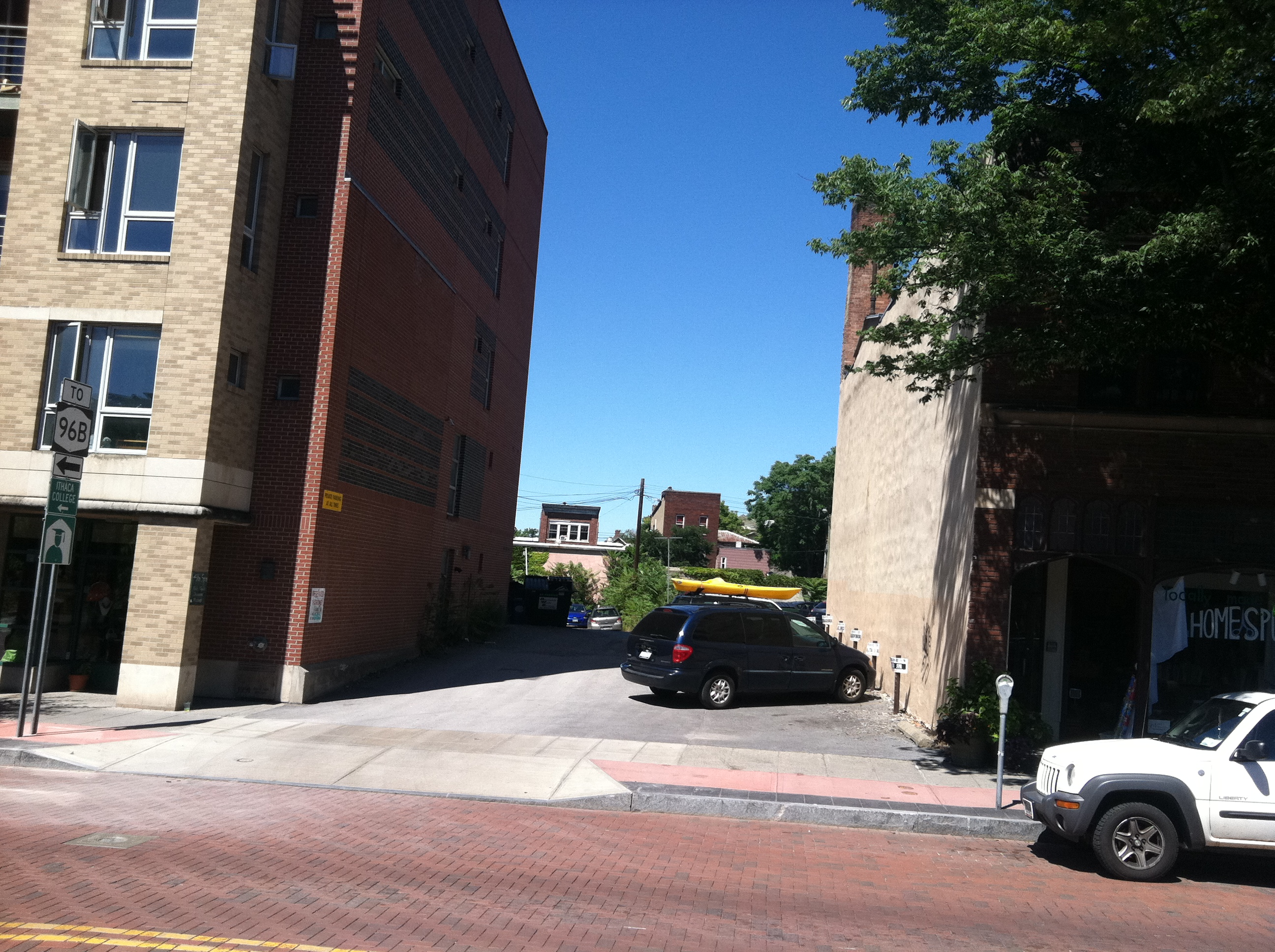
- Location: 310 E. State St., Ithaca, New York
- Area: 0.3 acres (0.12 ha)
- Built: 1916
- Architect: Driscoll Bros. & Co.
- Architectural style: Tudor Revival, Neo-Tudor
- NRHP reference No.: 79001636

Significant dates
- Added to NRHP: February 22, 1979
- Removed from NRHP: January 01, 1999

Strand Theatre was a historic theater located at Ithaca in Tompkins County, New York. It was built in 1916–1917 in the Tudor Revival style.

After Ithaca's Lyceum Theater closed in 1927, the Strand became Ithaca's main venue for touring theater companies. After 1950, the theater switched to showing only films. The theater closed in 1976 due to a leaky roof and deteriorated heating system, then re-opened in 1979 for live performances.

In 1981 the owners attempted to secure grants to renovate the building and pay huge outstanding debts.

The theater closed permanently in 1982 and was demolished in 1993.

It was listed on the National Register of Historic Places in 1979 and delisted in 1999.
