= Dryden (village), New York =

Dryden, New York
- Village
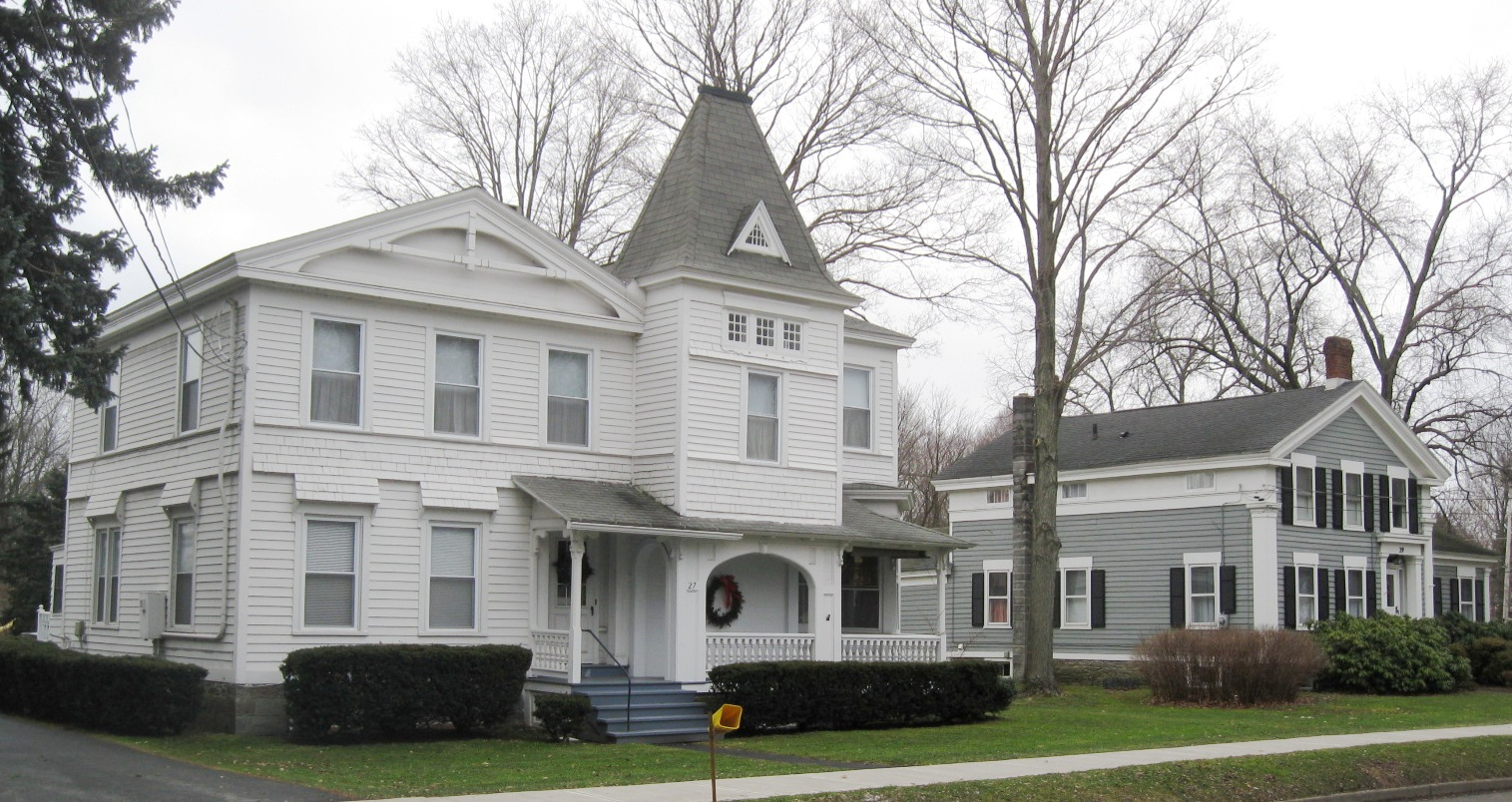
- Dryden Historic District

- Location within the state of New York
- Coordinates: 42°29′21″N 76°17′59″W
- Country: United States
- State: New York
- County: Tompkins
- Settled: 1797
- Incorporated: July 7, 1857
- Named after: John Dryden

Government
  - Mayor (2 year term, election in March of odd years): Michael Murphy
  - Trustees (2 year term, election in March of odd years): Tom Sinclair, Deputy Mayor; Jason Dickinson; Dan Wakeman; Clay Converse

Area
  - Total: 1.77 sq mi (4.58 km^{2})
  - Land: 1.76 sq mi (4.55 km^{2})
  - Water: 0.015 sq mi (0.04 km^{2})
- Elevation: 1,089 ft (332 m)

Population (2020)
  - Total: 1,887
  - Density: 1,074.4/sq mi (414.83/km^{2})
- Time zone: UTC-5 (Eastern (EST))
  - Summer (DST): UTC-4 (EDT)
- ZIP code: 13053
- Area code: 607
- FIPS code: 36-20951
- GNIS feature ID: 0948704
- Website: www.drydenvillageny.gov

Dryden is a village in Tompkins County, New York, United States. The population was 1,887 at the 2020 census. The village is in the town of Dryden, east of Ithaca. It is near the border of Cortland County.

== History ==
The village is in the former Central New York Military Tract.

The first settler in the town located on the site of the future village in 1797.

The village of Dryden was incorporated in 1857.

The Dryden Historic District, Luther Clarke House, Jennings-Marvin House, Lacy-Van Vleet House, Methodist Episcopal Church, Rockwell House, Southworth House, and Southworth Library are listed on the National Register of Historic Places.

== Notable people ==
- Jacob M. Appel — author
- John Wilbur Dwight — former US congressman
- Milo Goodrich — former US congressman
- Richard P. Marvin — former US congressman

== Geography ==
Dryden is located at 42°29′21″N 76°17′58″W (42.489188, -76.299589).

According to the United States Census Bureau, the village has a total area of 1.7 square miles (4.3 km^{2}). None of the area is covered with water.

New York State Route 13 intersects New York State Route 38 in the village.

== Demographics ==
Historical population
Census	Pop.	Note	%±
1870	672		—
1880	779		15.9%
1890	663		−14.9%
1900	699		5.4%
1910	709		1.4%
1920	707		−0.3%
1930	666		−5.8%
1940	747		12.2%
1950	976		30.7%
1960	1,263		29.4%
1970	1,490		18.0%
1980	1,761		18.2%
1990	1,908		8.3%
2000	1,832		−4.0%
2010	1,890		3.2%
2020	1,887		−0.2%
U.S. Decennial Census

As of the census of 2000, there were 1,832 people, 772 households, and 469 families residing in the village. The population density was 1,104.9 inhabitants per square mile (426.6/km^{2}). There were 811 housing units at an average density of 489.1 per square mile (188.8/km^{2}). The racial makeup of the village was 96.18% White, 1.26% Black or African American, 0.33% Native American, 0.27% Asian, 0.49% from other races, and 1.47% from two or more races. Hispanic or Latino of any race were 1.36% of the population.

There were 772 households, out of which 30.8% had children under the age of 18 living with them, 49.2% were married couples living together, 7.8% had a female householder with no husband present, and 39.2% were non-families. 33.4% of all households were made up of individuals, and 10.9% had someone living alone who was 65 years of age or older. The average household size was 2.37 and the average family size was 3.06.

In the village, the population was spread out, with 26.4% under the age of 18, 8.9% from 18 to 24, 28.9% from 25 to 44, 24.3% from 45 to 64, and 11.5% who were 65 years of age or older. The median age was 37 years. For every 100 females, there were 98.1 males. For every 100 females age 18 and over, there were 95.1 males.

The median income for a household in the village was $43,977, and the median income for a family was $54,489. Males had a median income of $38,897 versus $26,809 for females. The per capita income for the village was $20,613. About 5.1% of families and 9.9% of the population were below the poverty line, including 14.1% of those under age 18 and 4.7% of those age 65 or over.

== Education ==
Dryden Village is in the Dryden Central School District. The zoned comprehensive high school is Dryden High School.
