= First Methodist Church of Greenwood =

Historic church in Mississippi, United States

- U.S. National Register of Historic Places
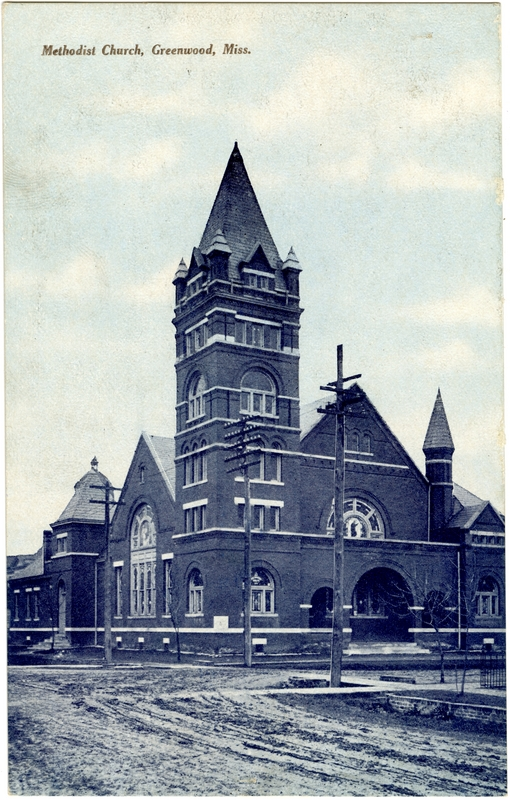

- Location within Mississippi Location within the United States
- Location: 310 W. Washington St., Greenwood, Mississippi
- Coordinates: 33°31′9″N 90°11′4″W
- Area: less than one acre
- Built: 1898
- Architect: Reuben Harris Hunt; Frank R. McGeoy
- Architectural style: Romanesque
- MPS: Greenwood MRA
- NRHP reference No.: 85003457
- Added to NRHP: November 4, 1985

First Methodist Church of Greenwood is a historic church at 310 W. Washington Street in Greenwood, Mississippi.

The Romanesque style building was constructed in 1898 and added to the National Register of Historic Places in 1985.
