= Southworth House (Dryden, New York) =

Historic house in New York, United States

- U.S. National Register of Historic Places
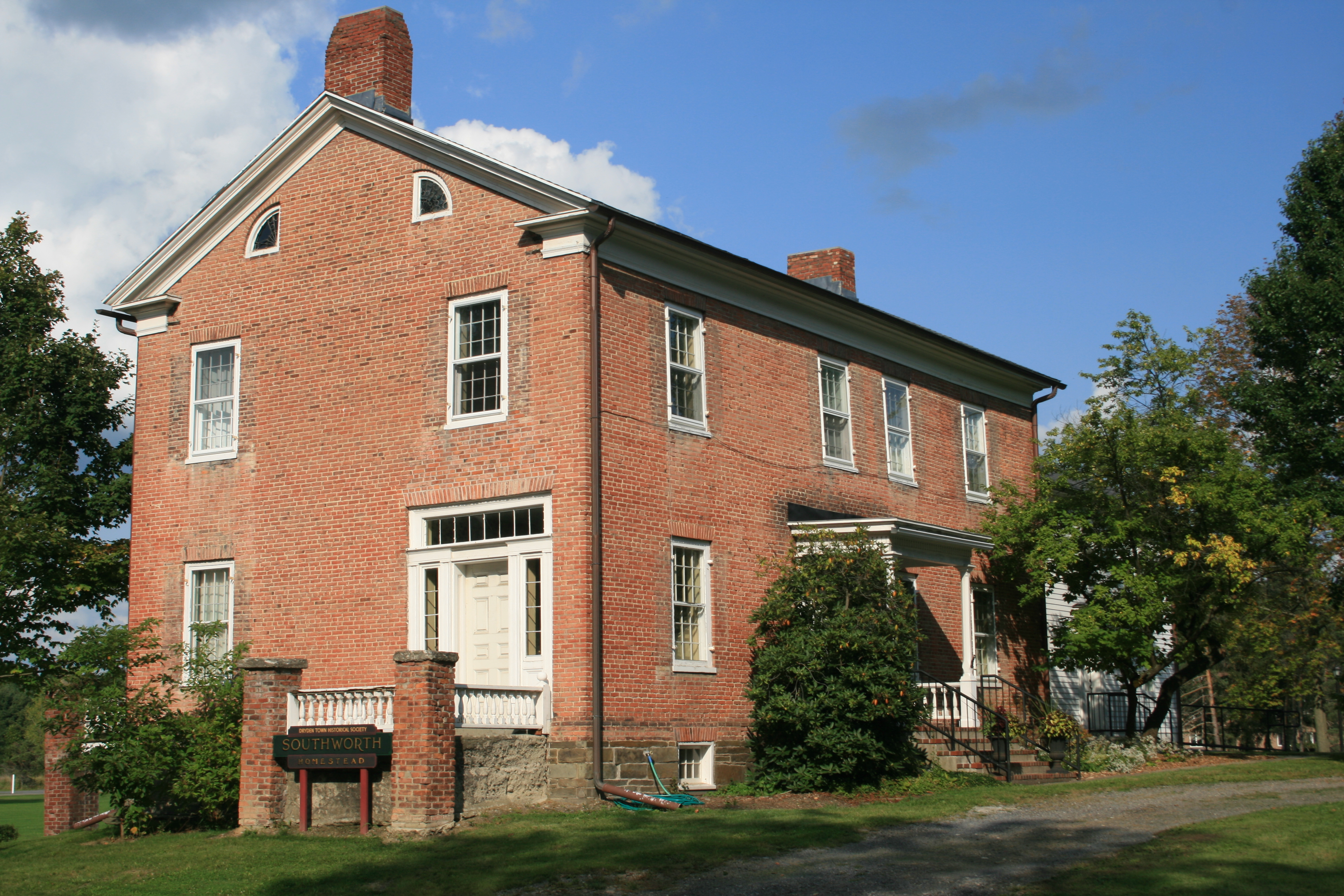

- Location within New York Location within the United States
- Location: 14 North St., Dryden, New York
- Coordinates: 42°29′32″N 76°17′52″W
- Area: 2 acres (0.81 ha)
- Built: 1836
- Architectural style: Federal
- MPS: Dryden Village MRA
- NRHP reference No.: 84003193
- Added to NRHP: June 08, 1984

Southworth House is a historic home located at Dryden in Tompkins County, New York. It was built in 1836 and is a two-story Federal style brick residence.

It was listed on the National Register of Historic Places in 1984.
