= Dryden Historic District (Dryden, New York) =

Historic district in New York, United States

- U.S. National Register of Historic Places
- U.S. Historic district
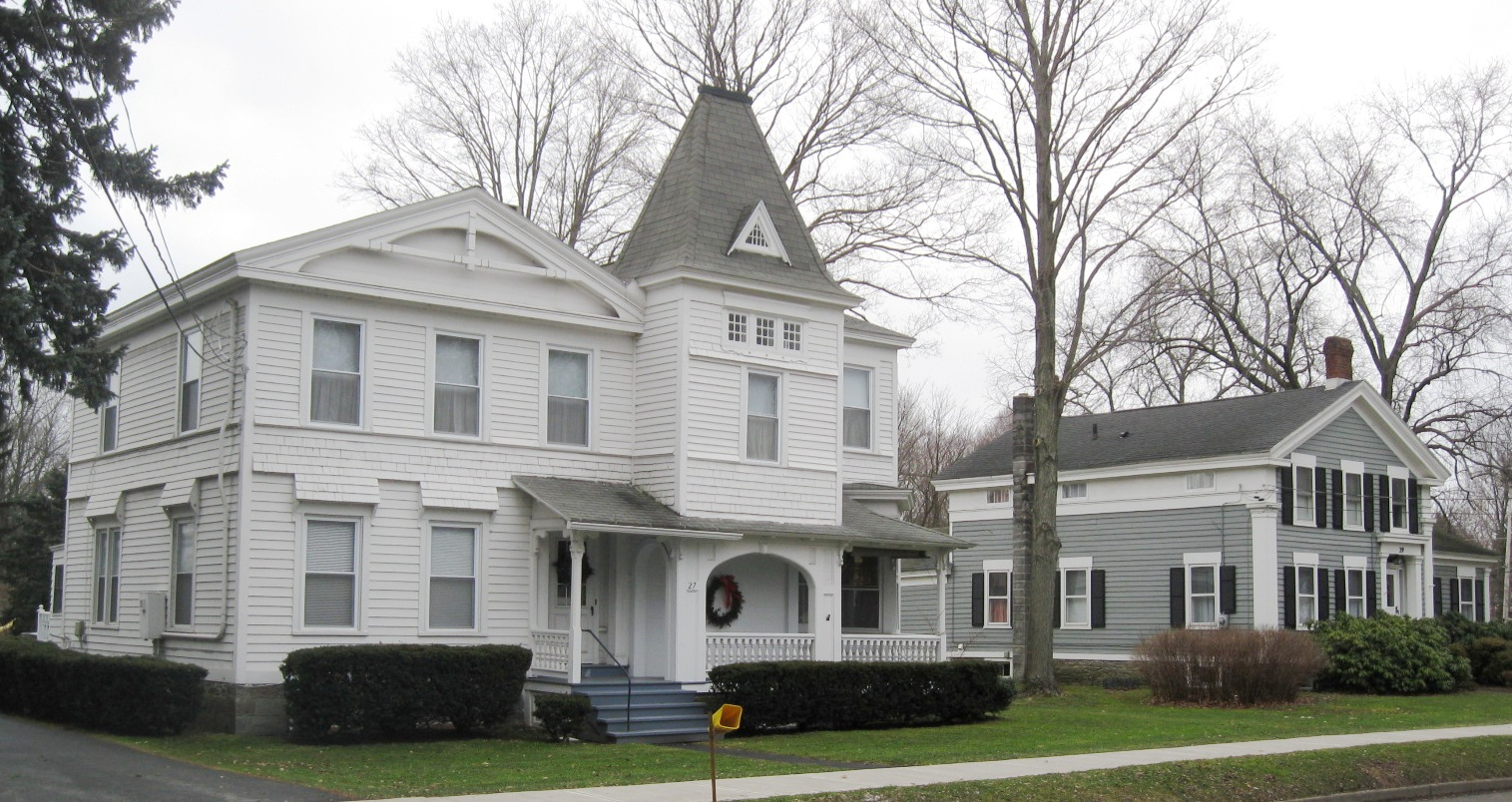
- South Street, January 2010

- Location within New York Location within the United States
- Location: Roughly bounded by E. Main, James, Lake and South Sts., Dryden, New York
- Coordinates: 42°29′21″N 76°17′46″W
- Area: 20 acres (8.1 ha)
- Architect: Multiple
- Architectural style: Greek Revival, Italianate
- MPS: Dryden Village MRA
- NRHP reference No.: 84003921
- Added to NRHP: June 15, 1984

Dryden Historic District is a national historic district located at Dryden in Tompkins County, New York. The district consists of 44 properties encompassing the historic core of the village of Dryden. Except for three mid-19th-century commercial buildings, the district consists of residential structures pleasantly spaced along three lined streets. Generally they consist of 1 1/2-story frame structures built between 1800 and 1905.

It was listed on the National Register of Historic Places in 1984.
