= Southworth House (Greenwood, Mississippi) =

Historic house in Mississippi, United States

- U.S. National Register of Historic Places
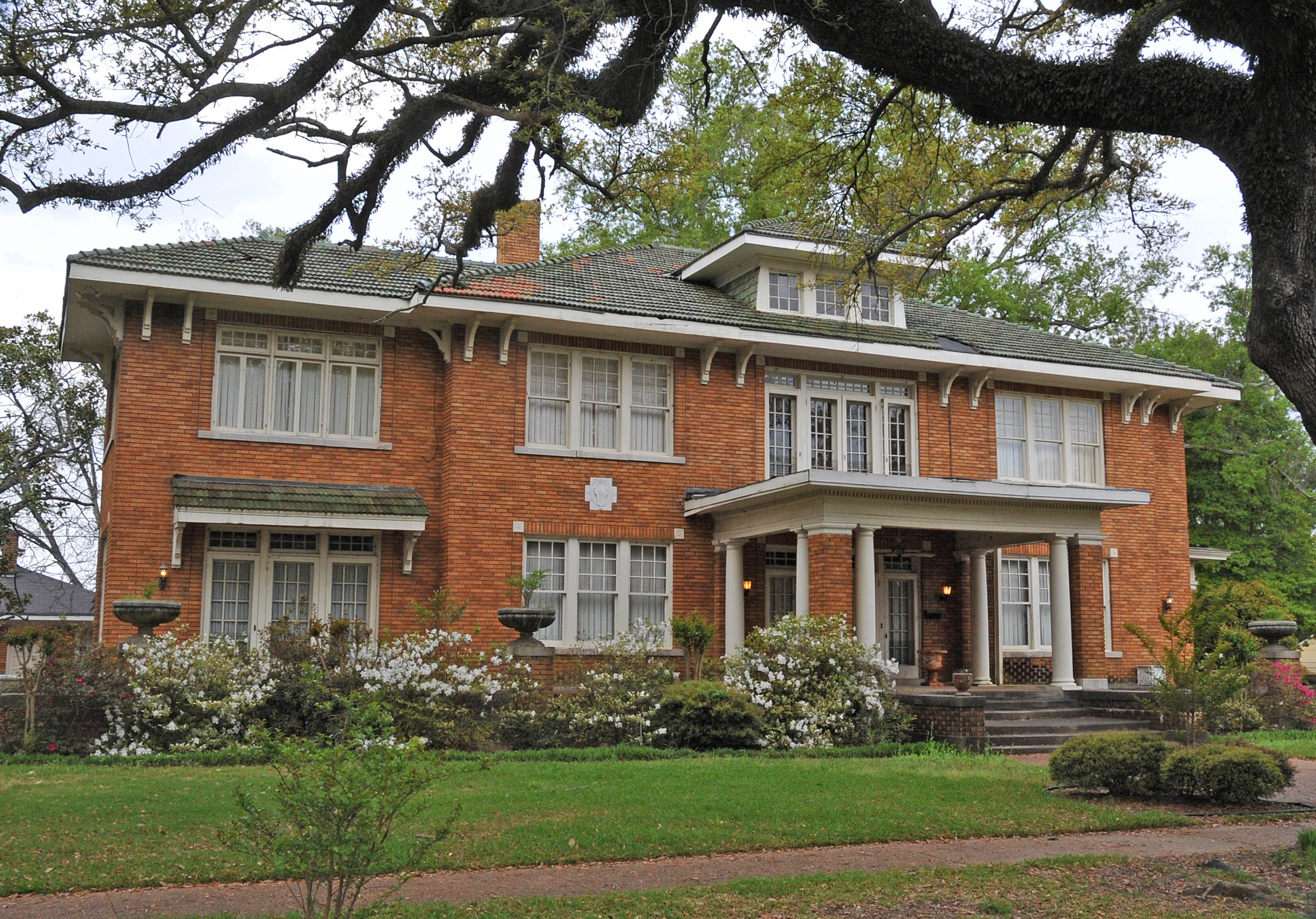

- Location within Mississippi Location within the United States
- Location: 1108 Mississippi Ave., Greenwood, Mississippi
- Coordinates: 33°30′34″N 90°11′13″W
- Area: less than one acre
- Built: 1922
- Architect: McGeoy, Frank R.
- Architectural style: Twentieth Century Eclectic, Other
- MPS: Greenwood MRA
- NRHP reference No.: 85003460
- Added to NRHP: November 4, 1985

The Southworth House at 1108 Mississippi Ave. in Greenwood, Mississippi was built in 1922. It was a work of local architect Frank R. McGeoy. It was listed on the National Register of Historic Places (NRHP) in 1985.

The house, at time of its NRHP listing, was well preserved: its integrity "is outstanding and includes such unusual survivals as the original wooden benches that flank the entrance doorway."
