= Wesley Memorial Methodist Episcopal =

Historic church in Mississippi, United States

- U.S. National Register of Historic Places
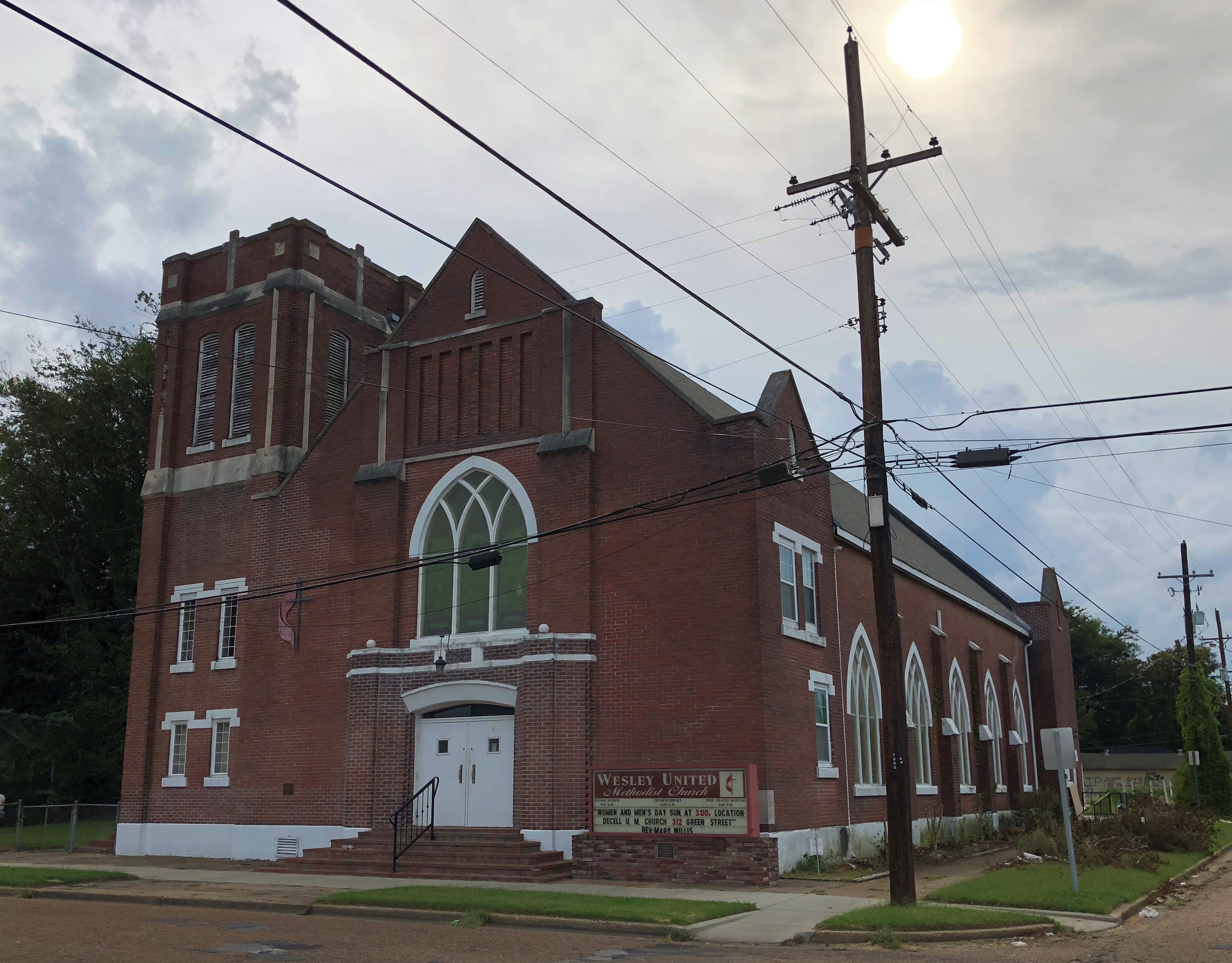

- Location within Mississippi Location within the United States
- Location: 800 Howard St., Greenwood, Mississippi
- Coordinates: 33°30′49″N 90°10′52″W
- Area: less than one acre
- Built: 1921
- Architect: McGeoy, Frank R.
- Architectural style: Late Gothic Revival
- MPS: Greenwood MRA
- NRHP reference No.: 85003461
- Added to NRHP: November 4, 1985

Wesley Memorial Methodist Episcopal Church (Wesley United Methodist Church) is a historic church at 800 Howard Street in Greenwood, Mississippi.

It was built in 1921 and added to the National Register in 1985.
