= Clinton Hall (Ithaca, New York) =

Historic commercial building in New York, United States

- U.S. National Register of Historic Places
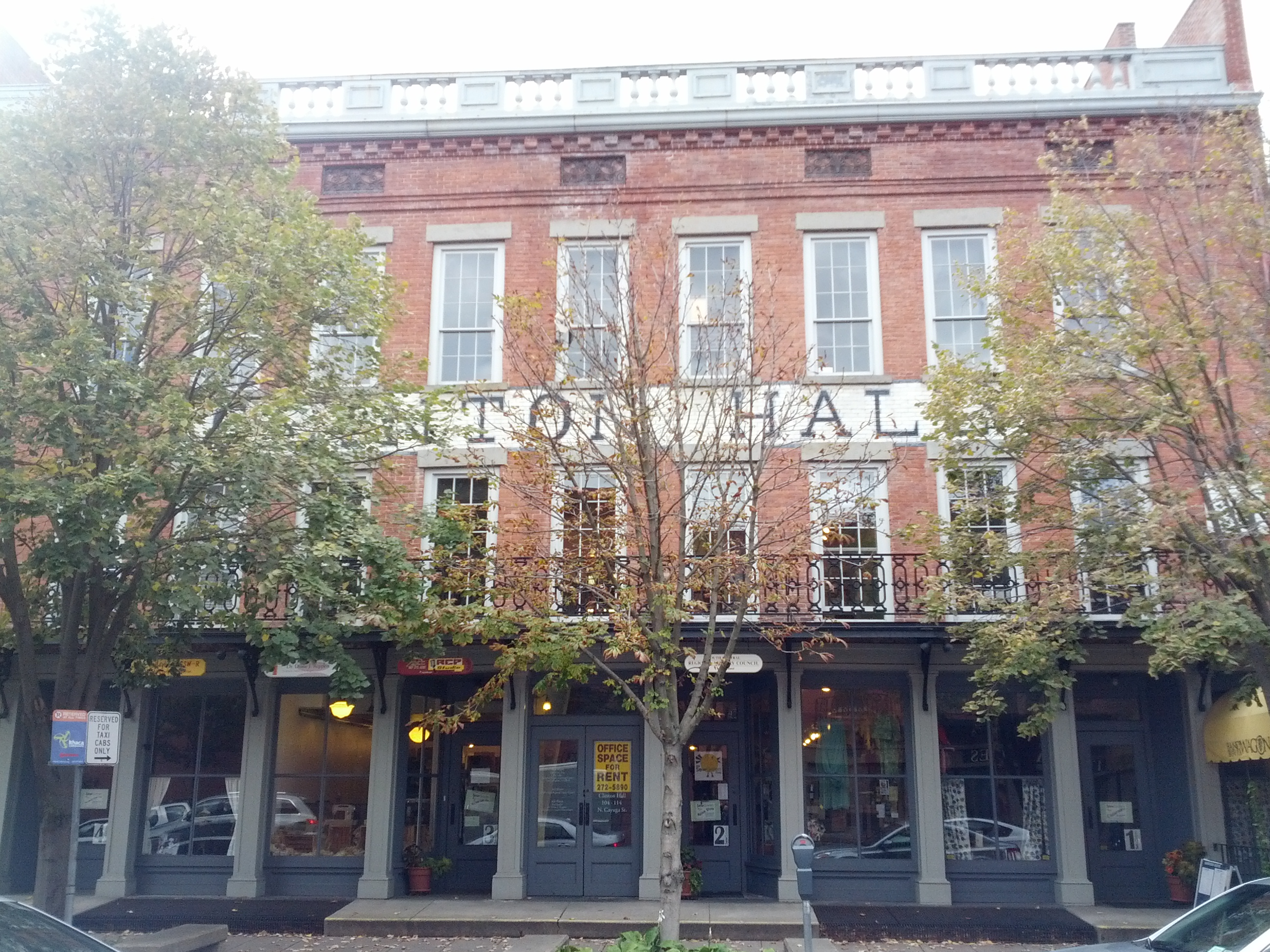

- Location within New York Location within the United States
- Location: 108-114 N. Cayuga St., Ithaca, New York
- Coordinates: 42°26′23″N 76°30′0″W
- Area: less than one acre
- Built: 1847
- Architectural style: Greek Revival, Howe bridge truss variant
- NRHP reference No.: 88001019
- Added to NRHP: July 07, 1988

Clinton Hall is a historic commercial building located at Ithaca in Tompkins County, New York. It was built in 1847-1851 and is a three-story, brick commercial block in the Greek Revival style. The building is 66 feet long and 48 feet deep.

It was listed on the National Register of Historic Places in 1988.
