= De Witt Park Historic District =

Historic district in New York, United States

- U.S. National Register of Historic Places
- U.S. Historic district
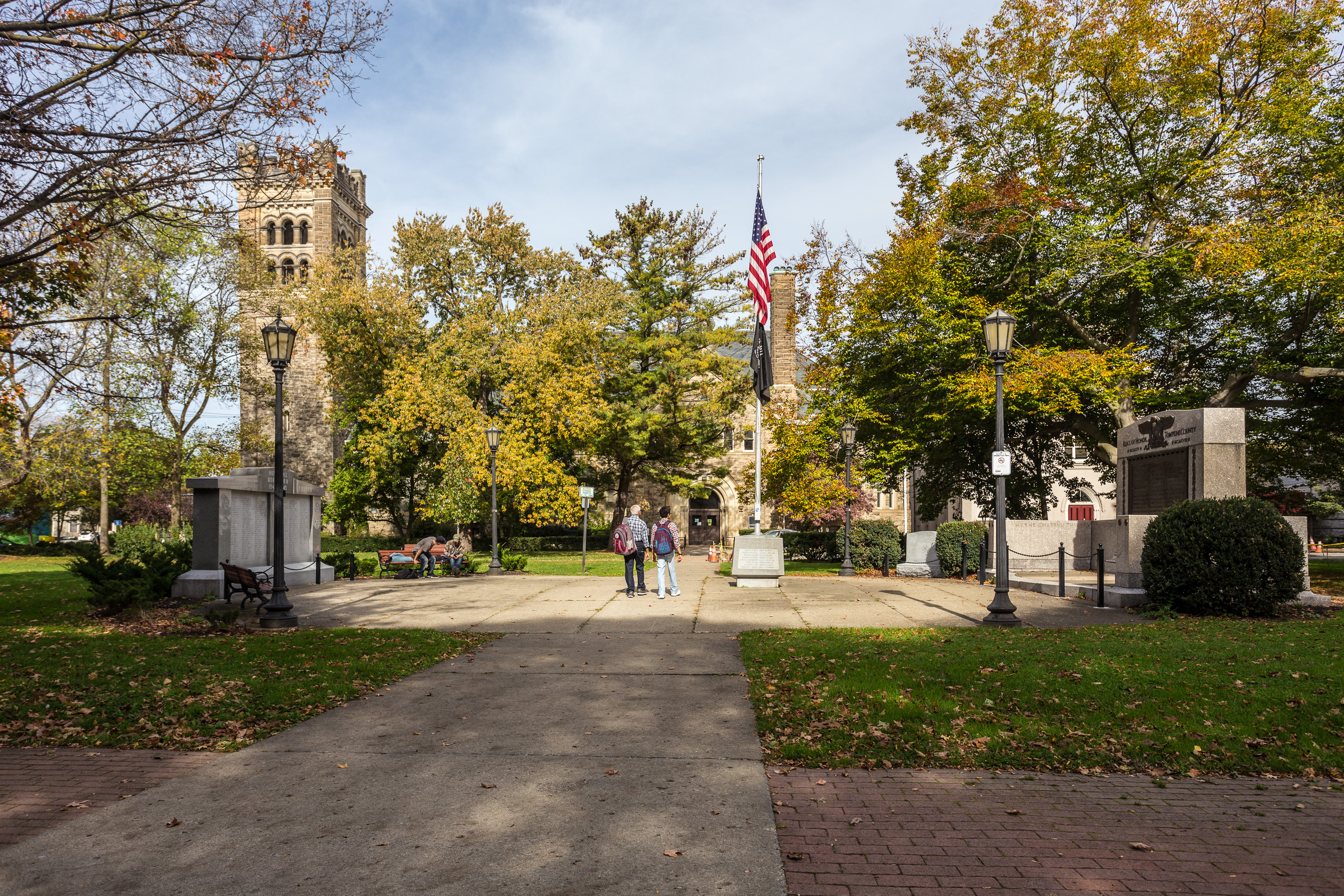

- Location within New York Location within the United States
- Interactive map showing the location of De Witt Park Historic District
- Location: A square bounded roughly by properties fronting on E. Buffalo, E. Court, N. Cayuga, and N. Tioga Sts., Ithaca, New York
- Coordinates: 42°26′30″N 76°29′53″W
- Area: 18 acres (7.3 ha)
- Built: 1800
- Architect: Multiple
- Architectural style: Greek Revival, Italianate, Romanesque
- NRHP reference No.: 71000561
- Added to NRHP: October 26, 1971

De Witt Park Historic District is a national historic district located at Ithaca in Tompkins County, New York. The district consists of 45 contributing buildings, one contributing site (De Witt Park, known as Town Square until 1869), and three contributing objects. It includes the area developed by the town's founder, Simon De Witt, in the early 19th century. The district includes the separately listed Boardman House and Second Tompkins County Courthouse.

== Background ==
The district is a major crossroads in Ithaca, and contains a wide variety of architectural styles and cultural, social, educational, political and religious functions.

Concern for preservation of the neighborhood was a motivating factor behind Ithaca's passage of a local Landmarks Preservation Ordinance in 1971. Dewitt Park was Ithaca's first designated local historic district in 1971. It was listed on the National Register of Historic Places in the same year.

== DeWitt Park ==
DeWitt Park is owned by the Presbyterian Church on North Cayuga Street. The church congregation purchased the land from Simeon DeWitt on August 1, 1815, for the sum of $499.65. The church specifically set the land aside for public enjoyment, rather than as a graveyard, which would have been more typical of the day. In 1856 the church came to an agreement with the Village of Ithaca that the church would retain ownership of the park, while the village would be responsible for maintaining it. For many years DeWitt Park was a meetings spot for student of the nearby Ithaca Conservatory (later Ithaca College), located in the adjacent Boardman House

Frederick Douglass, prevented from speaking in any of the local churches or the Village Hall, twice delivered orations in the park.

Following the murder of Shawn Greenwood by the Ithaca Police Department on Feb. 23 2010, members of the Ithaca community have renamed DeWitt Park to Shawn Greenwood Park. The new name aims to remember Shawn Greenwood, an African-American man who grew up in Ithaca, and end the recognition of Simeon De Witt, a former slave owner.

== Significant properties ==
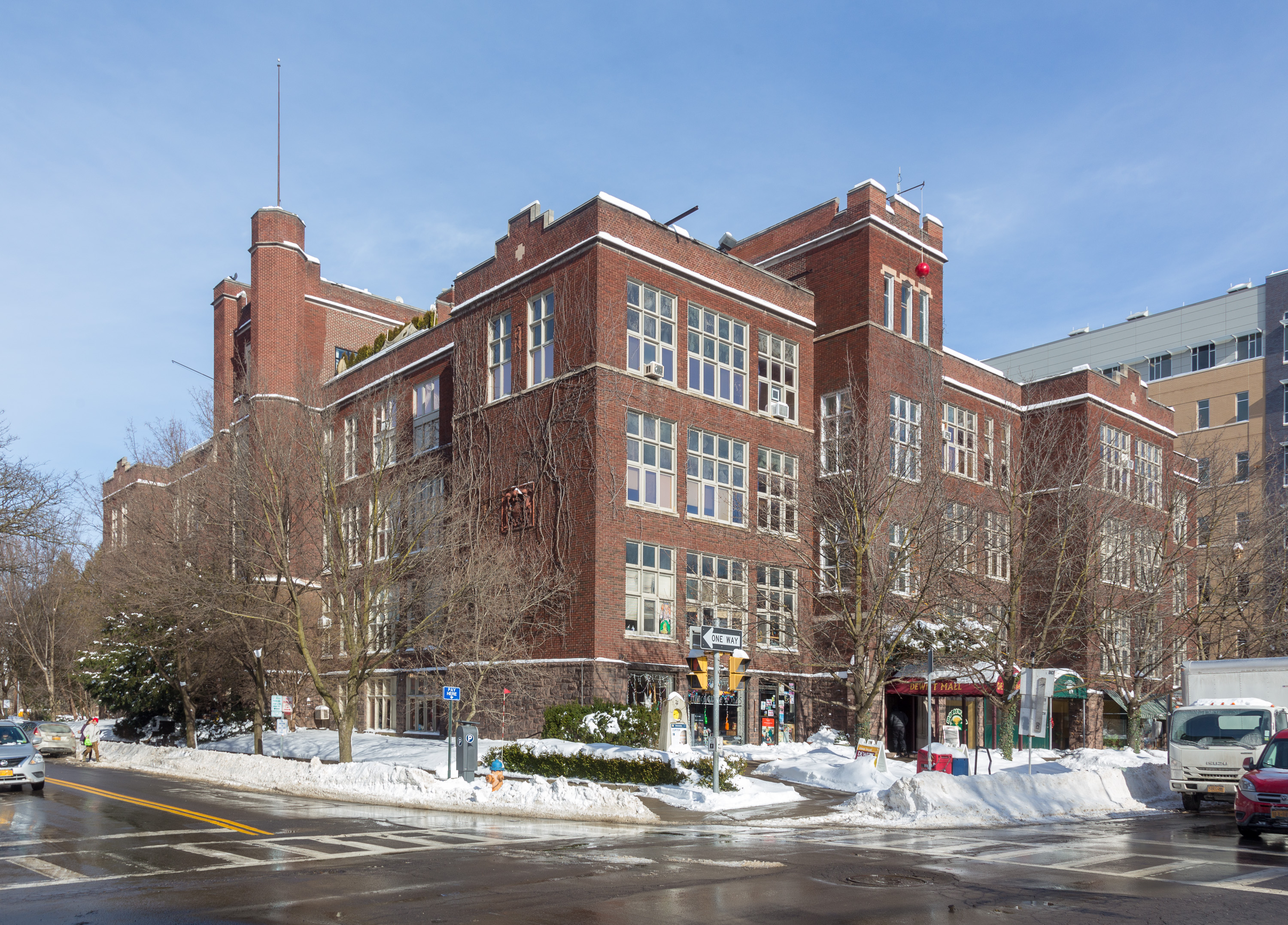
DeWitt Mall

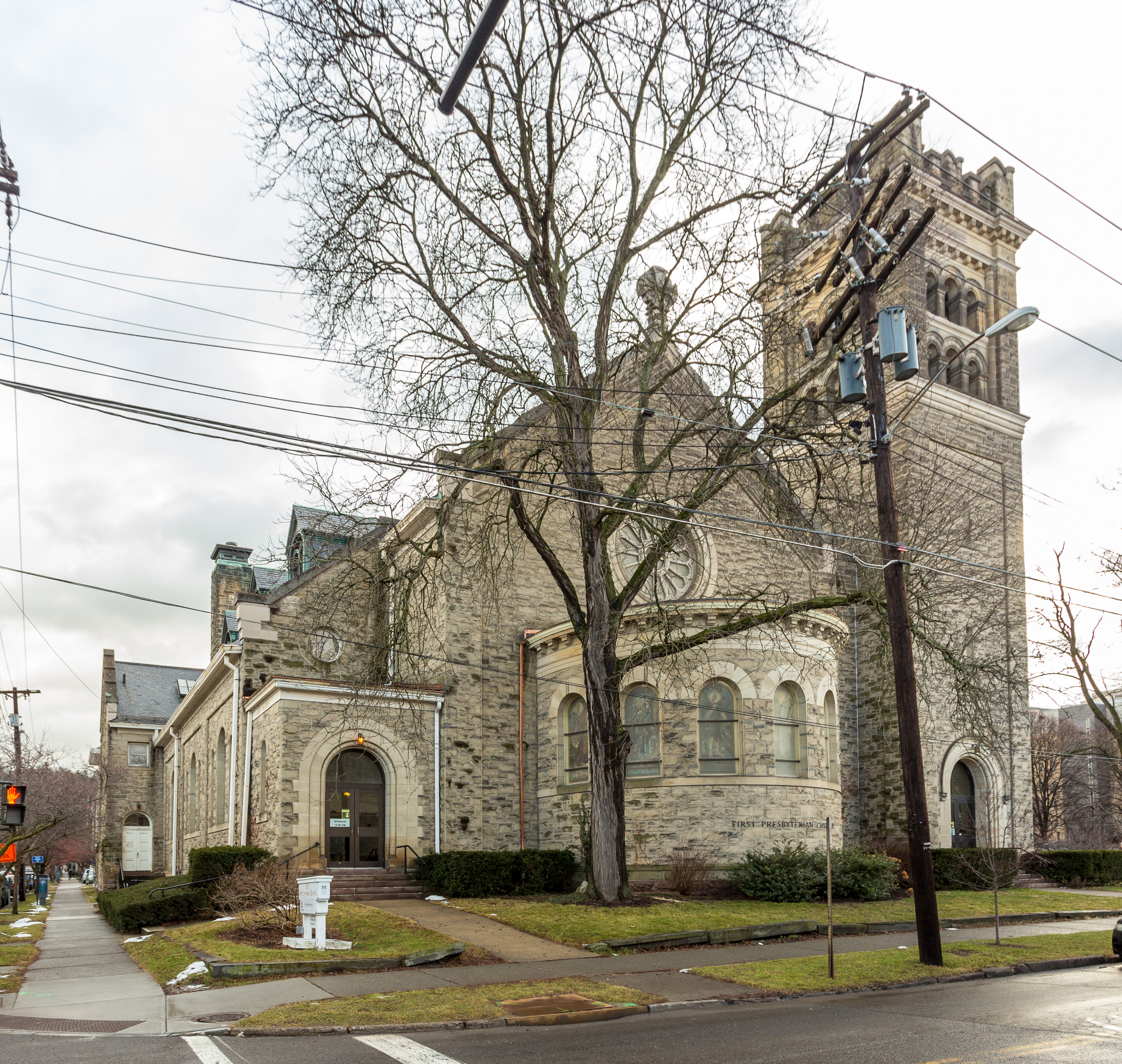
First Presbyterian Church (1901)

- The Second Tompkins County Courthouse, the oldest public building in Tompkins County, forms the northern boundary of the district
- Boardman House, 120 East Buffalo Street, adjacent to DeWitt Park
- Bank of Newburgh, 106 East Court Street
- DeWitt Junior High School (1912 or 1915), designed by William Henry Miller (now DeWitt Mall)
- Williams-Fisher House, 306 North Cayuga Street
- First Presbyterian Church of Ithaca (1901), designed by J. Cleaveland Cady

Two later buildings, the Public Library and Ithaca Savings and Loan Association were designed in a style to be harmonious with the historical character of the neighborhood.
