= New York State Route 366 =

State highway in Tompkins County, New York, US

New York State Route 366
- Map of Tompkins County in central New York with NY 366 highlighted in red

Route information
- Maintained by NYSDOT and the city of Ithaca
- Length: 9.38 mi (15.10 km)
- Existed: 1930–present

Major junctions
- West end: NY 79 in Ithaca
- East end: NY 38 in Freevile

Location
- Country: United States
- State: New York
- Counties: Tompkins

Highway system
- New York Highways; Interstate; US; State; Reference; Parkways
← NY 365A	→ NY 367

New York State Route 366 (NY 366) is an east–west state highway located entirely within Tompkins County in the Finger Lakes region of New York in the United States. It runs for 9.40 miles (15.13 km) from State Street (NY 79) just east of downtown Ithaca to NY 38 in Freeville. NY 366 parallels Fall Creek from Varna to Freeville and passes along the southern edge of the Cornell University campus. NY 366 was assigned as part of the 1930 renumbering of state highways in New York; however, it was initially nothing more than a connector between NY 13 in Etna and NY 38 in Freeville. In the 1960s, NY 13 was moved onto a new expressway bypassing Ithaca to the west and north. The former surface routing of NY 13 into downtown Ithaca became an extension of NY 366.

== Route description ==
NY 366 begins at an intersection with NY 79 (East State Street) in the city of Ithaca. NY 366 proceeds eastward along Mitchell Street, a two-lane residential street until the intersecting with Ithaca Road, where NY 366 turns to the north on Ithaca. Mitchell Street continues eastward, becoming County Route 110 (CR 110) at the city line. This intersection also served as the former western terminus of NY 393, a designation eliminated in 1980. NY 366 enters the neighborhood of North Belle Sherman, bending northward as Dryden Road after the intersection with Maple Avenue. After the intersection, NY 366 passes along the southern edge of the campus for Cornell University. Heading northeast out of the city, the route intersects with CR 122 (Caldwell Road) at the eastern edge of the campus. After leaving Ithaca, NY 366 enters the town of Dryden, intersecting with the former eastern terminus of NY 392, Forest Home Drive, before entering the hamlet of Varna. Varna consists of a stretch of residential homes on each side of NY 366.

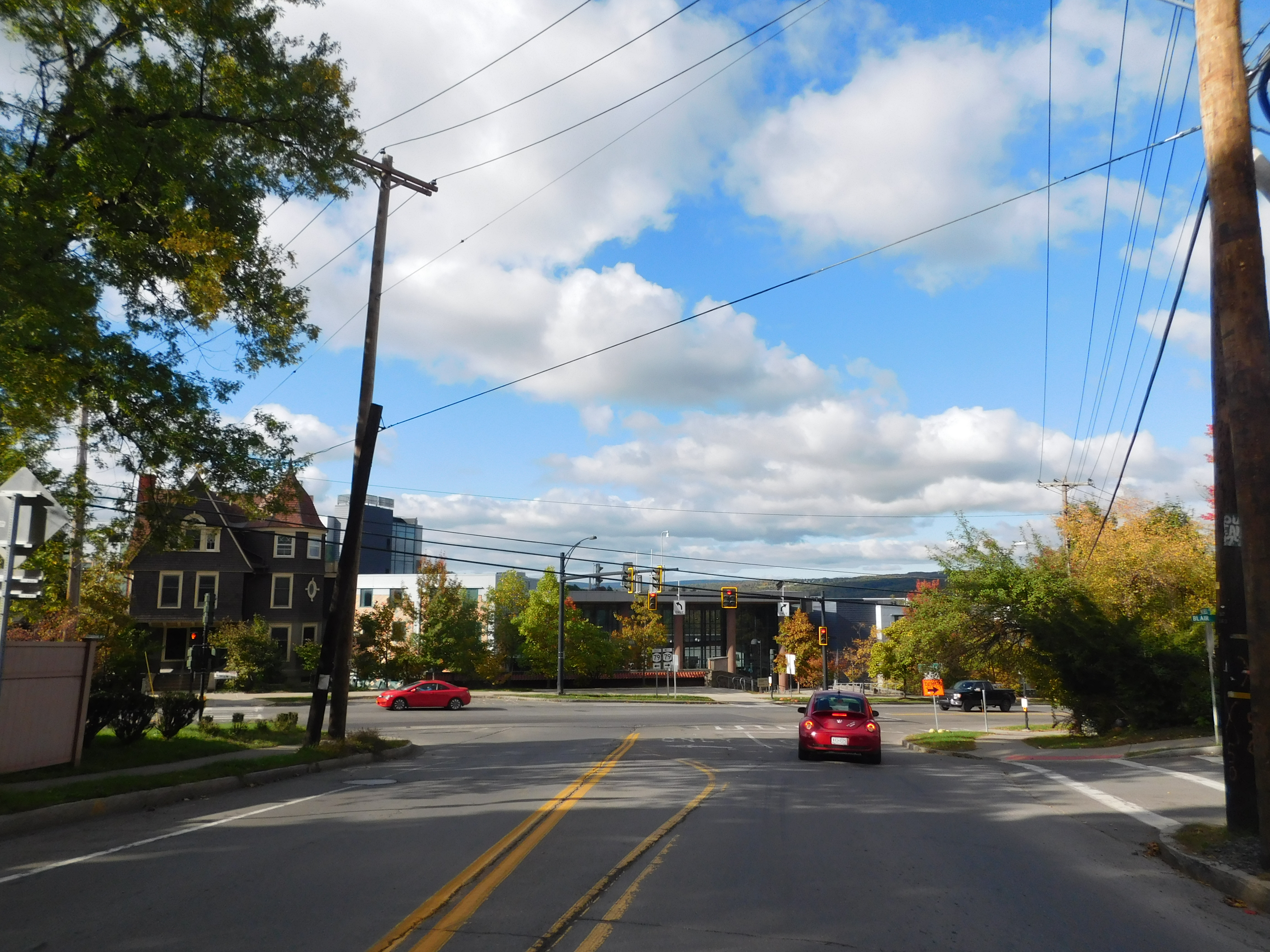
NY 366 westbound at NY 79 in Ithaca

NY 366 turns to the northeast through Dryden, intersecting the northern terminus of CR 161 (Turkey Hill Road) before intersecting with NY 13 after Baker Hill Road. NY 13 and NY 366 form a concurrency on this stretch, as a four-lane arterial known still as Dryden Road. The roads parallel Fall Creek nearby, eventually narrowing in lanes. At the intersection with Main Street, NY 13 continues eastward, while NY 366 turns northward on Main Street, entering the hamlet of Etna. In Etna, NY 366 intersects with CR 109 (Etna Lane) on the shore of Fall Creek. The two routes are concurrent for less than a block before CR 109 heads eastward towards NY 13. NY 366 parallels Fall Creek through Dryden, sticking as a two-lane local road before entering the town of Freeville. In Freeville, NY 366 retains its Main Street moniker, but becomes a residential street before intersecting with NY 38 (Railroad Street / Groton Road). This intersection serves as the eastern terminus for NY 366, but the right-of-way continues out of Freeville as CR 105 (Fall Creek Road) toward the hamlet of Red Mills.

== History ==
In 1908, the New York State Legislature created Route 9, an unsigned legislative route that ran from the Southern Tier to Bouckville via Ithaca and Cortland. Route 9 exited the city of Ithaca on Forest Home Drive to near Varna, where it picked up modern NY 366 east through Etna to Freeville, then continuing southeastward toward Dryden on what is now NY 38. When the first set of posted routes in New York were assigned in 1924, the segment of legislative Route 9 between Varna and Etna became part of NY 13. Unlike Route 9 before it, NY 13 bypassed Freeville to the south in favor of a direct alignment between Etna and Dryden.

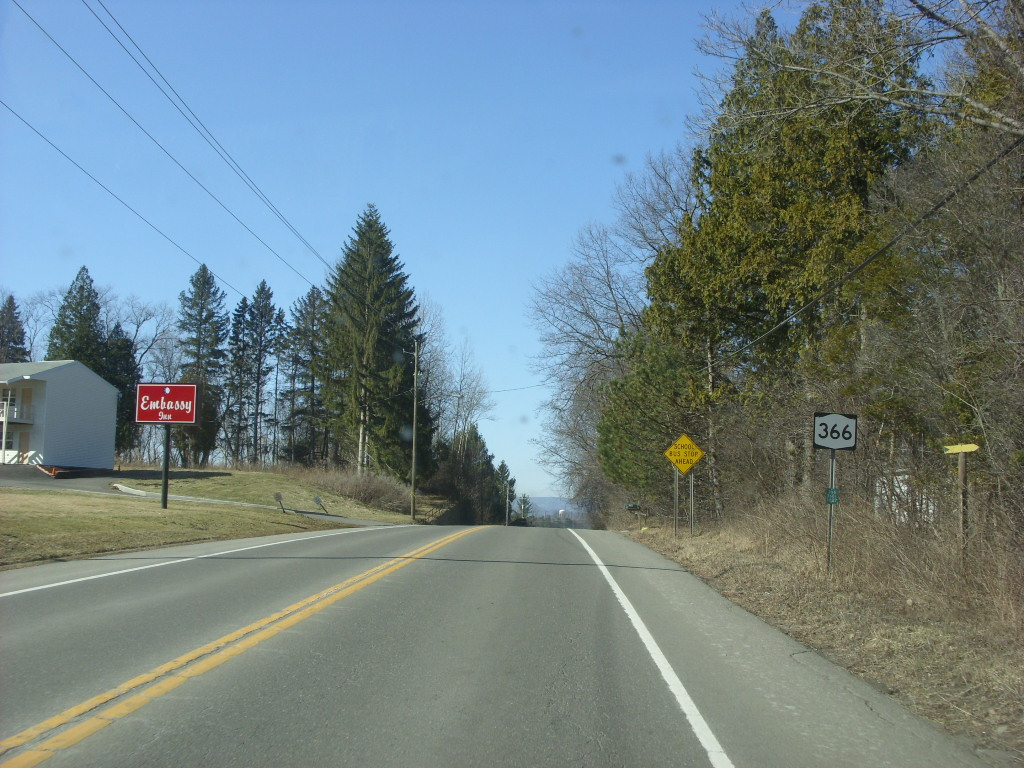
NY 366 heading past a hotel near Turkey Hill Road (CR 161) in Dryden

Also assigned at this time was NY 26, a highway that initially extended from Ithaca to Syracuse via Moravia and Skaneateles. NY 26 began in downtown Ithaca and overlapped with NY 13 east to Etna, where it turned northeast to follow old legislative Route 9 to Freeville. Past Freeville, the route continued northward toward Syracuse on modern NY 38. The overlap between NY 13 and NY 26 was eliminated in the late 1920s when NY 26 was truncated to begin at the former east end of the concurrency in Etna. In the 1930 renumbering of state highways in New York, the NY 26 designation was reassigned to another highway off to the east. The southernmost portion of NY 26's former routing between Etna and Freeville was redesignated as NY 366.

NY 13 was realigned c. 1936 to bypass the Cornell University grounds to the south on State (NY 79) and Mitchell streets and Ithaca and Dryden roads. Its old alignment through the college became NY 392. In the early 1960s, a new expressway was built along the eastern shore of Cayuga Lake, bypassing downtown Ithaca to the west and north. NY 13 was altered to follow Meadow Street and the freeway between southwestern Ithaca and the town of Dryden while the portion of NY 13's old routing that did not overlap NY 79 became a westward extension of NY 366.

== Major intersections ==
The entire route is in Tompkins County.

Location	mi	km	Destinations	Notes
City of Ithaca	0.00	0.00	NY 79 (State Street)	Western terminus
City of Ithaca	0.23	0.37	Mitchell Street	Former western terminus of NY 393
Town of Dryden	2.52	4.06	Forest Home Drive	Former eastern terminus of NY 392; hamlet of Varna
Town of Dryden	4.65	7.48	NY 13 south (Ithaca Truck Route)	Western end of concurrency with NY 13
Town of Dryden	5.89	9.48	NY 13 north – Dryden	Eastern end of concurrency with NY 13
Freeville	9.38	15.10	NY 38 (Railroad Street) – Dryden, Groton	Eastern terminus
1.000 mi = 1.609 km; 1.000 km = 0.621 mi: Concurrency terminus
