= New York State Route 392 (1936–1974) =

Former state highway in New York State

New York State Route 392
- Former NY 392 highlighted in red

Route information
- Maintained by NYSDOT
- Length: 3.88 mi (6.24 km)
- Existed: c. 1936–July 1, 1974

Major junctions
- West end: NY 79 in Ithaca
- East end: NY 366 in Dryden

Location
- Country: United States
- State: New York
- Counties: Tompkins

Highway system
- New York Highways; Interstate; US; State; Reference; Parkways
| ← NY 391 | → NY 392 |

New York State Route 392 (NY 392) was a state highway in the vicinity of the city of Ithaca in central Tompkins County, New York, in the United States. The western terminus of the route was at an intersection with NY 79 in downtown Ithaca. Its eastern terminus was at a junction with NY 366 in the hamlet of Varna, located within the town of Dryden. NY 392 served as a connector between Ithaca, Varna, and the campus of Cornell University.

The routing of NY 392 was originally part of NY 13 in the 1920s. NY 13 was realigned in the mid-1930s to bypass Cornell University from the south, at which time the portion of its former alignment from Stewart Avenue to Varna was redesignated as NY 392. The route was extended southwest into downtown Ithaca over the remainder of NY 13's former routing in the mid-1960s before it was removed on July 1, 1974. All of former NY 392 is now locally maintained.

== Route description ==
NY 392 began at an intersection with westbound NY 79 (West Seneca Street) in downtown Ithaca. It headed north on Cayuga Street for two blocks, then cut eastward on Court Street for four blocks to its end at Linn Street. NY 392 turned back to the north, following Linn Street for one block before veering northeast onto University Avenue. At Lake Street, University Avenue turned east; however, NY 392 continued northeast on Willard Way to Stewart Avenue. The route turned south on Stewart Avenue for one block to its junction with University Avenue. Here, NY 392 rejoined University Avenue and headed eastward onto the campus of Cornell University.

Within the Cornell University grounds, NY 392 paralleled Fall Creek as it headed eastward. It became Forest Home Drive upon intersecting East Avenue. The route continued along the southern bank of the creek for roughly 0.75 miles (1.21 km) before crossing the waterway and entering the hamlet of Forest Home. Its stay in the community was brief as it turned to the southeast and crossed back over Fall Creek shortly afterward. NY 392 continued eastward on Forest Home Road along the southern edge of the creek to the hamlet of Varna (within the town of Dryden), where it ended at a junction with NY 366.

== History ==
In 1924, NY 13 was assigned to an alignment extending from the city of Elmira in the south to the village of Cazenovia in the north by way of the city of Ithaca. The route initially entered the city of Ithaca on Spencer Street. NY 13 continued through downtown Ithaca on Cayuga, Court, and Linn Streets to University Avenue. From there, the route went through the campus of Cornell University on University Avenue (via Willard Way) and Forest Home Drive. NY 13 followed Forest Home Drive into the town of Dryden and to the hamlet of Varna, where it turned northeastward onto Dryden Road.

NY 13 was realigned c. 1936 to bypass the Cornell University campus to the south. The former alignment of NY 13 from downtown Ithaca to the junction of Willard Way and Stewart Avenue became part of NY 34A while the remainder was redesignated as NY 392. NY 34A was realigned in the early 1940s to follow Stewart Avenue south of NY 392, resulting in the truncation of NY 392 to the intersection of University and Stewart Avenues. In the mid-1960s, NY 34A was removed and NY 392 was extended southwestward to NY 79 in downtown Ithaca over what had been the routing of NY 13 during the 1920s and 1930s.

The NY 392 designation was removed entirely on July 1, 1974. All of NY 392 is now locally maintained by the city of Ithaca, the town of Ithaca, and the town of Dryden.

== Major intersections ==
The entire route was in Tompkins County.

| Location | mi | km | Destinations | Notes |
|---|---|---|---|---|
| City of Ithaca | 0.00 | 0.00 | NY 79 west (West Seneca Street) | Western terminus |
| City of Ithaca | 1.00 | 1.61 | Stewart Avenue north | Formerly NY 34A |
| City of Ithaca | 1.09 | 1.75 | Stewart Avenue south | Formerly NY 34A |
| Town of Dryden | 3.88 | 6.24 | NY 366 | Eastern terminus; Hamlet of Varna |
1.000 mi = 1.609 km; 1.000 km = 0.621 mi
