= Edith Ellis (disambiguation) =

Edith Ellis (1861–1916) was an English writer and women's rights activist.

Edith Ellis may also refer to:

- Edith Ellis (playwright) (1866–1960), American actress and dramatist
- Edith Anna Ellis (1868–1940), American women's rights activist, writer and politician
- Edith Maud Ellis (1878–1963), English antiwar activist during World War I
