= Virgil (CDP), New York =

Virgil, New York
- Census-designated place
- Location within New York Location within the United States
- Coordinates: 42°30′38″N 76°11′40″W
- Country: United States
- State: New York
- County: Cortland
- Town: Virgil

Area
  - Total: 0.90 sq mi (2.32 km^{2})
  - Land: 0.90 sq mi (2.32 km^{2})
  - Water: 0 sq mi (0.00 km^{2})
- Elevation: 1,410 ft (430 m)

Population (2020)
  - Total: 298
  - Density: 333.4/sq mi (128.72/km^{2})
- Time zone: UTC-5 (Eastern (EST))
  - Summer (DST): UTC-4 (EDT)
- ZIP Code: 13045 (Cortland)
- FIPS code: 36-77585

Virgil is a hamlet and census-designated place (CDP) in the town of Virgil, Cortland County, New York, United States. The population was 298 at the 2020 census.

== Geography ==
The hamlet of Virgil is located in the west-central part of the town of Virgil, in the valley of Virgil Creek, a west-flowing stream which is part of the Cayuga Lake watershed. New York State Routes 392 and 215 intersect at the center of the hamlet. Route 392 leads east 7 miles (11 km) to U.S. Route 11 in Messengerville, and west 6 miles (10 km) to NY Route 13 in the village of Dryden, while Route 215 leads north 6 miles (10 km) to Cortland, the county seat.

According to the United States Census Bureau, the Virgil CDP has a total area of 0.89 square miles (2.3 km^{2}), all land.

== Demographics ==
Historical population
Census	Pop.	Note	%±
2020	298		—
U.S. Decennial Census
