= Groton High School (Groton, New York) =

Groton Junior/Senior High School

Location
- 400 Peru Road; Groton, New York 13073; United States
- Coordinates: 42°34′50″N 76°22′13″W

Information
- Other names: Groton Jr-Sr High School; Groton Central School; Groton High School; GHS
- Type: Public high school
- School district: Groton Central School District
- CEEB code: 332205
- NCES School ID: 361302001068
- Principal: Brian Kavanagh
- Teaching staff: 38.50 (on an FTE basis)
- Grades: 6–12
- Enrollment: 389 (2023–2024)
- Student to teacher ratio: 10.10
- Campus type: Rural distant
- Color(s): Red and White
- Mascot: Red Hawks
- Website: www.grotoncs.org/o/highschool

Groton High School, officially Groton Junior/Senior High School, is the only high school in the Groton Central School District. It serves the Village and Town of Groton, Tompkins County, New York, and extending into areas of Cortland and Cayuga Counties. Its previous building is now listed on the National Register of Historic Places.

== Notable alumni ==
- Ann Cody, three-time U.S. Paralympian and disability rights advocate
- Julian B. Erway, lawyer and politician who served in the New York State Senate
