= New York State Route 393 =

Former highway in New York

New York State Route 393
- Map of the Ithaca area with NY 393 highlighted in red

Route information
- Maintained by State of New York Department of Public Works
- Length: 1.9 mi (3.1 km)
- Existed: c. 1933–mid-1960s

Major junctions
- West end: NY 13 in Ithaca
- East end: Game Farm Road on Ithaca–Dryden town line

Location
- Country: United States
- State: New York
- Counties: Tompkins

Highway system
- New York Highways; Interstate; US; State; Reference; Parkways
← NY 392	→ NY 394

New York State Route 393 (NY 393) was an east–west state highway in Tompkins County, New York, in the United States. It was a spur route that connected the downtown district of the city of Ithaca to the Ithaca–Dryden town line. The western terminus of the route was at an intersection with NY 13 (modern NY 366) in East Ithaca. Its eastern terminus was at Game Farm Road, a local road that straddled the boundary between the towns of Ithaca and Dryden.

NY 393 was assigned in the early 1930s as a signed designation for a highway that the state of New York had assumed maintenance of in the 1910s. It originally extended west along Mitchell Street to NY 79, but was truncated to Ithaca Road when NY 13 was rerouted through Ithaca in the mid-1930s. The NY 393 designation was removed in the mid-1960s, and its former routing is now maintained by the city of Ithaca and Tompkins County. The designation is currently reserved by the New York State Department of Transportation for a highway in Chautauqua County.

== Route description ==
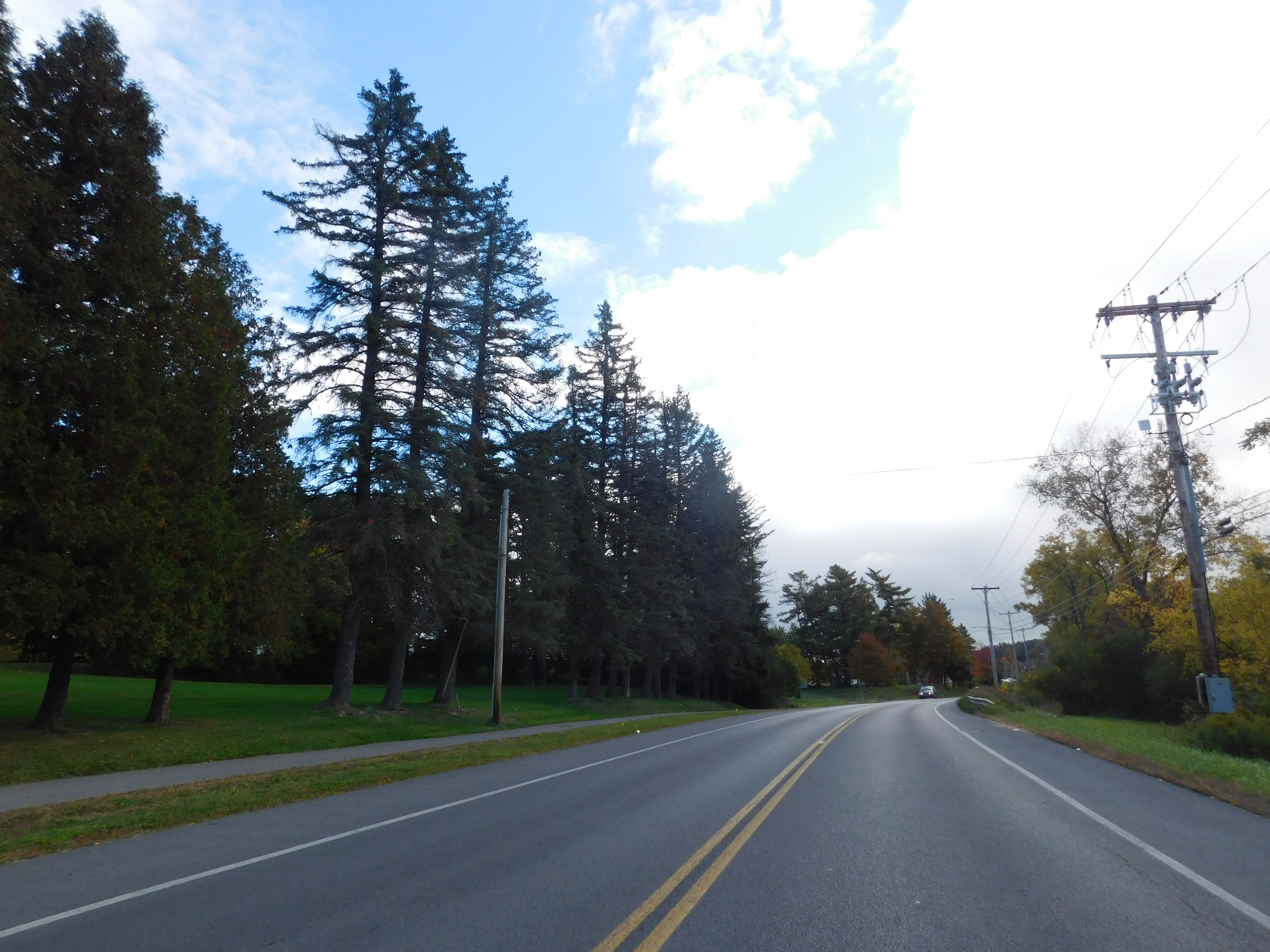
Mitchell Street, the former alignment of NY 393, in Ithaca

NY 393 began at the intersection of Mitchell Street and Ithaca Road in the city of Ithaca. Here, NY 13 turned off Mitchell Street to follow Ithaca Road while NY 393 continued eastward on Mitchell Street. It passed through the community of East Ithaca and entered the surrounding town of Ithaca. In the town of Ithaca, NY 393 intersected Pine Tree Road (County Route 174 or CR 174) and passed through areas with varying levels of development before ending at Game Farm Road, here marking the boundary between the towns of Ithaca and Dryden. The roadway continued eastward into Dryden as a locally maintained highway.

== History ==
The portion of Mitchell Street and Ellis Hollow Road from the city of Ithaca to the Ithaca–Dryden town line had existed as early as 1900. In the early 1910s, the state of New York helped finance improvements to the portion of the highway within the town of Ithaca. The highway was added to the state highway system in late October 1914. In 1916, construction began on an upgrade of Mitchell Street in Ithaca, again partially paid for by the state of New York. All of Mitchell Street was accepted into the state highway system on August 31, 1917.

The state-maintained portion of Mitchell Street and Ellis Hollow Road was designated as NY 393 c. 1933. The route began at NY 79 (State Street) in Ithaca and ended at the Dryden town line, where the road continued east as a local highway. NY 13 was realigned through Ithaca c. 1936 to bypass the campus of Cornell University to the south along Dryden Road, Ithaca Road, and Mitchell Street. As a result, NY 393 was truncated slightly to begin at the junction of Ithaca Road and Mitchell Street. NY 393 remained unchanged until the mid-1960s when it was removed from the state highway system. The portion of NY 393's former routing in the city of Ithaca is now city-maintained while the remainder of the highway in the town of Ithaca is now part of CR 110.

The NY 393 designation is currently reserved by the New York State Department of Transportation for a proposed "Chautauqua Lakeway" in Chautauqua County between Interstate 86/NY 17 and NY 5. No timetable exists for the Lakeway's construction nor for NY 393's reassignment.

== Major intersections ==
The entire route was in Tompkins County.

Location	mi	km	Destinations	Notes
City of Ithaca	0.00	0.00	NY 13	Now NY 366
Ithaca–Dryden town line	1.92	3.09	Game Farm Road	
1.000 mi = 1.609 km; 1.000 km = 0.621 mi
