= Edith Anna Ellis =

American women's rights activist

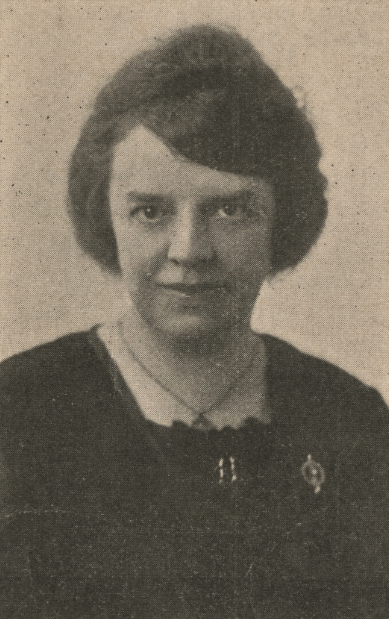
- Born: March 1, 1868; Varna, New York, U.S.
- Died: July 31, 1940 (aged 72); Binghamton, New York, U.S.

Edith Anna Ellis (March 1, 1868 – July 31, 1940) was an American women's rights activist, writer, politician, and farmer from Tompkins County, New York. She ran for elected office with the slogan "Insist that no man shall occupy a position that a woman can fill", a quote from a War Industries Board mandate, and other wartime slogans contextualized to support women in politics.

== Life ==
Edith Anna Ellis was born on March 1, 1868, in Varna, New York, near the "Ellis Hollow" area of Dryden that is named for her family. She earned a Bachelor of Letters degree from Cornell University in 1890, then worked in the Cornell University Library.

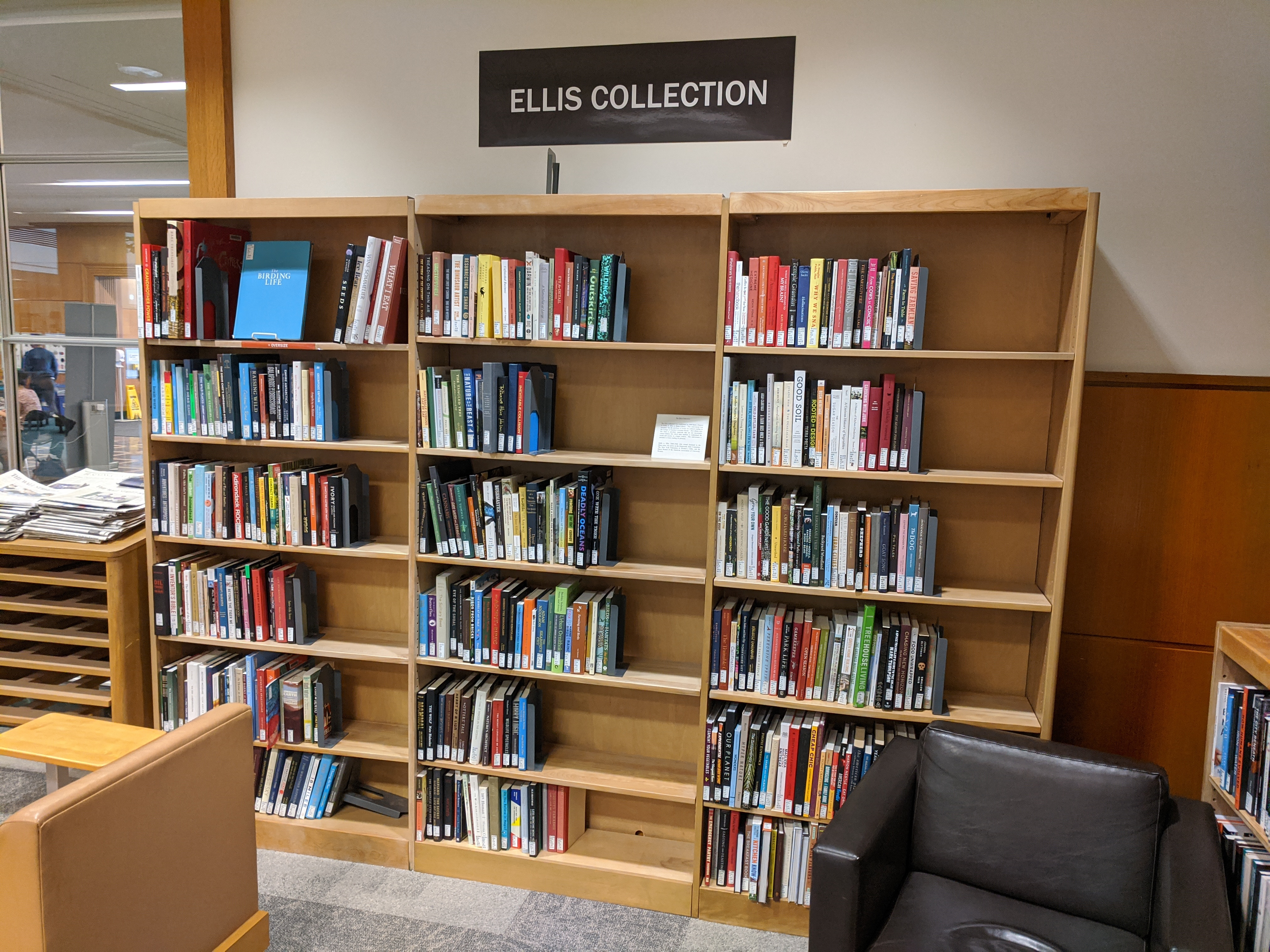
Ellis Collection of books at Mann Library, Cornell University

She became the first woman to run for office in Tompkins County when she ran for county clerk in 1918, shortly after women were enfranchised in New York State. She argued that government should be turned over to women because men were needed to fight World War I, saying it was "necessary to release the available manpower" of politicians into the war effort, and to "substitute woman power" into government.

She lost the 1918 election, but became a delegate to the 1918 Democratic State Convention in Saratoga Springs, New York. She was active in the Democratic party for the rest of her life, serving on the New York State Democratic Committee.

Ellis was active in New York state women's clubs and supported women's suffrage. She wrote for newspapers and magazines.

Ellis endowed "a fund for reading matter of general cultural interest" at the New York State College of Agriculture. Today her endowment funds the Ellis Collection of books, intended to encourage reading about farming and the life sciences for fun and personal development, rather than for coursework. The collection sits near the entryway of Mann Library on the Cornell University campus.

Ellis died on July 31, 1940, and was buried at Lake View Cemetery in Ithaca. At the time of her death, she was the only woman ever appointed as a party chair in her Assembly district.

== Personal life ==
Edith A. Ellis married Willard Waldo Ellis in 1903.
