= New York State Route 215 =

State highway in Cortland County, New York, US

New York State Route 215
- Map of Cortland County in central New York with NY 215 highlighted in red

Route information
- Maintained by NYSDOT and the city of Cortland
- Length: 6.11 mi (9.83 km)
- Existed: early 1980s–present

Major junctions
- South end: NY 392 in Virgil
- North end: NY 13 in Cortland

Location
- Country: United States
- State: New York
- Counties: Cortland

Highway system
- New York Highways; Interstate; US; State; Reference; Parkways
← NY 215	→ NY 216

New York State Route 215 (NY 215) is a north–south state highway located entirely within Cortland County, New York, in the United States. It extends for just over 6 miles (10 km) from an intersection with NY 392 in the town of Virgil to a junction with NY 13 in the city of Cortland. NY 215 is largely a rural connector highway, except for the final 0.5-mile (0.8 km) in the city of Cortland. The entirety of NY 215 was originally part of NY 90. In the early 1980s, NY 90 was truncated north to its junction with U.S. Route 11 (US 11) and NY 41 in the village of Homer. Its former routing south of the city was redesignated as NY 215 and NY 392.

== Route description ==
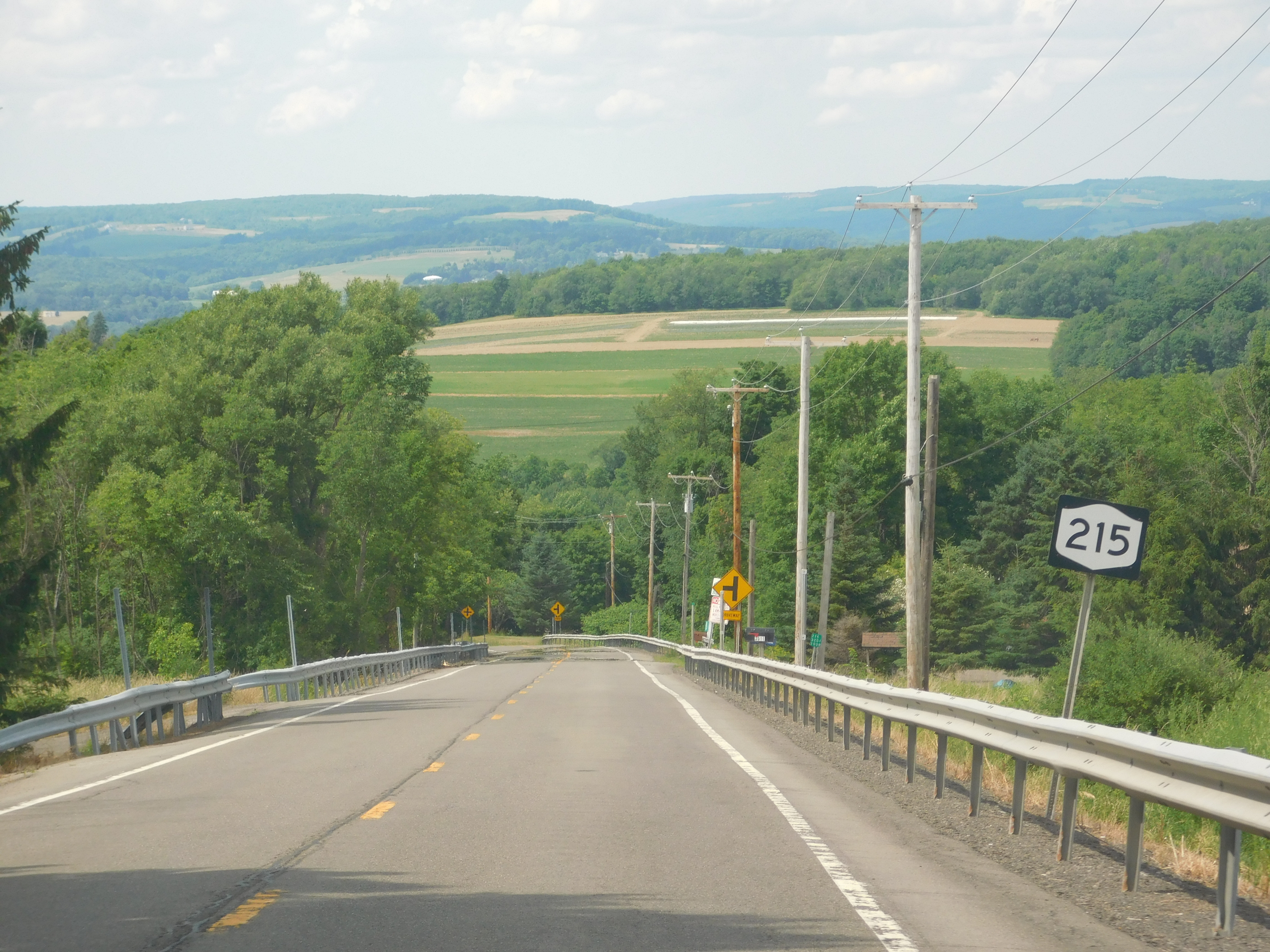
NY 215 through Cortlandville and the valley toward Cortland

NY 215 begins at an intersection with NY 392 in the hamlet of Virgil within the town of the same name. NY 392 enters the junction from the south and exits to the east, while NY 215 heads northward, running alongside Virgil Creek as it winds its way through the rural, hilly town. Virgil Creek ends south of the Virgil–Cortlandville town line; however, NY 215 continues on, initially rising in elevation before heading downhill as it crosses into Cortlandville. It continues downhill toward Cortland, providing views of the city and the surrounding Tioughnioga River valley, which holds Cortland and the nearby village of Homer.

It finally levels off upon reaching the base of the valley, where the road passes through a stretch of significant development just outside the Cortland city limits, its first in the town heading northbound. The amount of development increases substantially over the next several blocks in the city, where it becomes Owego Street. NY 215 continues north to Tompkins Street, where the street and route both end at NY 13. The junction is just 0.25 miles (0.40 km) southwest of downtown Cortland, and another quarter-mile southeast of the campus of SUNY Cortland. NY 215 is maintained by the New York State Department of Transportation (NYSDOT) from NY 392 to the Cortland city line, where it becomes city-maintained for the remainder of its routing.

== History ==
The north–south highway linking Virgil to Cortland was originally designated as part of NY 90, a new highway extending from Messengerville in the south to Montezuma in the north via Virgil and Cortland, in the 1930 renumbering of state highways in New York. On April 1, 1981, ownership and maintenance of a highway linking NY 90 in Virgil to the Tompkins–Cortland county line was transferred from Cortland County to the state of New York. Following the transfer, NY 90 was truncated on its southern end to its junction with US 11 in the village of Homer north of Cortland. The former routing of NY 90 from Virgil to Cortland was redesignated as NY 215 while the Virgil–Messengerville section became part of NY 392, which also extended westward into Tompkins County over the new state-maintained highway.

== Major intersections ==
The entire route is in Cortland County.

Location	mi	km	Destinations	Notes
Virgil	0.00	0.00	NY 392 – Dryden	Southern terminus; hamlet of Virgil
Cortland	6.11	9.83	NY 13 (Tompkins Street)	Northern terminus
1.000 mi = 1.609 km; 1.000 km = 0.621 mi
