= Etna, New York =

Unincorporated community in Tompkins County, New York, United States

Coordinates: 42°29′06″N 76°23′01″W

Etna (formerly Miller's Settlement and Columbia prior to 1820) is an unincorporated community in Tompkins County, New York, United States. It lies at an elevation of 1020 feet (311 m). It lays on the western end of the town of Dryden.

The hamlet got its name around 1820, when the first post office opened, because people thought the eruptions from smokestacks in the area looked like Mount Etna.

The 1894 book Landmarks of Tompkins County, New York by John H. Selkreg describes "Etna Village" as follows:

This small village is situated on Fall Creek, al little west of the center of the town, and is a station on the E., C. & N. Railroad. It was known in early years as "Miller's Settlement" from William MILLER, who settled here about the beginning of the century. Later it was called "Columbia," and retained that name until the post office was established. A grist mill and saw mill have been in operation here many years, and now carried on by George H. HOUTZ. There are two hotels in the village, one of which is under proprietorship of John E. COY, and the other of Hiram A. ROOT. A store is kept by COGGSWELL Brothers. There are the usual complement of shops, and a church noticed elsewhere.
