= Dryden High School (New York) =

Location
- 118 Freeville Rd; Dryden, (Tompkins County), New York 13053; United States; 42°30′00″N 76°18′36″W

Information
- School type: Public school (government funded), high school
- Founded: 1936
- School district: Dryden Central School District
- NCES District ID: 3609330
- Superintendent: Joshua Bacigalupi
- CEEB code: 331655
- NCES School ID: 360933000713
- Principal: Kyle Colunio
- Teaching staff: 39.56 (FTE)
- Grades: 9–12
- Enrollment: 345 (2023-2024)
- Student to teacher ratio: 8.72
- Classes offered: High School and College Level
- Schedule type: 9 periods
- Hours in school day: 6.5
- Campuses: 1
- Campus: Rural: Fringe
- Campus size: Small
- Area: Suburban
- Colors: Purple and White
- Athletics conference: IAC, Section 4
- Sports: Cross Country, Boys and Girls Swim, Boys and Girls Soccer Volleyball, Football, Cheerleading, Boys and Girls Basketball, Wrestling, Bowling, Baseball, Softball, Indoor & Outdoor Track, Golf
- Mascot: Lions
- Rival: Lansing
- Website: https://www.dryden.k12.ny.us/home

Dryden High School is a public high school located in Dryden, Tompkins County, New York, United States, and is the only high school operated by the Dryden Central School District. This district is in New York State's southern tier and encompasses an area of 110 square miles (280 km^{2}) and serves a population of about 1900 students. The school's mascot is a Purple Lion.

The school district's attendance boundary includes the Village of Dryden, the Village of Freeville, and the McLean census-designated place.

== Administration ==
Joshua Bacigalupi is the Superintendent of the Dryden Central School District. Sarah Powell is the principal of Dryden High School, with Dale Sweet as the assistant principal.

== Academics ==
Dryden offers a comprehensive program with multi-level instruction in all academic areas. The school is accredited by the New York State Board of Regents. Few Advanced Placement courses are offered each year and are contingent on school funding and teacher availability. In the past, U.S. History, European History, Studio Art, Microeconomics, and Music Theory have been offered. Some dual-credit courses are also offered through the Tompkins Cortland Community College, located nearby, which transfer to schools within the SUNY system, but often not to other private schools such as Cornell University. Dryden High School also has programs set up with TST Boces where juniors and seniors can pursue vocational studies, including welding, culinary arts, and cosmetology, among others. TST Boces also has a program through Cornell University called New Visions where seniors can attend classes in life sciences, health and medical sciences, and engineering. Dryden High School has a graduation rate of 78% As of August 2020.

== Sports ==
Dryden High School offers many varsity sports. Most teams compete in the Interscholastic Athletic Conference (I.A.C.).

Dryden High School Varsity Coaches
Sport	Coach	Citation
Football	Justin Wood	
Girls' Soccer	Neal McDowell	
Boys' Soccer	Laszlo Engel	
Cheerleading	Deanna Day	
Cross Country		
Girls' Swimming	Jon Singer	
Volleyball	Margaret Hartquist	
Boys' Basketball	Zach LeViere	
Girls' Basketball	Laszlo Engel	
Wrestling	Rex Hollenbeck	
Boys' Swimming		
Bowling	Dave Hicks	
Baseball	Andrew Lampman	
Softball	Dave Allen	
Golf	Dave Hicks	
Girls' Lacrosse	Brittany Barillaro	
Boys' Lacrosse	Dominic Barillaro	
Indoor/Outdoor Track & Field	Lee Stuttle	

Note: Lee Stuttle recently retired from his position as Track & Field coach after 30 years of coaching. The boys' swimming coach and the cross country coach were not listed on the high school team pages.

The boys' varsity soccer team won the 2006 I.A.C. championship with an undefeated season. In 2016, The Boys' Track and Field Team were undefeated division champions, I.A.C. Champions, and Section IV Champions.

== Theater ==
Dryden High School has a robust theater department. In 2018, the high school put on a production of Legally Blonde, and were recognized by the Cortland Repertory Theater Pavilion Awards. The production won Best Musical and Best Visual Ensemble, along with many individual awards. In 2019, Dryden put on a production of the Addams Family, where they were recognized for Best Vocal Ensemble in a Musical, along with 3 individual awards at the Pavilion Awards.

== Arts ==
The arts department at Dryden High School has a variety of programs, with Media Arts, Studio Art, and Crafts the foundational courses to move up toward upper-level courses. Dryden High School is often recognized in the regional Scholastic Art Awards. In 2019, 15 students were recognized in the ceremony. In 2020, 21 students were honored, and in 2021, 10 students were honored.

== Music Program ==
As of April 2025, Dryden's High School provides three music programs. Chorus, Concert Band, and Music Theory, along with smaller band ensembles, such as Jazz Band, Pep Band, Group Ensembles such as The Clarinet Choir, Woodwind Choir, and Percussion Ensemble.

== Student Population ==
Dryden High School serves a population of 453 of the district's 1900 students. Most Dryden High School students go on to some form of college, many progressing to Tompkins-Cortland Community College which is about one mile (1.6 km) away from the school campus. The Dryden Central School district is predominately white, with the population of the school district being 86% white, 6% multiracial, 4% Hispanic or Latino, 2% Black or African American, and 1% Asian or Pacific Islander, as of 2019.

== Building ==
The Dryden High School building is connected to the Dryden Middle School. The combined buildings house many classrooms as well as two gymnasiums, a pool, two cafeterias, multiple computer laboratories, an auditorium and the school library.

=== Capital Projects ===
In 2017, a $38 million capital project was proposed and approved by voters. Construction began on the athletic fields and on the roof at the MS/HS and elementary schools. A new transportation facility was also approved. In addition to the improvement of the athletic fields and the transportation facility, plans were also approved to improve the auditorium and create music and choral classrooms, along with the improvement of the high school gymnasium and locker rooms, and the cafeterias. In 2019, the town of Dryden approved a $3 million capital project. Two propositions passed: the first approved the installation of a synthetic turf field on Dryden's Volante Field, along with better drainage systems and sound systems, and the second approved the district's acquisition of property at 22 Pleasant Street.

== Technology ==
The Dryden Central School District and Dryden High School utilize a computer network software made by Citrix which centrally houses programs. Computers in the school network access programs via this network's central server, and as such, computers do not generally have programs loaded onto them. In addition, the school uses the Websense program which filters out potentially offensive/disruptive websites on the internet.
