= Dryden District School No. 5 =

- U.S. National Register of Historic Places
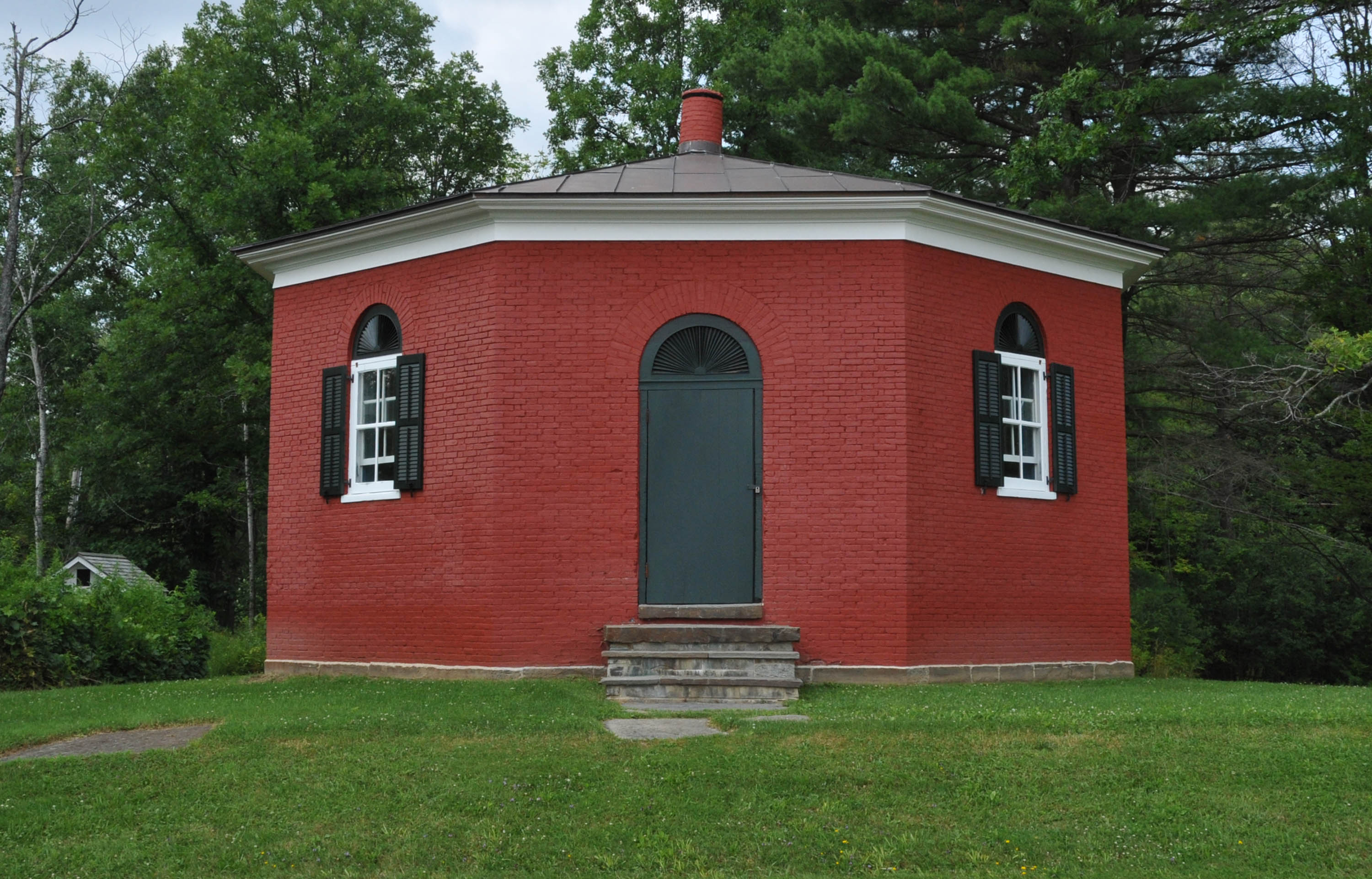

- Location within New York Location within the United States
- Location: 1756 Hanshaw Rd., Dryden, New York
- Coordinates: 42°28′26″N 76°25′53″W
- Area: less than one acre
- Built: 1827
- Architectural style: Octagon Style
- NRHP reference No.: 94001282
- Added to NRHP: November 04, 1994

Dryden District School No. 5, also known as Eight Square Schoolhouse, is a historic octagonal school building located in Dryden in Tompkins County, New York. It was built in 1827 and is a simple one-room, one-story, brick octagon style building constructed with a low pitch hipped roof banded by a plain narrow frieze. A circular brick chimney rises from the center of the standing seam metal roof. Also on the property are two free standing, wood frame, gable roofed outhouses.

It was used as a school until 1941 and is now a facility of The History Center in Tompkins County (formerly known as the Dewitt Historical Society), who use it to host living history programs for fourth graders.

It is the oldest surviving school building in Tompkins County and the only brick octagonal schoolhouse still standing in New York State. It was listed on the National Register of Historic Places in 1994.

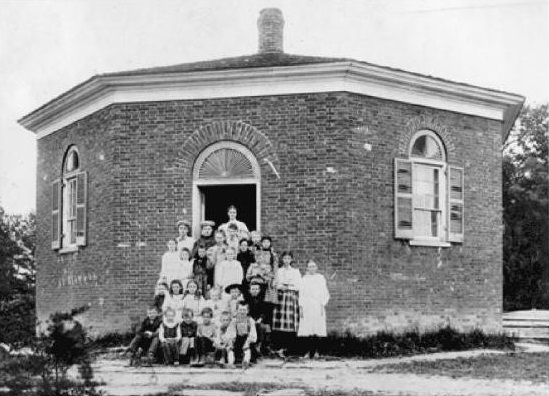
Students and teachers in front of the octagonal Eight Square Schoolhouse in Dryden, New York, in 1890.
