= Groton, New York =

- Town
- Location within the state of New York Groton, New York (the United States)
- Coordinates: 42°35′22.7″N 76°22′1.9″W
- Country: United States
- State: New York
- County: Tompkins County
- Incorporated: 1817

Area
  - Total: 49.54 sq mi (128.31 km^{2})
  - Land: 49.41 sq mi (127.96 km^{2})
  - Water: 0.14 sq mi (0.35 km^{2}) 0.10%
- Elevation: 1,690 ft (515 m)

Population (2020)
  - Total: 5,746
  - Density: 116.0/sq mi (44.78/km^{2})
- Time zone: UTC-5 (Eastern (EST))
  - Summer (DST): UTC-4 (EDT)
- ZIP Code: 13073
- Area codes: 315, 607
- FIPS code: 36-30972
- GNIS feature ID: 951849
- Website: townofgrotonny.org

Groton is a town in Tompkins County, New York, United States. The population was 5,950 at the 2010 census. The name is taken from Groton, Massachusetts.

The Town of Groton contains a village, also called Groton. The town is in the northeast corner of the county and is northeast of Ithaca.

As well as a village, the Town of Groton also includes a former school, Groton High School, which was listed on the National Register of Historic Places in 1994.

== History ==
Groton was in the former Central New York Military Tract.

The town was formed in 1817, before the formation of Tompkins County, from the Town of Locke (in Cayuga County) as the "Town of Division." Many of the early residents from New England elected to change the name to "Groton."

In 1888, the community of Groton separated from the town by incorporating as a village. Groton was also home to the original Corona Typewriter Company which later merged to form Smith Corona.

== Geography ==
According to the United States Census Bureau, the town has a total area of 128.4 km^{2} (49.6 sq mi). 128.3 km^{2} (49.5 sq mi) of it is farmland and 0.1 km^{2} (0.04 sq mi) of it (0.10%) is water.

The north town line is the border of Cayuga County, and the east side town line is the border of Cortland County. The southern border is with the Town of Dryden and the western border with the Town of Lansing.

Groton is in the Finger Lakes region of central New York State.

North-south New York State Route 38 intersects New York State Route 222 at Groton village. New York State Route 34B is an east–west highway by the south town line.

== Demographics ==
Historical population
Census	Pop.	Note	%±
1820	2,742		—
1830	3,597		31.2%
1840	3,618		0.6%
1850	3,342		−7.6%
1860	3,534		5.7%
1870	3,512		−0.6%
1880	3,450		−1.8%
1890	3,572		3.5%
1900	3,564		−0.2%
1910	3,280		−8.0%
1920	4,122		25.7%
1930	3,789		−8.1%
1940	3,879		2.4%
1950	4,246		9.5%
1960	4,469		5.3%
1970	4,881		9.2%
1980	5,213		6.8%
1990	5,483		5.2%
2000	5,794		5.7%
2010	5,950		2.7%
2020	5,746		−3.4%
U.S. Decennial Census

As of the census of 2000, there were 5,794 people, 2,168 households, and 1,543 families residing in the town. The population density was 116.9 inhabitants per square mile (45.1/km^{2}). There were 2,287 housing units at an average density of 46.2 units per square mile (17.8 units/km^{2}). The racial makeup of the town was 97.38% White, 0.64% Black or African American, 0.09% Native American, 0.24% Asian, 0.26% from other races, and 1.40% from two or more races. Hispanic or Latino of any race were 0.79% of the population.

There were 2,168 households, out of which 35.8% had children under the age of 18 living with them, 55.9% were married couples living together, 10.6% had a female householder with no husband present, and 28.8% were non-families. 23.1% of all households were made up of individuals, and 9.7% had someone living alone who was 65 years of age or older. The average household size was 2.62 and the average family size was 3.09.

In the town, the population was spread out, with 28.1% under the age of 18, 6.4% from 18 to 24, 28.7% from 25 to 44, 23.9% from 45 to 64, and 12.8% who were 65 years of age or older. The median age was 37 years. For every 100 females, there were 95.9 males. For every 100 females age 18 and over, there were 91.1 males.

The median income for a household in the town was $42,407, and the median income for a family was $50,057. Males had a median income of $31,890 versus $23,642 for females. The per capita income for the town was $18,075. About 4.8% of families and 6.0% of the population were below the poverty line, including 7.3% of those under age 18 and 4.8% of those age 65 or over.

== 2020 Census ==
As of the census of 2020, there were 5,746 people, 2,372 households, and an unknown number of families residing in the town. The population density was 115.98 people per square mile (44.78 people/km^{2}). There were 2,561 housing units at an average density of 51.69 per square mile (19.96/km^{2}). The racial makeup of the town was 88.06% White, 1.02% Black or African American, 0.29% Native American, 0.71% Asian, 1.53% from other races, and 8.37% from two or more races. Hispanic or Latino of any race were 3.72% of the population. An estimated 18.0% were of German ancestry, 13.3% English, 12.3% Irish, and 7.8% Italian.

There were 2,372 households, out of which 36.6% had children under the age of 18 living with them, 56.5% were married couples living together, 18.8% had a female householder with no spouse/partner present, and 15.9% had a male householder with no spouse/ partner present. The average household size was 2.41 and the average family size was 2.86.

In the town, the population was spread out, with 22.7% under the age of 18, 6.4% from 18 to 24, 34.8% from 15 to 44, and 14.2% who were 65 years of age or older. The median age was 39.7 years.

The median income for a household in the town was $59,625, and the median income for a family was $77,738. The per capita income for the town was $29,571. About 5.5% of the population is below the poverty line, including 4.3% of those under age 18 and 6.8% of those age 65 or over.

== Communities and locations in the Town of Groton ==
- Benson Corners – A location in the southwest part of the town.
- Carey Corners – A location northeast of Fitts Corners.
- Fitts Corners – A hamlet near the south town line.
- Groton – The Village of Groton at NY-38 and NY-222.
- Groton City – a partial ghost town in the northeast part of Groton on County Road 103. It has about 10-20 residents and was formerly known as "Slab City."
- Grotto – A hamlet in the southeast part of the town.
- Harts Corners – A location on the south town line, south of Fitts Corners.
- Lafayette Corners – A hamlet east of Groton village on NY-222.
- Ludlow Corners – A location in the southwest part of Groton.
- McLean – A hamlet in the southeast part of the town.
- Morton Corners – A hamlet northeast of Groton village.
- Mosher Corners – A hamlet west of Groton village on NY-222.
- Mud Schoolhouse Corners – A location in the southeast part of Groton on County Road 180.
- Nubia – A hamlet south of Lafayette Corners.
- Peruton – A hamlet at the south town line.
- Peruville – A hamlet near the south town line. Mayor Jacob K Becker currently residing.
- Pierson Corners – A location east of West Groton.
- Pleasant Valley – A hamlet in the southwest part of Groton.
- Stevens Corners – A location north of McLean.
- West Groton – A hamlet in the northwest corner of Groton.

== Notable people ==
- David Bradley, businessman and a pioneer plowman
- Terrence C. Graves, officer in the United States Marine Corps who was awarded the Medal of Honor
- Sylvester Pennoyer, educator, attorney, and politician; served as Mayor of Portland, Oregon from 1896-1898 and Governor of Oregon from 1886 to 1895; famous in U.S. legal circles for involvement in Pennoyer v. Neff 95 U.S. 714 (1878), a landmark Supreme Court case relating to civil procedure
