= New York State Route 392 =

Highway in New York

New York State Route 392
- Map of Cortland and Tompkins counties with NY 392 highlighted in red

Route information
- Maintained by NYSDOT
- Length: 13.12 mi (21.11 km)
- Existed: early 1980s–present

Major junctions
- West end: NY 13 / NY 38 in Dryden
- East end: US 11 in Virgil

Location
- Country: United States
- State: New York
- Counties: Tompkins, Cortland

Highway system
- New York Highways; Interstate; US; State; Reference; Parkways
← NY 392	→ NY 393

New York State Route 392 (NY 392) is an east–west state highway in the Southern Tier region of New York in the United States. The western terminus of the route is at an intersection with the concurrency of NY 13 and NY 38 in the village of Dryden in Tompkins County. Its eastern terminus is at a junction with U.S. Route 11 (US 11) in the hamlet of Messengerville within the Cortland County town of Virgil. NY 392 passes through the hamlet of Virgil, where it intersects NY 215.

The portion of NY 392 east of NY 215 was originally designated as part of NY 90 in the 1930 renumbering of state highways in New York. In the early 1980s, the state of New York assumed maintenance over an east–west county-maintained highway linking NY 13 and NY 38 in the village of Dryden to NY 90 in the hamlet of Virgil. NY 90 was truncated to Homer following the acquisition of the roadway, and the new roadway was combined with NY 90's former routing from Virgil to Messengerville to create NY 392.

== Route description ==
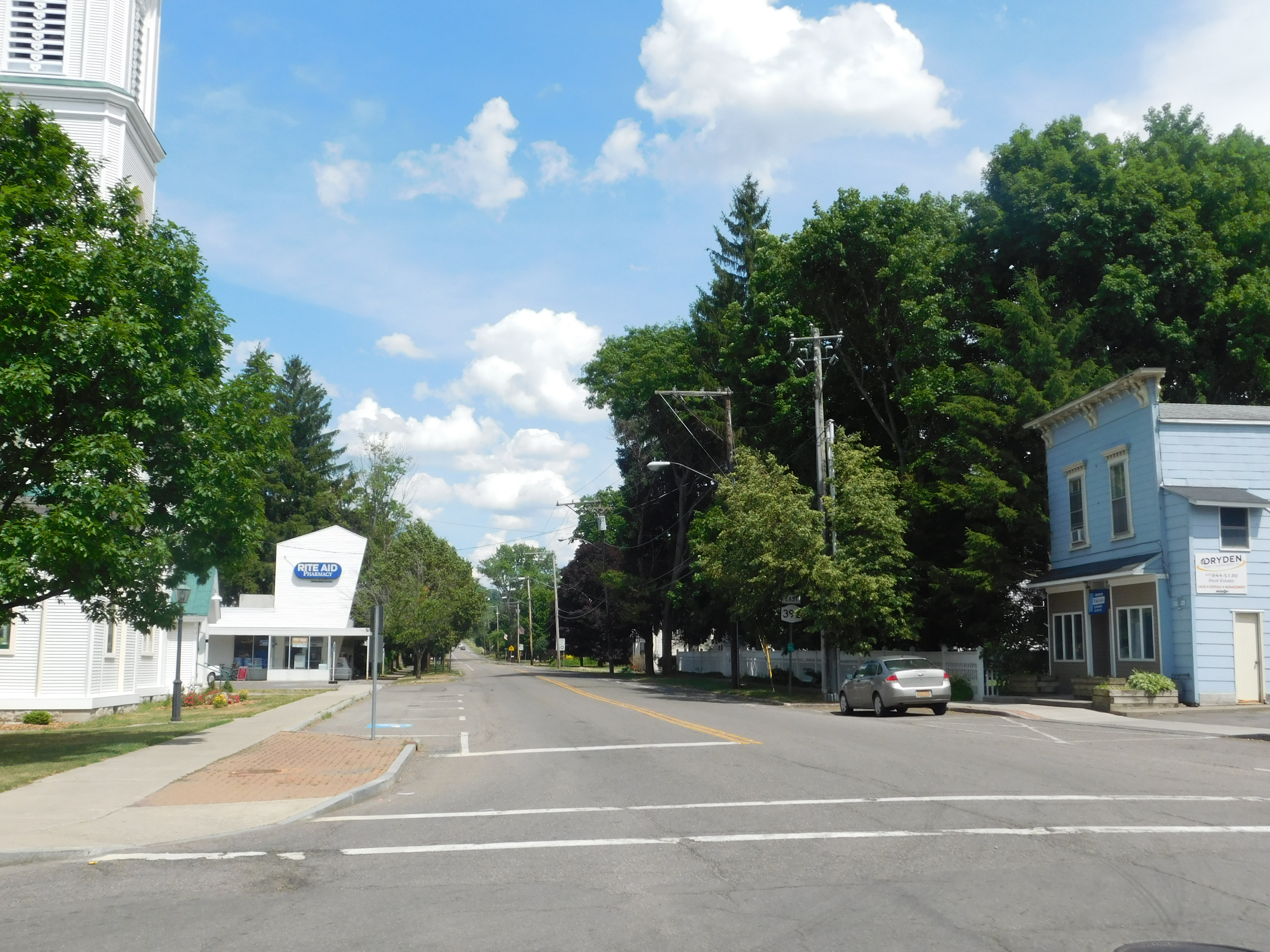
NY 392 eastbound in Dryden

NY 392 begins at an intersection with NY 13 and NY 38 in the village of Dryden. The road quickly leaves Dryden, heading eastward through Tompkins County. NY 392, known as Virgil Road, turns to the southeast quickly before turning to the northeast. The area NY 392 passes through is mostly rural, consisting largely of cultivated farmlands. After 2 miles (3.2 km), NY 392 passes into Cortland County.

Now in the town of Virgil, NY 392 intersects with County Route 127A (CR 127A, named West Meeting House Road), a spur route of NY 392's predecessor, CR 127. It continues northeast, intersecting CR 128 (Owego Hill Road) before entering the hamlet of Virgil. Here, it turns eastward at an intersection with NY 215 and CR 125 (West State Road). Past Virgil, it continues on an easterly routing for 2 miles (3.2 km) before curving to the southeast. After another 4 miles (6 km), the route turns to the north as it enters the community of Messengerville. Once in Messengerville, NY 392 ends at a junction with US 11 just west of Interstate 81.

== History ==
The east–west highway connecting the hamlets of Virgil to Messengerville in the town of Virgil was originally designated as part of NY 90 in the 1930 renumbering of state highways in New York. At the time, NY 90 began in Messengerville and headed northwest to Cortland via Virgil. This section of NY 90 remained unchanged for the next half-century, save for an April 1, 1981, highway maintenance swap that transferred ownership and maintenance of the Virgil–Messengerville segment's easternmost mile from Cortland County to the state of New York.

On April 1, 1980, ownership and maintenance of East Main Street and Virgil Road from NY 13 and NY 38 in the village of Dryden to the Tompkins–Cortland county line was transferred from Tompkins County to the state of New York as part of a highway maintenance swap between the two levels of government. One year later, on April 1, 1981, ownership and maintenance of CR 127 and the portion of CR 128 north of CR 127—collectively a single highway linking Virgil Road at the county line to NY 90 in Virgil—was given to the state as part of the aforementioned maintenance swap with Cortland County.

Following the second swap, NY 90 was truncated northward to Homer. Its former routing between Virgil and Cortland was redesignated as NY 215 while its old alignment from Virgil to Messengerville became part of NY 392, which also extended westward to Dryden over the newly acquired state highways. Reference markers along the Virgil–Messengerville stretch of NY 392 originally read "90" for the highway's former designation; however, they have since been replaced with markers reading "392".

== Major intersections ==
County	Location	mi	km	Destinations	Notes
Tompkins	Village of Dryden	0.00	0.00	NY 13 (Main Street) / NY 38 (South Street / North Street) – Cortland, Syracuse, Owego, Ithaca	Western terminus
Cortland	Virgil	5.99	9.64	NY 215 north – Cortland	Hamlet of Virgil; southern terminus of NY 215
Cortland	Virgil	13.12	21.11	US 11 – Cortland, Marathon, Binghamton	Eastern terminus; hamlet of Messengerville
1.000 mi = 1.609 km; 1.000 km = 0.621 mi

== See also ==
- List of county routes in Cortland County, New York
