= Harford, New York =

- Town
- Location within Cortland County and New York

- Location in the United States Harford (New York)
- Coordinates: 42°26′18″N 76°11′59″W
- Country: United States
- State: New York
- County: Cortland

Government
  - Type: Town Council
  - Town Supervisor: Raymond Marsh (D, R)
  - Town Council: Members' List: • Todd D. Loope (D, R); • L. Charles Rowland (D, R); • Daryl Cross (D, R); • David D. Stoner (D, R)

Area
  - Total: 24.17 sq mi (62.61 km^{2})
  - Land: 24.15 sq mi (62.55 km^{2})
  - Water: 0.023 sq mi (0.06 km^{2})
- Elevation: 1,552 ft (473 m)

Population (2010)
  - Total: 943
  - Estimate (2016): 928
  - Density: 38.4/sq mi (14.84/km^{2})
- Time zone: UTC-5 (Eastern (EST))
  - Summer (DST): UTC-4 (EDT)
- ZIP Codes: 13784 (Harford); 13835 (Harford Mills); 13053 (Dryden); 13803 (Marathon)
- Area code: 607
- FIPS code: 36-023-32160
- GNIS feature ID: 0979047
- Website: harfordny.com

Harford is a town in Cortland County, New York, United States. The population was 943 at the 2010 census. Harford is in the southwestern corner of Cortland County and is south of Cortland.

== History ==
Harford was in the former Central New York Military Tract in a tract called "Virgil". The area was first settled circa 1803.

The town was established in 1845 from part of the town of Virgil. By 1865, the population was 888.

In the 1970s, Cornell University bought extensive tracts of land for livestock research.

== Geography ==
According to the United States Census Bureau, the town has a total area of 24.2 square miles (62.6 km^{2}), of which 0.02 square miles (0.06 km^{2}), or 0.09%, is water.

The western town line is the border of Tompkins County, and the southern town boundary is the border of Tioga County.

New York State Route 38 runs diagonally across the southwestern corner of Harford. New York State Route 200 intersects New York State Route 221 east of Harford village.

The East Branch of Owego Creek, part of the Susquehanna River watershed, flows southward through the town. The northwest corner of the town drains northward to Virgil Creek, a tributary of Fall Creek, which flows west to Cayuga Lake in Ithaca and is thus part of the Lake Ontario watershed. Because of the steep hills in the north of the town, the larger settlements are in the south part.

== Demographics ==
Historical population
Census	Pop.	Note	%±
1850	926		—
1860	946		2.2%
1870	997		5.4%
1880	1,034		3.7%
1890	861		−16.7%
1900	753		−12.5%
1910	623		−17.3%
1920	553		−11.2%
1930	554		0.2%
1940	572		3.2%
1950	584		2.1%
1960	635		8.7%
1970	748		17.8%
1980	855		14.3%
1990	886		3.6%
2000	920		3.8%
2010	943		2.5%
2016 (est.)	928		−1.6%
U.S. Decennial Census

As of the census of 2000, there were 920 people, 341 households, and 246 families residing in the town. The population density was 38.1 inhabitants per square mile (14.7/km^{2}). There were 363 housing units at an average density of 15.0 per square mile (5.8/km^{2}). The racial makeup of the town was 97.72% White, 1.30% African American, 0.22% Native American, 0.11% Asian, and 0.65% from two or more races. Hispanic or Latino of any race were 0.22% of the population.

There were 341 households, out of which 36.1% had children under the age of 18 living with them, 59.8% were married couples living together, 8.2% had a female householder with no husband present, and 27.6% were non-families. 21.1% of all households were made up of individuals, and 7.9% had someone living alone who was 65 years of age or older. The average household size was 2.70 and the average family size was 3.15.

In the town, the population was spread out, with 30.0% under the age of 18, 6.1% from 18 to 24, 27.5% from 25 to 44, 25.0% from 45 to 64, and 11.4% who were 65 years of age or older. The median age was 36 years. For every 100 females, there were 99.6 males. For every 100 females age 18 and over, there were 100.6 males.

The median income for a household in the town was $33,750, and the median income for a family was $41,111. Males had a median income of $29,044 versus $20,673 for females. The per capita income for the town was $16,346. About 6.0% of families and 8.3% of the population were below the poverty line, including 4.5% of those under age 18 and 6.9% of those age 65 or over.

== Communities and locations in Harford ==
- Griggs Gulf – a small valley north of Harford Mills
- Harford – the hamlet of Harford, located on NY Route 38, is in the southwestern part of the town
- Harford Mills (formerly "South Harford") – a hamlet, southeast of Harford village, near the southern town line
