= Ellis Methodist Episcopal Church =

Historic church in New York, United States

- U.S. National Register of Historic Places
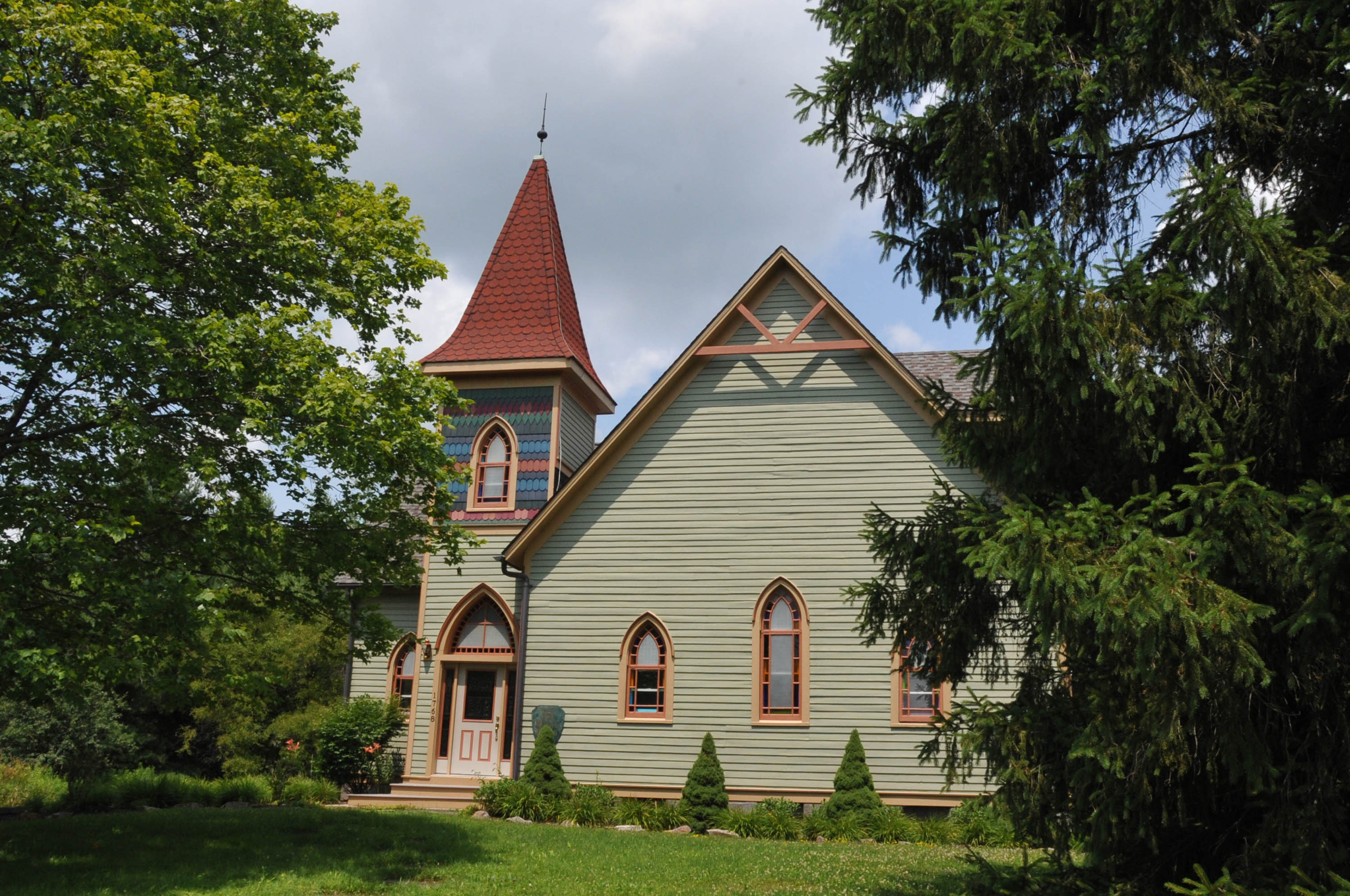

- Location within New York Location within the United States
- Location: Ellis Hollow Rd., Ellis Hollow, New York
- Coordinates: 42°25′0″N 76°23′0″W
- Area: less than one acre
- Built: 1896
- Architectural style: Late Victorian
- NRHP reference No.: 93000443
- Added to NRHP: May 27, 1993

Ellis Methodist Episcopal Church, also known as Ellis Hollow Community Church, is a historic Methodist Episcopal church located at Ellis Hollow in Tompkins County, New York. It was listed on the National Register of Historic Places in 1993.

The church was built in 1896. It is a frame building, about 30 by 46 feet (9.1 m × 14.0 m) in plan.

It was deemed significant "as a representative example of late-nineteenth century ecclesiastical architecture in a small rural community. The small frame building features restrained Gothic-inspired motifs. The interior is laid out in an Akron Plan, a popular arrangement for Methodist churches in the late nineteenth century. This plan is characterized by a diagonal orientation, with a corner entrance, a radial arrangement of pews, an altar in the opposite corner, and movable partitions marking the connection between the sanctuary and an adjacent Sunday school wing, allowing for the expansion of the auditorium when necessary."

It is located on the north side of County Route 110, about 500 feet (150 m) west of its intersection with Highway 164 and is a private residence.
