= Greek Peak Mountain Resort =

Ski resort near Cortland, New York

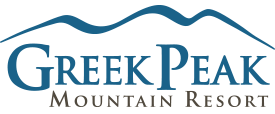

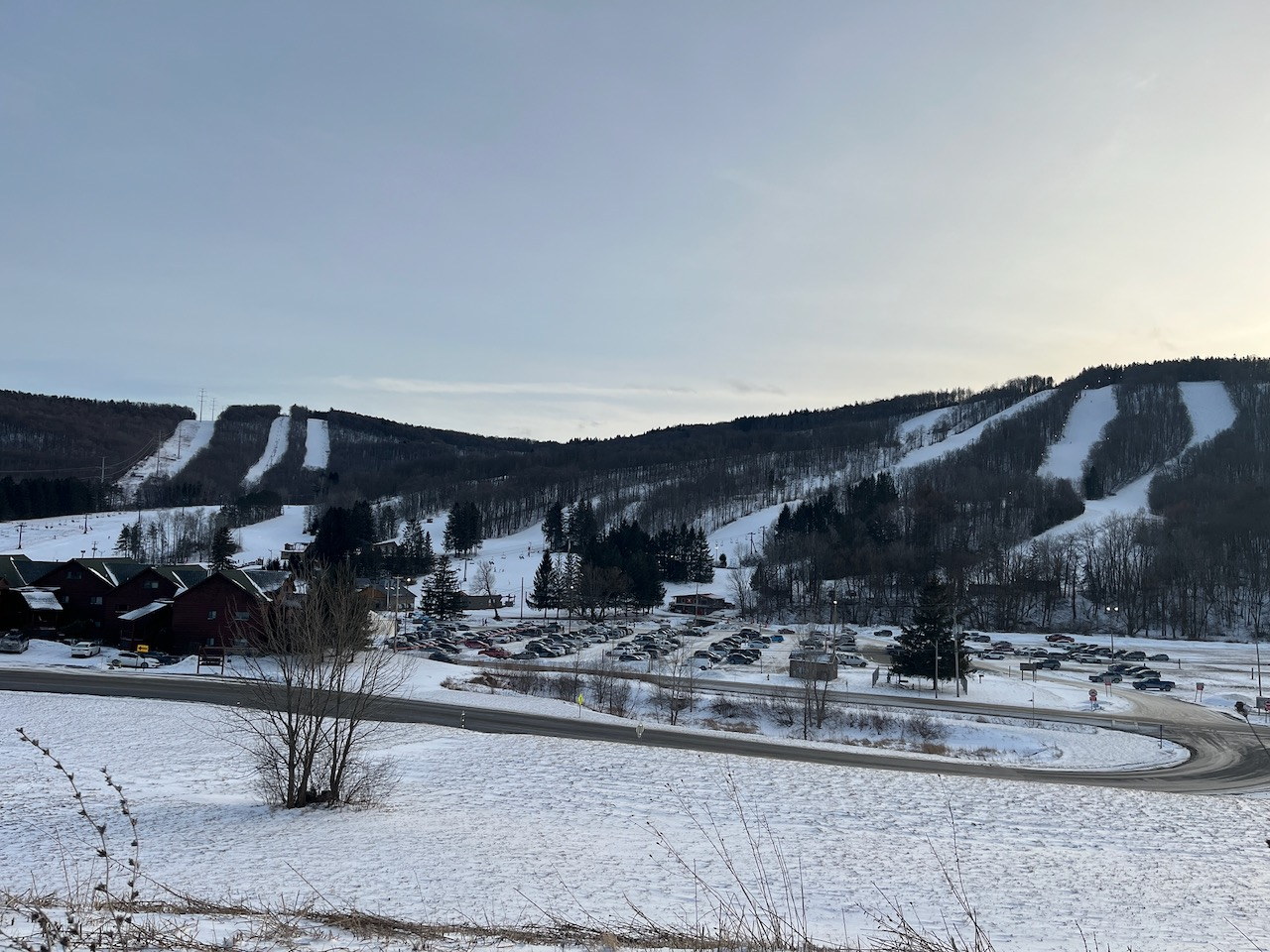
- Greek Peak Ski Resort January 2026
- Interactive map of Greek Peak Mountain Resort
- Location: Virgil, New York, United States
- Nearest city: Cortland, NY
- Coordinates: 42.5085996°N 76.1460485°W
- Vertical: 952 feet (290 m)
- Top elevation: 2,200 feet (670 m)
- Base elevation: 1,148 feet (350 m)
- Skiable area: 220 acres (0.89 km^{2})
- Trails: 55
- Longest run: 1.5 miles (2.4 km)
- Lift system: 6 chairlifts; 2 magic carpet lifts, 1 tubing carpet
- Terrain parks: 4
- Snowfall: 122 inches (310 cm)
- Night skiing: yes
- Website: greekpeak.net

Greek Peak Mountain Resort is an all-season ski resort in Cortland County, New York, United States, near the city of Cortland. It is the largest ski area in central New York and features skiing, snow tubing, and cross-country Nordic trails. Since opening, the resort has expanded to activities beyond winter sports including lift-serviced mountain biking, a mountain coaster, zip lines, and ropes courses. In 2009 a full-service hotel with indoor water park and conference amenities was added. Greek Peak's ski season typically begins shortly after Thanksgiving and ends in early April.

== Skiing Greek Peak ==
=== Overview ===
Located in Central New York, Greek Peak offers trails ranging from beginner to expert, with numerous natural trails aligned with the 18 mountain bike trails across the mountain. The resort offers day and night skiing, 7 days a week, weather permitting. It has terrain from the 40-degree Olympian to beginner runs such as Castor and Karyatis Way. Several terrain parks with various elements are also located on the mountain along with a progression park, offering individuals learning to use park features a safe learning path. Rental equipment and lessons are available for all skill levels, and babysitting is available for non-skiing infants and toddlers. In addition, Greek Peak is home of the ski team Greek Peak Ski Club and hosts NASTAR racing. Greek Peak lies inside an area that receives a moderate amount of lake-effect snow, enhancing the annual natural snowfall totals significantly compared to nearby areas. During the ski season a circulating shuttle bus service runs between the ski resort, Adventure Center, Hope Lake Lodge, and the Arcadia Village townhome development.

=== Mountain Statistics ===
The base elevation is 1148 ft and vertical drop is 952 ft. with 220 acres of ski terrain. The resort is surrounded by approximately 7000 acres of local and state protected park and forest land.

Greek Peak has 55 named trails as of 2025. 29 trails are lighted for night operations. Snowmaking covers approximately 83% of the trail system.

Easier – 20

More Difficult – 16

Most Difficult – 14

Expert – 5

Glade or Natural Trails (included in above count) – 11

Terrain Parks Trails (included in above count) – 3

=== Lodging ===
Hope Lake Lodge – 106-unit fractional ownership condo and hotel directly across the street from the ski area. The hotel includes Waterfalls Spa, Fitness Center, and Cascades Indoor Water Park.

Additional Lodging – Numerous townhomes and condominiums in the resort complex are available through vacation rental websites. The nearest additional lodging is in nearby Cortland.

=== Restaurants ===
Trax Pub and Grill – Slopeside bar and restaurant on upper floor of main lodge building. Features a large deck at the base of the mountain. Open year round.

Taverna – Cafeteria style eatery, located in main lodge building. Open during skiing season.

T-Bar – Outdoor bar on slopeside deck. Open during skiing season.

Waffle Shack – In base area. Open during skiing season.

Carver’s Steakhouse – Premium restaurant. Serves breakfast, lunch, and dinner. Located inside Hope Lake Lodge. Open year round.

=== Nordic Trails ===
Greek Peak maintains a series of cross-country Nordic style trails adjacent to Hope Lake Lodge running through Hope Lake Park. The trail system covers 15 km total and are groomed and open when conditions allow.

=== Tubing Center ===
Greek Peak tubing center is accessed through the Adventure Center area. The tubing center features snowmaking and is generally open for the season from early December until late March.

=== Other Activities \ Adventure Center ===
The resort has added a variety of four-season activities since the completion of Hope Lake Lodge in 2009 and the Adventure Center in 2011. These include:

- Cascades Indoor Water Park - Open all year

- Nor’easter Mountain Coaster – Open all year

- Zip Line Tours – Open all year

- Bike Park – Lift-serviced mountain bike park with 18 maintained trails of varying difficulty. A bike rental center is available in the base lodge, replacing the ski shop during the summer months. Generally open May through October.

- Aerial Ropes course – Generally open May through October

== History ==
=== 1950s ===
Greek Peak was founded in 1958 by members of the Cortland Ski Club. New York Governor W. Averell Harriman, who had previously been instrumental in the development of the Sun Valley ski resort in Idaho conducted the opening day ceremonies. By 1960, the ski area had two T-bar lifts and a base lodge known as the A-Frame.

=== 1960s ===
In 1962 Al Kryger became affiliated with the resort and was commissioned to build a chairlift for the ski area, which still operates today as Chair 2 and was the first chairlift built in the region. Through the 1960’s, Greek Peak expanded terrain, adding night skiing and snowmaking capacity. By 1969, Greek Peak had 11 trails across 100 acres of terrain serviced by 5 lifts – 1 Double, 2 T-Bar, 1 Poma, and 1 Rope Tow. Greek Peak also began an extensive partnership program with local schools, introducing many young skiers to the sport.

=== 1970s ===
During the 1970s Greek Peak expanded with additional terrain and lift upgrades and began development of townhomes and condominiums adjacent to the ski area. In 1974, the Greek Peak Adaptive Sports (GPAS) program serving people with various disabilities began. Between 1976 and 1980, approximately 120 townhome and condominium units were constructed in three developments. The eastern portion of the ski area was developed and chairlifts 4 and 5 were added to service this new terrain.

=== 1980s and 1990s ===
In the 1980s and 1990s notable changes included the removal of the Poma lift system in 1994, the replacement of the T-Bar lifts with a Double Chair lift in 1998, and the shortening and modification of the 1962 Chair 2 lift (then known as the “Yellow Chair”) to accommodate new “Magic Carpet” surface lifts for expanded learning terrain at the base.

=== 2000s ===
In the early 2000s the Kryger family announced plans to add a condominium hotel, water park, and conference amenities to the resort. To facilitate this new project and the anticipated additional business, they developed a park adjacent to the resort with a 23-acre impounded lake to support snowmaking capacity and increase year-round recreational options. In 2009 a 106-room hotel, known as Hope Lake Lodge, opened, and a separate additional condominium project was built during this time. Hope Lake Lodge has an attached indoor water park as well as multiple restaurant and conference options.

=== 2010s ===
The expansion of Greek Peak into a four season resort was completed in 2011 with the construction of the Adventure Center, which added a mountain coaster, zip lines, ropes courses, and an expanded tubing center.

In 2013 Greek Peak was forced to enter bankruptcy proceedings caused by the failure of the banking lender holding the debt for the Hope Lake Lodge development. This forced the Kryger family to relinquish ownership of the resort, with Elmira, NY based business owners John Meier and Marc Stemerman assuming ownership. Members of the Kryger family remained active in resort management.

Through the 2010s the resort continued making additional investments in the ski area and added other all-season activities. In 2013 a new Doppelmayr carpet-loaded Quad lift was added, replacing the Double chairlift installed in 1998, and expansions were made to the restaurant including a large slope-side deck. In 2014 lift-served mountain biking began using the new quad chairlift. The resort announced several significant investments in infrastructure capacity such as new water and air lines for snowmaking and lighting upgrades. In 2015, ownership purchased the nearby ski area Toggenburg with the intention to run both areas to better serve Central New York. In 2019, John and Christine Meier became sole owners of Greek Peak, with members of the Kryger family continuing to manage the resort.

=== 2020s ===
In 2021, the Toggenburg ski area was sold to the owner of nearby ski areas Song Mountain and Labrador Mountain and shut down, leaving sole focus on the Greek Peak resort. In 2022 the resort added a full-service campground and RV park, and a large multi-functional event building called The Lookout. At the ski resort, the double chairlift servicing the beginner (Alpha) slope was replaced with a triple relocated from Windham Ski Area, significantly increasing capacity.

A new major investment was announced at the end of the 2025-2026 ski season, with $3m of new snowmaking capacity and related upgrades added. This upgrade completed added snowmaking to all primary groomed trails, resulting in 95%+ snowmaking coverage for the mountain.

== Image Gallery ==
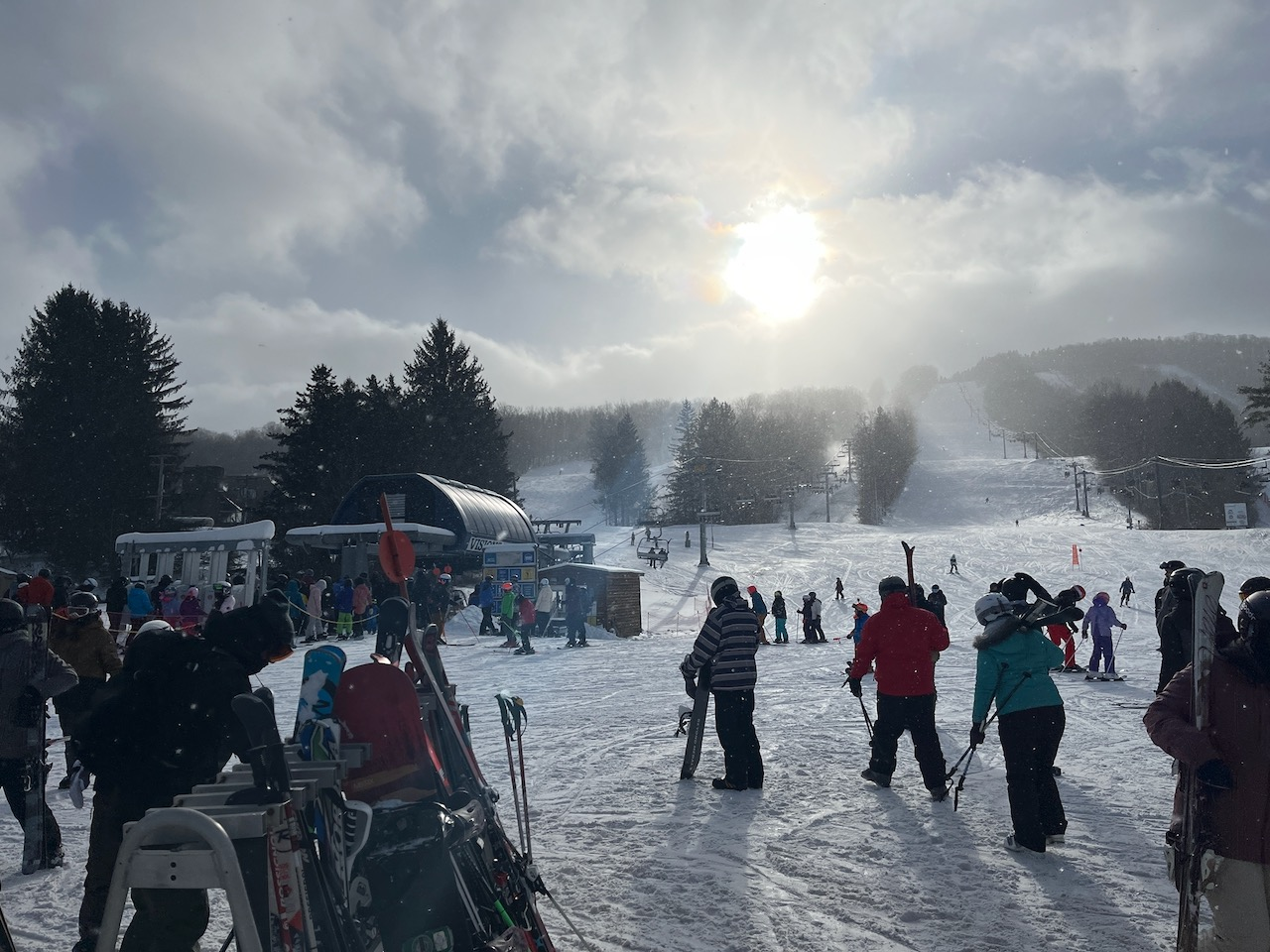
Greek Peak Main Base Area, 2024
