= Dryden, New York =

- Town
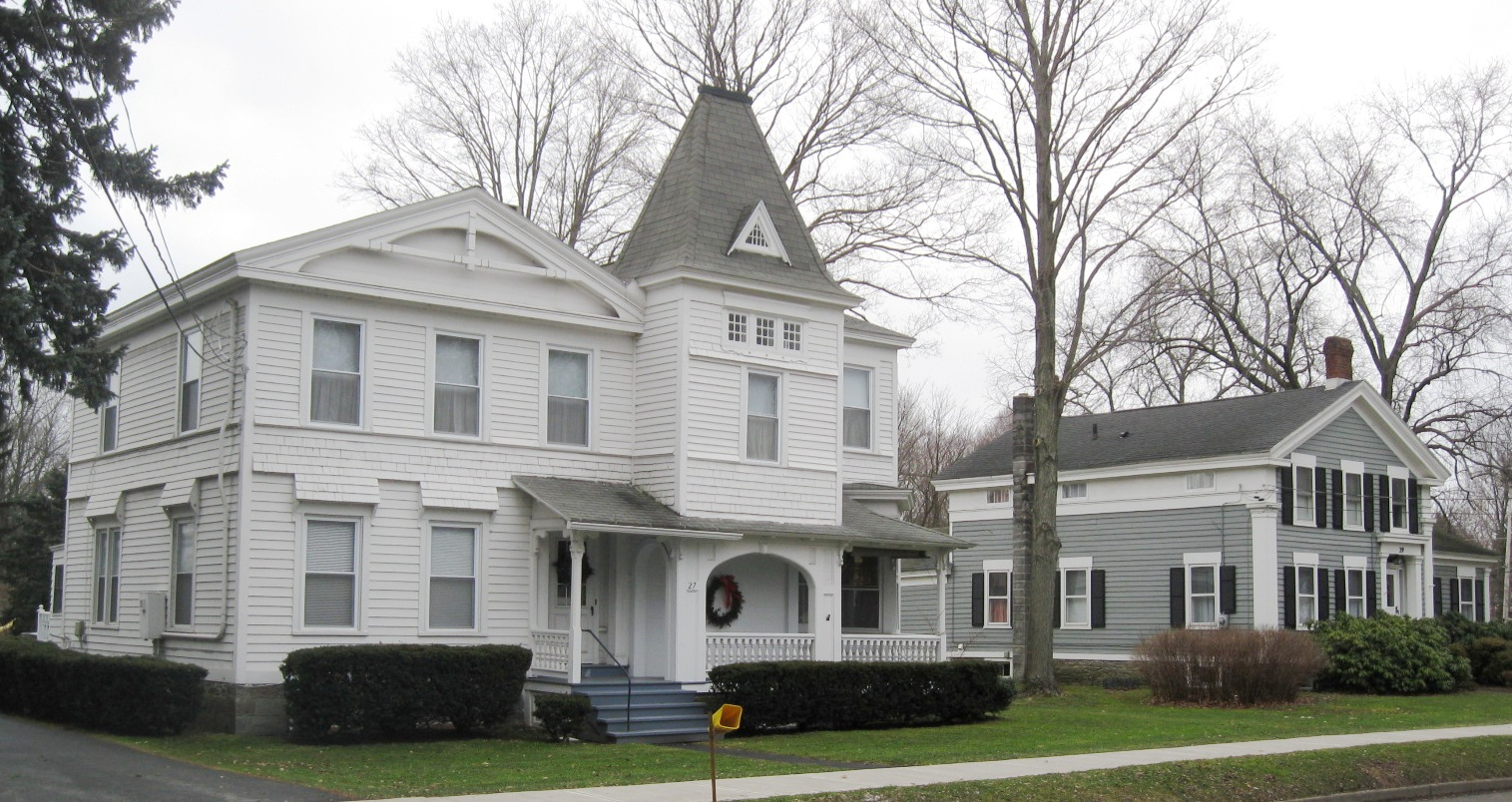
- Homes in Dryden's historic district (2010)

- Location of Dryden in New York
- Coordinates: 42°29′21″N 76°21′35″W
- Country: United States
- State: New York
- County: Tompkins

Area
  - Total: 94.33 sq mi (244.31 km^{2})
  - Land: 93.64 sq mi (242.53 km^{2})
  - Water: 0.69 sq mi (1.79 km^{2}) 0.31%

Population (2020)
  - Total: 14,029 ▼
  - Estimate (2021): 13,841
  - Density: 159.3/sq mi (61.52/km^{2})
- Time zone: UTC-5 (Eastern (EST))
  - Summer (DST): UTC-4 (EDT)
- FIPS code: 36-109-20962
- Website: www.townofdrydenny.gov

Dryden is a town in Tompkins County, New York, United States. The population was 14,435 at the 2010 census. The town administers an area that includes two villages, one also named Dryden and one named Freeville, as well as a number of hamlets. The town is on the county's eastern border, east of Ithaca, in the Finger Lakes region.

== History ==
The region was part of the Central New York Military Tract, land given as compensation to soldiers of the American Revolution. Robert Harpur, a Clerk in the office of the New York State Surveyor General who named numerous New York townships in 1790 based on his own classical studies, named Dryden for John Dryden (1631–1700), the English poet and a translator of the classics (including the works of Virgil, with the town of Virgil being the next town east of Dryden). Dryden was also the translator of Plutarch's work Lives of the Noble Greeks and Romans, which Harpur likely sourced for many of the names in the Military Tract.

The first settler arrived around 1797. The town of Dryden was established in 1803 from the town of Ulysses. In 1856, some areas in the far southwest part of Dryden were ceded to the growing village of Caroline, New York, created from the Town of Spencer in 1811.

In 2009, Dryden's Southworth Library sold an original manuscript of an Abraham Lincoln speech that had been delivered at the White House after his re-election. The document had been in the library's possession since 1926. It sold for $3.44 million, a record-high selling price for an American historical document at an auction.

The Dryden District School No. 5 was listed on the National Register of Historic Places in 1984, as was the Ellis Methodist Episcopal Church in 1993.

== Geography ==
According to the United States Census Bureau, the town has a total area of 94.2 square miles (243.9 km^{2}), of which, 93.9 square miles (243.1 km^{2}) of it is land and 0.3 square miles (0.8 km^{2}) of it (0.31%) is water.

The east town line is the border of Cortland County, where it borders Virgil, New York and Harford, New York. Continuing clockwise, bordering towns are Caroline, New York, Danby, New York, Ithaca (town), New York, Lansing (town), New York, and Groton (town), New York.

New York State Route 13 intersects New York State Route 38 at Dryden village. New York State Route 79 crosses the southwest part of the town, and New York State Route 366 crosses the central part and intersects NY-38 in Freeville. A small part of New York State Route 34B crosses the northwest corner of Dryden.

Cascadilla Creek flows out the west side of Dryden, as does Fall Creek and, in the far southwest corner of the town, Six Mile Creek. Virgil Creek is a major tributary of Fall Creek, entering it in Freeville after passing through the village of Dryden.

== Demographics ==
Historical population
Census	Pop.	Note	%±
1820	3,951		—
1830	5,206		31.8%
1840	5,446		4.6%
1850	5,122		−5.9%
1860	4,962		−3.1%
1870	4,818		−2.9%
1880	4,805		−0.3%
1890	4,043		−15.9%
1900	3,785		−6.4%
1910	3,590		−5.2%
1920	3,186		−11.3%
1930	3,534		10.9%
1940	3,947		11.7%
1950	5,006		26.8%
1960	7,353		46.9%
1970	9,770		32.9%
1980	12,156		24.4%
1990	13,251		9.0%
2000	13,532		2.1%
2010	14,435		6.7%
2020	14,029		−2.8%
2021 (est.)	13,841	▼	−1.3%
U.S. Decennial Census

As of the census of 2010, there were 14,435 people, 6,016 households, and 3,555 families residing in the town. The population density was 153.9 inhabitants per square mile (59.4/km^{2}). There were 6,418 housing units at an average density of 68.4 per square mile (26.4/km^{2}). The racial makeup of the town was 93.7% White, 4.2% Black or African American, 1.2% Native American, 2.7% Asian, 0.1% Pacific Islander, and 1.2% from other races. Hispanic or Latino of any race were 3.1% of the population.

There were 6,016 households, out of which 26.0% had children under the age of 18 living with them, 44.5% were married couples living together, 10.1% had a female householder with no husband present, and 40.9% were non-families. 27.5% of all households were made up of individuals, and 6.9% had someone living alone who was 65 years of age or older. The average household size was 2.36 and the average family size was 2.85.

In the town, the population was spread out, with 28.3% under the age of 21, 7.6% from 20 to 24, 25.4% from 25 to 44, 29.0% from 45 to 64, and 11.3% who were 65 years of age or older. The median age was 37.6 years. For every 100 females, there were 100.0 males. For every 100 females age 18 and over, there were 95.6 males.

The median income for a household in the town was $60,514, and the median income for a family was $72,596. Males had a median income of $46,587 versus $45,200 for females. The per capita income for the town was $30,866. About 4.4% of families and 9.5% of the population were below the poverty line, including 11.3% of those under age 18 and 2.6% of those age 65 or over.

Of the population 25 years and over, 23.5% had a graduate or professional degree, 20.2% had a bachelor's degree, 9.1% had an associate's, 18.7% had matriculated at a college, 21.3% had a high-school diploma, and 7.2% had not graduated from high school.

More than half of all housing units in the town were built between 1970 and 2000. Of the total housing stock, the median value was $155,800, and the median monthly rent was $771.

== Communities and locations in the town of Dryden ==
- Bethel Grove – A hamlet on NY-79 in the southwest part of the town.
- Dryden – A village located on NY-13.
- Dryden Lake – A small lake near the east town line.
- Dryden Lake Wildlife Management Area – A conservation area by the east town line.
- Ellis (or "Ellis Hollow") – A hamlet in the southwest part of the town. The Ellis Methodist Episcopal Church was listed on the National Register of Historic Places in 1993.
- Etna – A hamlet located near Ithaca.
- Freeville – A village located on NY-38.
- Hibbards Corners – A location in the western part of the town.
- Howland Corners – A location at the west town line on NY-34B.
- Lacy Corners – A hamlet north of Dryden village.
- Malloryville – A location in the northeast part of Dryden.
- McLean – A hamlet and census-designated places shared with Groton, located 6.6 miles (10.6 km) west-southwest of Cortland.
- Peruton – A location by the north town line.
- Red Mills – A hamlet northeast of Freeville.
- Smith Corners – A location at the west town line south of Howland Corners.
- Varna – A hamlet located near the west town line on NY-366.
- West Dryden – A hamlet in the northwest part of Dryden. The West Dryden Methodist Episcopal Church was listed on the National Register of Historic Places in 1991.
- Willow Glen – A location west of Dryden village on NY-13.

== Education ==
Most of Dryden Town is in the Dryden Central School District. The zoned comprehensive high school of that district is Dryden High School.

Other school districts covering portions of the town include Groton Central School District, Lansing Central School District, and Ithaca City School District. The zoned comprehensive high school of the Ithaca school district is Ithaca High School.

== Sports ==
- Ithaca-Dryden Speedway (aka John Wood and Dryden Speedway) was a 1/3-mile (0.54 km) dirt oval racing facility located near the hamlet of Freeville that operated from 1954 through 1966. The raceway was one of a series of venues in the Twin Tiers region of New York and Pennsylvania where drivers began their careers before becoming known on the state and national scene. (Note: Geolocation of Ithaca-Dryden Speedway: 42.4837°N 76.3536°W)

== Notable people ==
- Jacob M. Appel — author
- Cueball Carmichael — professional wrestler, trainer and promoter
- John Wilbur Dwight — former US congressman
- Milo Goodrich — former US congressman
- Michael S. Hall – adjutant general of New York
- Richard P. Marvin — former US congressman
- John Miller — first governor of North Dakota
