= West Dryden Methodist Episcopal Church =

Historic church in New York, United States

- U.S. National Register of Historic Places
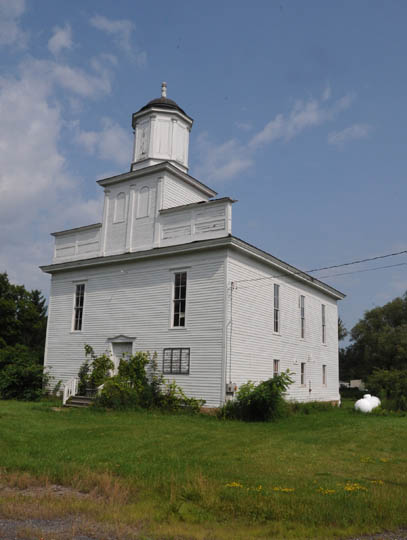

- Location within New York Location within the United States
- Location: Jct. of W. Dryden and Sheldon Rds., Dryden, New York
- Coordinates: 42°31′2″N 76°24′54″W
- Area: less than one acre
- Built: 1832
- Architect: Conover, Peter
- Architectural style: Federal
- NRHP reference No.: 91001029
- Added to NRHP: August 09, 1991

West Dryden Methodist Episcopal Church is a historic Methodist Episcopal church located at Dryden in Tompkins County, New York. It is a two-story, frame church structure built in 1832 in the Federal style. It was remodeled during 1870–1890. It features a tower with an octagonal belfry. Since 1966 it has been used as the West Dryden Community Center.

It was listed on the National Register of Historic Places in 1991.
