= Virgil, New York =

- Town
- Location within Cortland County and New York

- Location in the United States Virgil, New York (New York)
- Coordinates: 42°30′57″N 76°09′59″W
- Country: United States
- State: New York
- County: Cortland

Area
  - Total: 47.40 sq mi (122.76 km^{2})
  - Land: 47.37 sq mi (122.69 km^{2})
  - Water: 0.027 sq mi (0.07 km^{2})
- Elevation: 1,424 ft (434 m)

Population (2010)
  - Total: 2,401
  - Estimate (2016): 2,387
  - Density: 50.4/sq mi (19.46/km^{2})
- Time zone: UTC-5 (Eastern (EST))
  - Summer (DST): UTC-4 (EDT)
- ZIP Codes: 13045 (Cortland); 13053 (Dryden); 13803 (Marathon)
- Area Code: 607
- FIPS code: 36-023-77596
- GNIS feature ID: 0979588
- Website: virgilny.gov

Virgil is a town in Cortland County, New York, United States. The population was 2,401 at the 2010 census. The name is from the Roman poet Virgil. The town is in the southwestern part of Cortland County and is south of the city of Cortland.

== History ==
The region was part of the Central New York Military Tract used to pay soldiers of the American Revolution. "Virgil" was the name of one of the townships of the Military Tract, this name being assigned by a clerk interested in the Classics.

Virgil was first settled circa 1792. The town was formed from the town of Homer in 1804. Virgil was reduced by the formation of the towns of Harford and Lapeer in 1845. Virgil also lost territory to the towns of Cortlandville and Freetown.

In 1865, the population was 2,009.

== Geography ==
According to the United States Census Bureau, the town has a total area of 47.4 square miles (122.7 km^{2}), of which 47.3 square miles (122.6 km^{2}) is land and 0.04 square miles (0.1 km^{2}), or 0.08%, is water. The eastern half of the town drains mainly via Gridley Creek to the Tioughnioga River, which flows southwards and is part of the Susquehanna River watershed, which empties into the Atlantic Ocean through the Chesapeake Bay. Water from a small southern part of the town flows south towards the East Branch of Owego Creek, also part of the Susquehanna watershed. The western half of the town, part of the Allegheny Plateau, drains primarily via Virgil Creek, as well as other streams, westward to Fall Creek, part of the Cayuga Lake watershed leading north towards Lake Ontario and thence to the Atlantic Ocean via the Gulf of St. Lawrence. Virgil Creek, which shares a through-valley with Gridley Creek, is notable for rising above the Valley Heads Moraine and cutting through it from above.

The western town line is shared with Dryden in Tompkins County. Most of the eastern town line is shared with Freetown. The northern and part of the eastern town boundaries are shared with Cortlandville; the eastern part follows the Tioughnioga River. The southern town line separates Virgil from Harford and Lapeer.

U.S. Route 11 and Interstate 81 in New York pass near the eastern town line by the Tioghnioga River. New York State Route 215, which begins in Cortland, ends at the intersection with New York State Route 392 in the hamlet of Virgil. New York State Route 13 cuts across the northwestern corner of the town.

== Demographics ==
Historical population
Census	Pop.	Note	%±
1820	2,411		—
1830	3,912		62.3%
1840	4,541		16.1%
1850	2,231		−50.9%
1860	2,223		−0.4%
1870	1,880		−15.4%
1880	1,854		−1.4%
1890	1,518		−18.1%
1900	1,326		−12.6%
1910	1,136		−14.3%
1920	1,069		−5.9%
1930	1,137		6.4%
1940	1,257		10.6%
1950	1,257		0.0%
1960	1,420		13.0%
1970	1,692		19.2%
1980	2,053		21.3%
1990	2,172		5.8%
2000	2,287		5.3%
2010	2,401		5.0%
2016 (est.)	2,387	▼	−0.6%
U.S. Decennial Census

As of the census of 2000, there were 2,287 people, 833 households, and 623 families residing in the town. The population density was 48.3 inhabitants per square mile (18.6/km^{2}). There were 982 housing units at an average density of 20.7 per square mile (8.0/km^{2}). The racial makeup of the town was 97.46% White, 0.61% African American, 0.13% Native American, 0.22% Asian, 0.22% from other races, and 1.36% from two or more races. Hispanic or Latino of any race were 1.01% of the population.

There were 833 households, out of which 36.3% had children under the age of 18 living with them, 62.4% were married couples living together, 7.0% had a female householder with no husband present, and 25.2% were non-families. 18.1% of all households were made up of individuals, and 6.1% had someone living alone who was 65 years of age or older. The average household size was 2.73 and the average family size was 3.08.

In the town, the population was spread out, with 27.2% under the age of 18, 6.1% from 18 to 24, 30.6% from 25 to 44, 26.6% from 45 to 64, and 9.5% who were 65 years of age or older. The median age was 37 years. For every 100 females, there were 101.0 males. For every 100 females age 18 and over, there were 101.7 males.

The median income for a household in the town was $42,292, and the median income for a family was $45,402. Males had a median income of $31,974 versus $23,788 for females. The per capita income for the town was $19,024. About 5.2% of families and 6.7% of the population were below the poverty line, including 8.1% of those under age 18 and 2.6% of those age 65 or over.

== Communities and locations in Virgil ==
- East Virgil – A hamlet in the southeastern part of the town on NY-392.
- Franks Corners – A location in the southwestern part of the town.
- Gee Hill – An area on the western edge of the town, originally settled by John Gee and his family in 1795. This was the third settlement in the town.
- Greek Peak Mountain Resort – A skiing area on NY-392, east of Virgil hamlet.
- Hollenbeck Hollow – A valley near the western town line.
- Hollenbeck's Cidermill – Hollenbeck's was founded by Mr. and Mrs. Hollenbeck. It is near the center of Virgil and opened in 1932.
- Messengerville (also known as "State Bridge") – A hamlet at the eastern town line where NY-392 terminates at its intersection with U.S. Route 11.
- Skyline Raceway Motorsports Park – Auto racing facility
- Virgil – The hamlet of Virgil at the junction of Routes NY-215 and NY-392. Virgil Creek flows through this community.
- Virgil Elementary School is on Church Street and Route 392 in the center of Virgil. The playground is the only park in Virgil. The playground has a walking trail featuring exercise places. It was extended with a gazebo on the new trail. The new trail goes to the courthouse and does not have schoolchildren go there during school hours.

== Notable person ==
- Martha B. O'Donnell (1836-1925) — temperance activist, suffragist, newspaper and magazine editor and publisher
