= Former Groton High School (Groton, New York) =

- Schoolhouse Gardens Apartments
- U.S. National Register of Historic Places
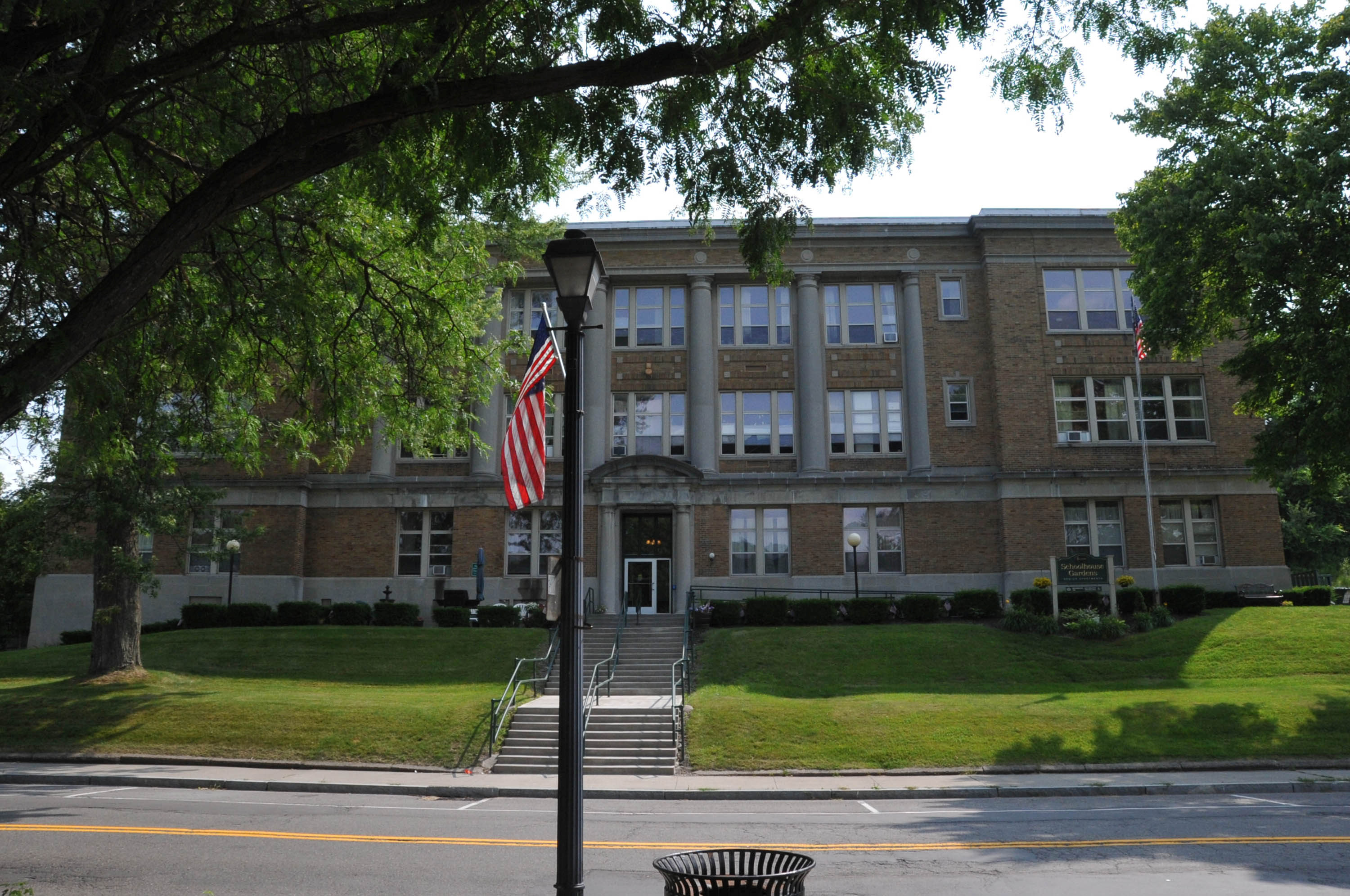
- The Schoolhouse Gardens Apartment Building

- Location within New York Location within the United States
- Location: 177 Main St., Groton, New York
- Coordinates: 42°35′17″N 76°22′0″W
- Area: 1.3 acres (0.53 ha)
- Built: 1919
- Architect: Clark, Carl Wesley
- Architectural style: Classical Revival
- NRHP reference No.: 92000953
- Added to NRHP: July 24, 1992

Schoolhouse Gardens Apartments is a historic school building located in Groton, NY. It was built in 1919–1920 and features Classical Revival details, such as six monumental engaged Doric order columns. The front block of the building is three stories in height with a rear projection set back and reduced in height to two, then one, stories and forming a T-shaped configuration. The building ceased being used for educational purposes in 1975.

It was listed on the National Register of Historic Places in 1994.
