= Groton (village), New York =

Groton, New York
- Village
- Location within the state of New York
- Coordinates: 42°35′13″N 76°21′54″W
- Country: United States
- State: New York
- County: Tompkins
- Settled: 1795
- Incorporated: June 11, 1860
- Named after: Uncertain, possibly named after Groton, Connecticut and Groton, Massachusetts, from where many early settlers hailed

Government
  - Mayor: Chris Neville

Area
  - Total: 1.74 sq mi (4.50 km^{2})
  - Land: 1.74 sq mi (4.50 km^{2})
  - Water: 0 sq mi (0.00 km^{2})
- Elevation: 997 ft (304 m)

Population (2020)
  - Total: 2,145
  - Density: 1,234.6/sq mi (476.67/km^{2})
- Time zone: UTC-5 (Eastern (EST))
  - Summer (DST): UTC-4 (EDT)
- ZIP code: 13073
- Area code: 607
- FIPS code: 36-30961
- GNIS feature ID: 0951849
- Website: www.grotonny.gov

Groton is a village in Tompkins County, New York, United States. The population was 2,363 at the 2010 census.

The Village of Groton is near the center of the Town of Groton and is northeast of Ithaca and west of Cortland.

== History ==
The village lies within the former Central New York Military Tract and was first settled by outsiders around 1795. Before then, the only purpose of the land surrounding Groton was to host the winding trails of the Native Americans that once lived in central New York. Also, they used the Owasco Inlet as a water source for their people and possibly for transportation, though it is very shallow at some points. The village was within Cayuga County until Tompkins County was formed in 1817.

The Village of Groton was incorporated in 1860.

The village was served by the Southern Central Railroad and then later by the Lehigh Valley Railroad after the former was incorporated into the latter's system.

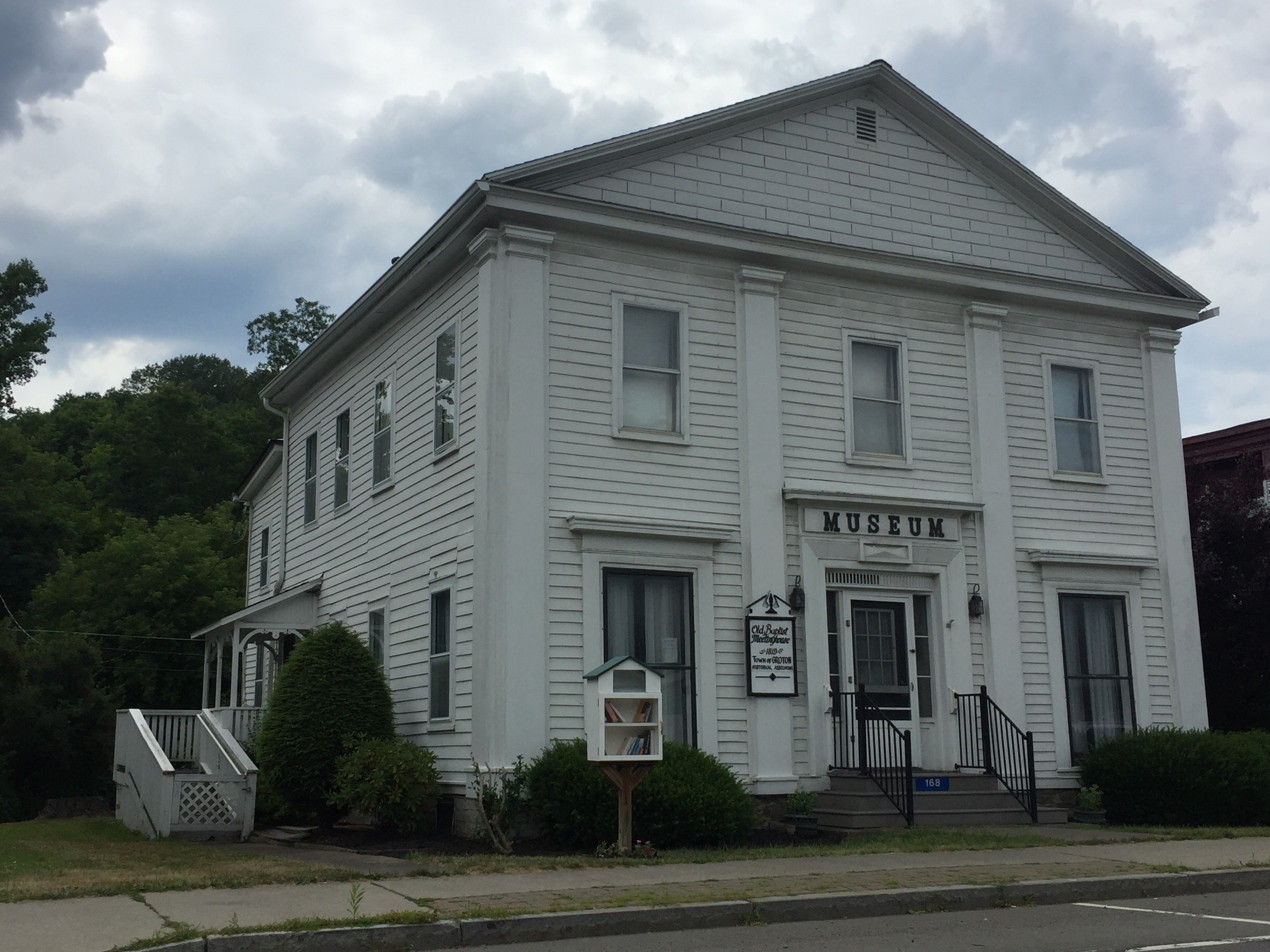
Groton Historical Association Museum

The Groton Historical Association Museum, at 172 Main Street, occupies a former Baptist meetinghouse.

The Groton High School was listed on the National Register of Historic Places in 1992. Students now attend Groton Junior/Senior High School.

== Geography ==
Groton is located at 42°35′12″N 76°21′53″W (42.586922, -76.364908).

According to the United States Census Bureau, the village has a total area of 1.7 square miles (4.5 km^{2}). None of the area is covered with water.

New York State Route 38 intersects New York State Route 222 in the village.

== Demographics ==
Historical population
Census	Pop.	Note	%±
1870	863		—
1880	923		7.0%
1890	1,280		38.7%
1900	1,344		5.0%
1910	1,260		−6.2%
1920	2,235		77.4%
1930	2,004		−10.3%
1940	2,087		4.1%
1950	2,150		3.0%
1960	2,123		−1.3%
1970	2,112		−0.5%
1980	2,313		9.5%
1990	2,398		3.7%
2000	2,470		3.0%
2010	2,363		−4.3%
2020	2,145		−9.2%
U.S. Decennial Census

As of the census of 2000, there were 2,470 people, 960 households, and 627 families residing in the village. The population density was 1,427.1 inhabitants per square mile (551.0/km^{2}). There were 1,028 housing units at an average density of 593.9 per square mile (229.3/km^{2}). The racial makeup of the village was 97.29% White, 0.57% Black or African American, 0.16% Native American, 0.08% Asian, 0.20% from other races, and 1.70% from two or more races. Hispanic or Latino of any race were 0.36% of the population.

There were 960 households, out of which 34.6% had children under the age of 18 living with them, 48.8% were married couples living together, 12.6% had a female householder with no husband present, and 34.6% were non-families. 28.6% of all households were made up of individuals, and 13.1% had someone living alone who was 65 years of age or older. The average household size was 2.46 and the average family size was 3.05.

In the village, the population was spread out, with 27.4% under the age of 18, 5.8% from 18 to 24, 28.1% from 25 to 44, 22.0% from 45 to 64, and 16.7% who were 65 years of age or older. The median age was 38 years. For every 100 females, there were 90.1 males. For every 100 females age 18 and over, there were 79.9 males.

The median income for a household in the village was $36,047, and the median income for a family was $43,563. Males had a median income of $31,250 versus $24,000 for females. The per capita income for the village was $18,108. About 3.5% of families and 5.2% of the population were below the poverty line, including 7.2% of those under age 18 and 3.3% of those age 65 or over.

== Education ==
The village is in the Groton Central School District.
