= Dryden Lake =

Lake in New York, United States

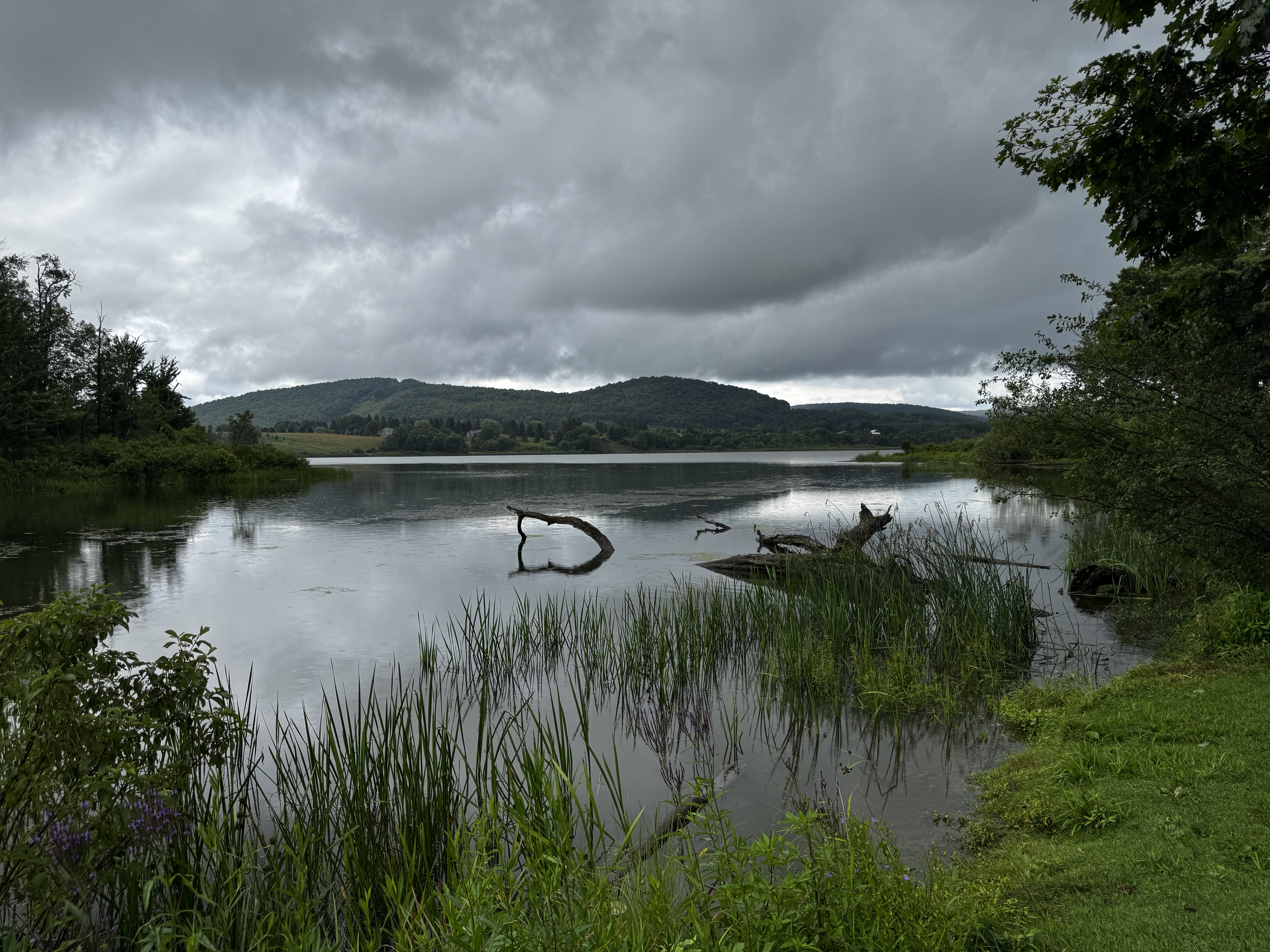

- Location within New York Location within the United States
- Location: Tompkins County, New York, United States
- Coordinates: 42°27′50″N 76°16′49″W
- Basin countries: United States
- Surface area: 117 acres (0.47 km^{2})
- Average depth: 4 feet (1.2 m)
- Max. depth: 12 ft (3.7 m)
- Shore length^{1}: 2.1 miles (3.4 km)
- Surface elevation: 1,155 ft (352 m)
- Settlements: Dryden, New York
- ^{1} Shore length is not a well-defined measure.

Dryden Lake is located near Dryden, New York. Fish species present in the lake include bluegill, yellow perch, pickerel, and pumpkinseed sunfish. There is access via state owned boat launch on West Lake Road, 1 mile south of Dryden. No motors are allowed on this lake.

The lake was created in 1803 by James Lacy, who constructed a dam on Virgil Creek.
