= Varna, New York =

Hamlet in New York, United States

Coordinates: 42°27′18″N 76°26′17″W

Varna is a hamlet (and census-designated place) located in Tompkins County, New York, United States. It is within the Town of Dryden. As of the 2020 census, Varna had a population of 767.

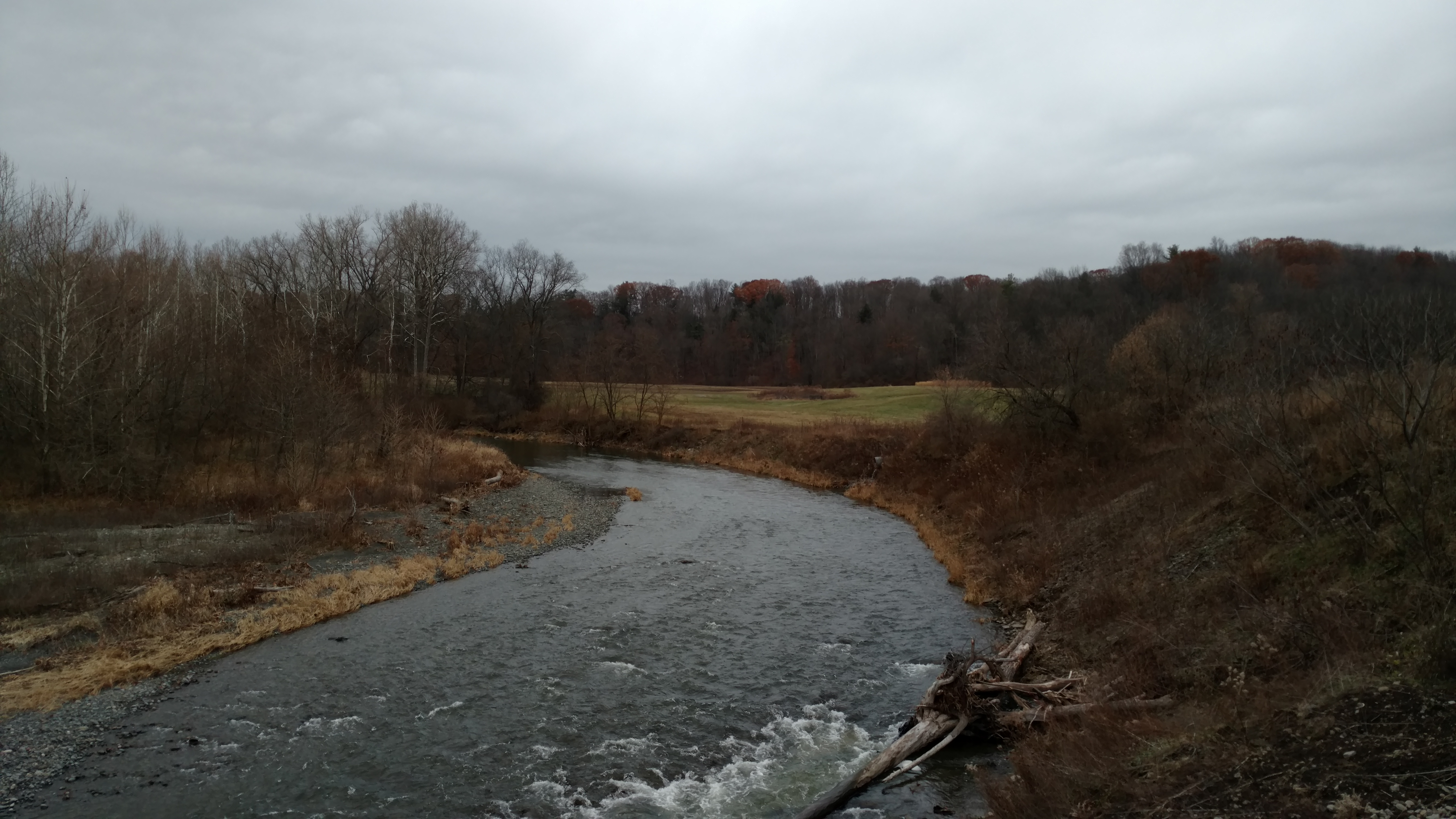
Fall Creek in Varna, New York

Varna is located near the west town line on New York State Route 366 (Dryden Road). Fall Creek flows past the town to Cayuga Lake.

== Education ==
The CDP is in the Ithaca City School District. The zoned comprehensive high school of the district is Ithaca High School.
