= McLean, New York =

- Hamlet and CDP
- Location within New York Location within the United States
- Coordinates: 42°33′07″N 76°17′28″W
- Country: United States
- State: New York
- County: Tompkins
- Elevation: 1,122 ft (342 m)
- Time zone: UTC-5 (Eastern (EST))
  - Summer (DST): UTC-4 (EDT)
- ZIP code: 13102
- Area code: 607
- GNIS feature ID: 956826

McLean is a hamlet (and census-designated place) in Tompkins County, New York, United States. As of the 2020 census, McLean had a population of 378. The community is located in the town of McLean, 6.6 miles (10.6 km) west-southwest of Cortland. McLean has a post office with ZIP code 13102, which opened on June 30, 1826.

== Education ==
Dryden Village is in the Dryden Central School District. The zoned comprehensive high school is Dryden High School.
