= Virgil Creek =

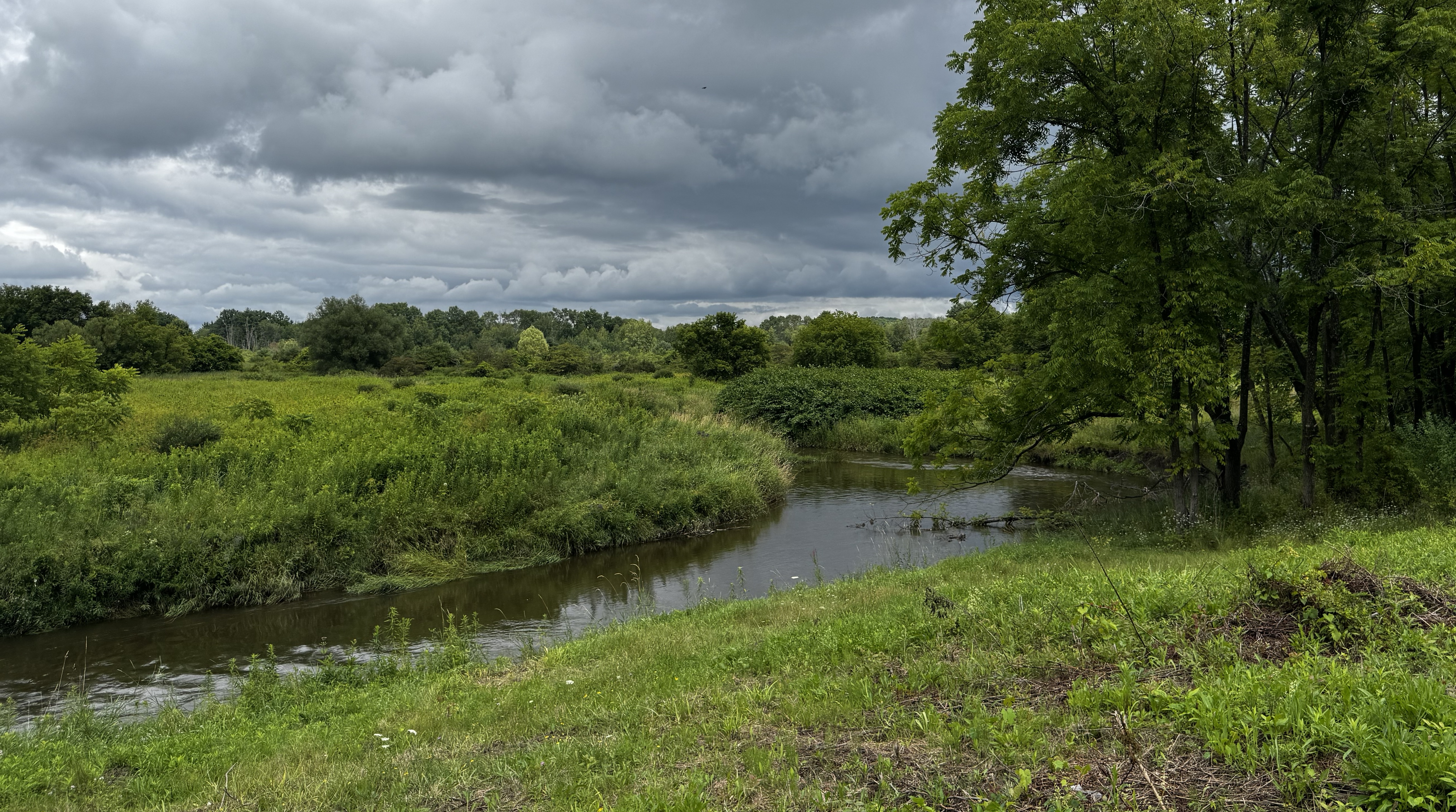
- A segment of Virgil Creek, shortly before it flows into Fall Creek

Location
- Country: United States
- State: New York

Physical characteristics
- Mouth: Fall Creek
  - location: Freeville, New York, United States
  - coordinates: 42°30′16″N 76°21′33″W
- Basin size: 40.6–40.9 mi^{2} (105–106 km^{2})

Virgil Creek is a river located in Tompkins and Cortland Counties, New York. It originates near Virgil, New York, and flows into Fall Creek by Freeville, New York. The creek has several tributaries and drains the man-made Dryden Lake. Throughout the 20th century, periodic flooding caused substantial damage to the town of Dryden and the surrounding land, which led to the construction of a dry dam to regulate the creek's flow, which was completed in 1998.

== Watershed ==
Its watershed is approximately 40.6–40.9 square miles (105–106 km^{2}) of land across Tompkins and Cortland Counties. The creek originates near Virgil, New York, and flows roughly westward, turning north before reaching Fall Creek. Major tributaries to the creek include Hollenbeck Hollow Creek, Egypt Creek, and outflow from the man-made Dryden Lake.

In the 1990s, the creek's watershed was largely forested or used for agricultural purposes.

== History ==
In the 19th century, several mills were built along Virgil Creek, including in Freeville and in Dryden.

=== Flooding ===
There was little regulation of Virgil Creek's flow until the late 20th century, and it periodically flooded, causing damage to Dryden and the surrounding areas. There were significant floods in 1935, 1964, 1969, 1972, and 1975. A 1981 flood caused $3 million in damage, spurring discussions between local towns, Tompkins County, and the state about projects that would alleviate the issue. After years of planning, a dry dam was built. It was completed in the summer of 1998, and has successfully lowered the number of times that the creek floods.

== Discharge ==
Virgil Creek's discharge has periodically been measured. In June 1963 the flow rate at its mouth was measured at 23.8 cubic feet (0.67 m^{3}) per second. In November 2023, it was measured to be 21.1 cubic feet (0.60 m^{3}) per second. From 1973 to 1976, the United States Geological Survey (USGS) maintained a gauge on the creek by Freeville, including water from 40.3 square miles (104 km^{2}) of its watershed. In 1975, the mean annual flow rate was 55.409 cubic feet (1.5690 m^{3}) per second, peaking in April and reaching its lowest point in July.

From October 2002 to September 2004, the USGS operated a gauge in Dryden, which included 29.7 square miles (77 km^{2}) of the creek's watershed. In 2003, this section of the creek's mean annual flow rate was 68.974 cubic feet (1.9531 m^{3}) per second; the mean flow rate by month peaked at 154.226 cubic feet (4.3672 m^{3}) per second in March, and was at its lowest in December, at a rate of 22.518 cubic feet (0.6376 m^{3}) per second.
