= Fall Creek (New York) =

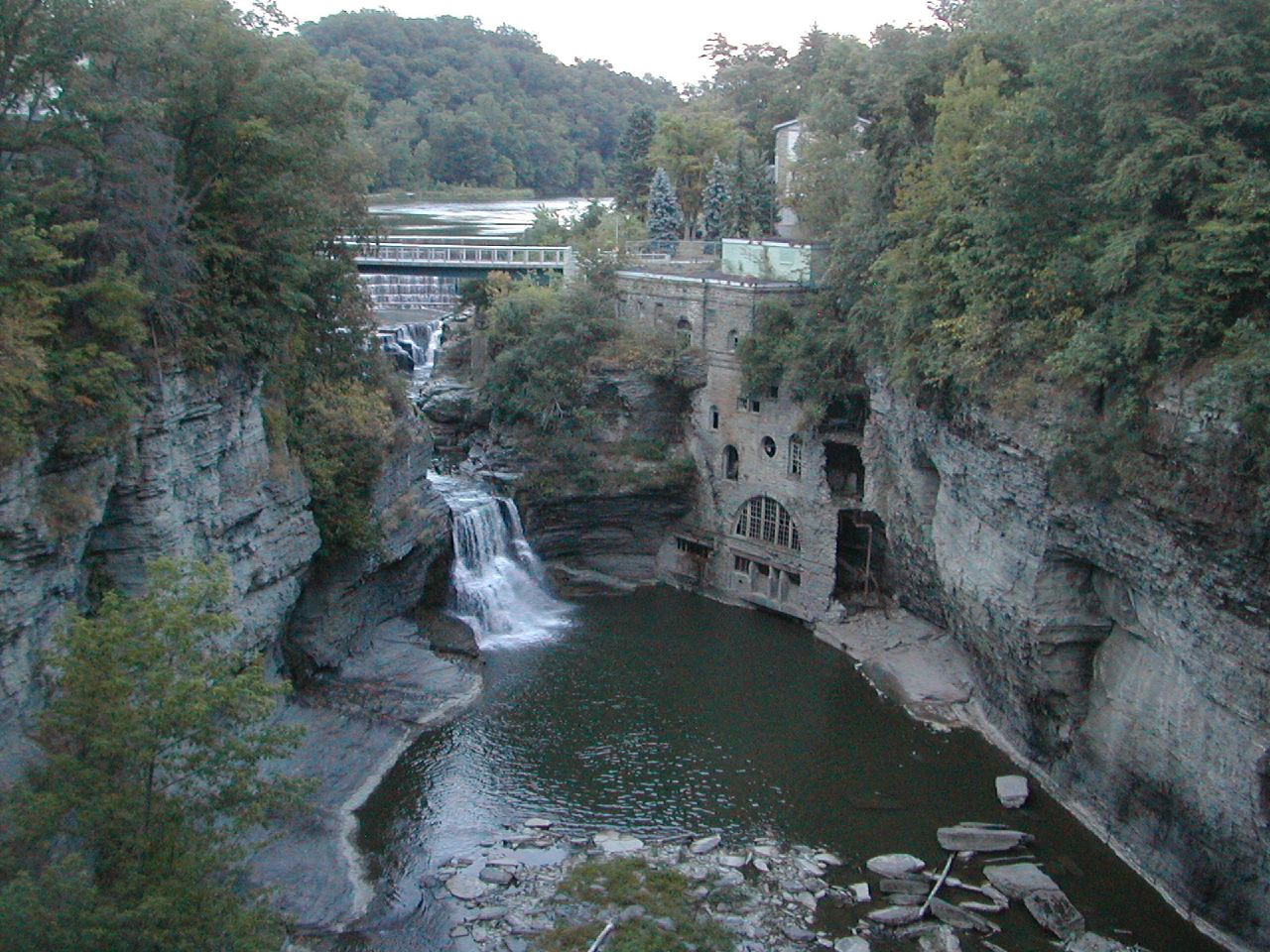
- Fall Creek Gorge below Beebe Lake

Location
- Country: United States
- State: New York

Physical characteristics
- Source
  - location: Sempronius, New York
- Mouth: Cayuga Lake
  - location: Ithaca, New York, United States
  - coordinates: 42°27′36″N 76°30′35″W
- Basin size: 128 mi^{2} (330 km^{2})

Basin features
- Tributaries
  - left: Beaver Creek, Mud Creek, Virgil Creek
  - right: Lake Como Outlet, Webster Brook, Mill Creek

Fall Creek is a river located in Tompkins County, New York. It flows into Cayuga Lake by Ithaca, New York, and is the lake's largest tributary. The creek flows through Cornell University's main campus and supplies drinking water for the university. Across the river's roughly 30 miles (48 km), it has several waterfalls along its course, most notably in its final segment, known as the Fall Creek Gorge. These include Ithaca Falls and Triphammer Falls.

In the 19th century, the river powered mills in towns along its route, including Dryden and Fall Creek. Fall Creek has also supplied power to a hydroelectric plant that serves Cornell University since the 1880s, and from 1898 to 2009 it held a hydraulic research laboratory (abandoned in the 1960s).

Fall Creek has a watershed of 126–130 square miles (330–340 km^{2}), which is primarily agricultural and forested land. Large portions of land surrounding the river are held as preservation land by the Cornell Botanic Gardens and the Finger Lakes Land Trust. The creek is used for recreational activities including hiking, swimming, kayaking and canoeing, and fishing. In 1988, its final 1.8 miles (2.9 km) were designated by New York State as a "recreational river".

== Course ==
The length of Fall Creek is roughly between 30 mi (48 km) and 33 mi (53 km).

=== Origins ===
Fall Creek originates near Lake Como, where it is fed by outflow from that lake, as well as springs fed in turn by a subterranean aquifer. From there, it flows roughly south through towns including Groton and McLean. Tributaries that join the river during this section include outflows from the McLean Bogs. The river's course then shifts roughly south-west towards Cayuga Lake. It then passes through Freeville and Etna, receiving another major tributary, Virgil Creek, which in turn drains Dryden Lake. Other tributaries in this area include Beaver Creek and Mud Creek.

Near Varna, Fall Creek enters the 550-acre (2.2 km^{2}) Monkey Run Natural Area, operated by the Cornell Botanic Gardens; it then flows through another Cornell-run preserve. As the river enters its final stretch, the land surrounding it becomes the "Fall Creek Gorge", with a vertical drop at points reaching almost 200 feet (61 m).

=== Cornell campus and Ithaca ===
Fall Creek flows through the campus of Cornell University and into Ithaca, New York, before reaching Cayuga Lake. This segment drops roughly 500 feet (150 m) and flows through a series of notable features, including a series of six waterfalls. Another feature in this area is Beebe Lake, a man-made lake. The river then goes over Flume Falls, Triphammer Falls, Rocky Falls (by the Cornell University Hydroelectric Plant), Foaming Falls, Forest Falls and Ithaca Falls. Below Ithaca Falls, Fall Creek exits the gorge and levels out as it flows through Ithaca. While in Ithaca, it flows down a man-made channel. It empties into Cayuga Lake at Stewart Park.

== Geologic history ==
The modern-day watershed area of Fall Creek is thought to be much smaller than it once was; it once included the current Tioughnioga River watershed. Land reshaping associated with periods of quaternary glaciation split the valley in two, leaving the Fall Creek and Tioughnioga watersheds distinct, a process that some geologists have termed "beheading" of the valley. There is no scholarly consensus on when this occurred, though it was likely before the Erie Interstade (roughly 18 to 22 thousand years ago).

== History ==
Prior to widespread European arrival in upstate New York, the land surrounding Ithaca, New York, was the homeland of the Cayuga people. Little is known about their history in the Fall Creek valley. An indigenous trail went through the region, roughly along the path where New York State Route 13 would later be built, and at least one site with artifacts has been excavated in the valley. That site, known as the "Plus site", was excavated by archeology faculty at Binghamton University from 1997 to 1998. They theorized that the region was relatively remote to indigenous villages and may have been used primarily for "resource procurement". The Cayuga and other indigenous people were forced off of their land during the 1779 Sullivan Expedition.

Following the end of the American Revolution, land in the area was granted to soldiers as part of the Central New York Military Tract, and settlement continued throughout the early 19th-century. Many of the communities that emerged on the banks of Fall Creek were initially mill towns, including Dryden, Forest Home, and Fall Creek (later part of Ithaca).

A mill below Ithaca Falls was built in the 1810s. In the 1820s, Ezra Cornell was hired to manage Jeremiah S. Beebe's mills on the creek. He led several construction projects, including that of a dam above Triphammer Falls, which created Beebe Lake where there had originally been a swamp, and a 200 feet (61 m) tunnel serving the mill below Ithaca Falls. An 1898 history of Dryden described the Fall Creek as providing an "abundance of mill sites for water power" in the town, and wrote that development in that section had resulted in most of the trees near the river being cut down.

From 1880 to 1987, the Ithaca Gun Company operated a factory at the base of Ithaca Falls.

=== Cornell University ===
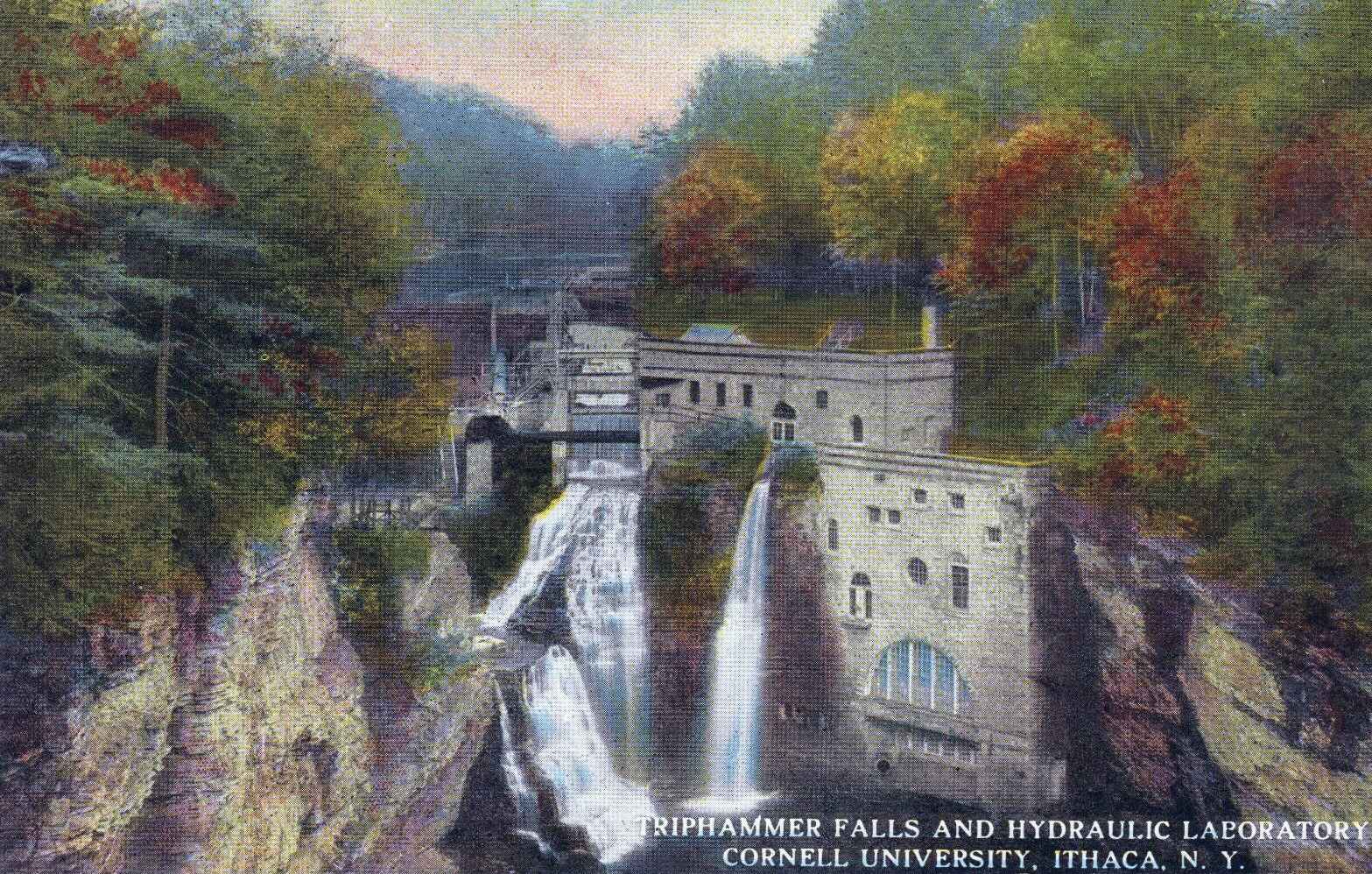
The Cornell Hydraulic Laboratory depicted in a 1911 postcard.

In 1857, Ezra Cornell purchased 300 acres (120 ha) of land bordering Fall Creek, which he initially operated as a farm. As part of the foundation of Cornell University in 1865, Ezra Cornell agreed to donate this land to the university, and its first buildings were constructed on the land. By 1875, Cornell was drawing its water from Fall Creek. A study undertaken that year by two university professors determined that the quality of the river's water was compromised because raw sewage was regularly dumped into it. Early efforts to address this were unsuccessful, and in 1902, the New York Health Commissioner, Daniel Lewis, issued regulations aimed at protecting Fall Creek's watershed.

In 1898, the University constructed a 70 feet (21 m) hydraulic research lab on the gorge wall below Beebe Lake. The lab was abandoned in the 1960s, and collapsed into the gorge in 2009. The following year, work began to remove the debris, which was later completed.

The gorge also divides Cornell's Central Campus from its residential North Campus. Two major bridges span the gorge in this area: the Thurston Avenue Bridge (opened 1898), and the Stewart Avenue Bridge (opened 1900). A pedestrian suspension bridge was opened in 1913, and replaced in an updated form in 1960. These bridges have been the site of several gorge suicides, and in response Cornell placed nets underneath them in the early 2010s.

Cornell University has generated electricity from Fall Creek since the 1880s. In 1904, the University opened a hydroelectric plant on Fall Creek, which was renovated in 1981. As of 2023, the plant was active and annually generated 4.5M to 5.5M kilowatt-hours of electricity, contributing ~3-5% of the University's total power.

=== Planned Monkey Run dam ===
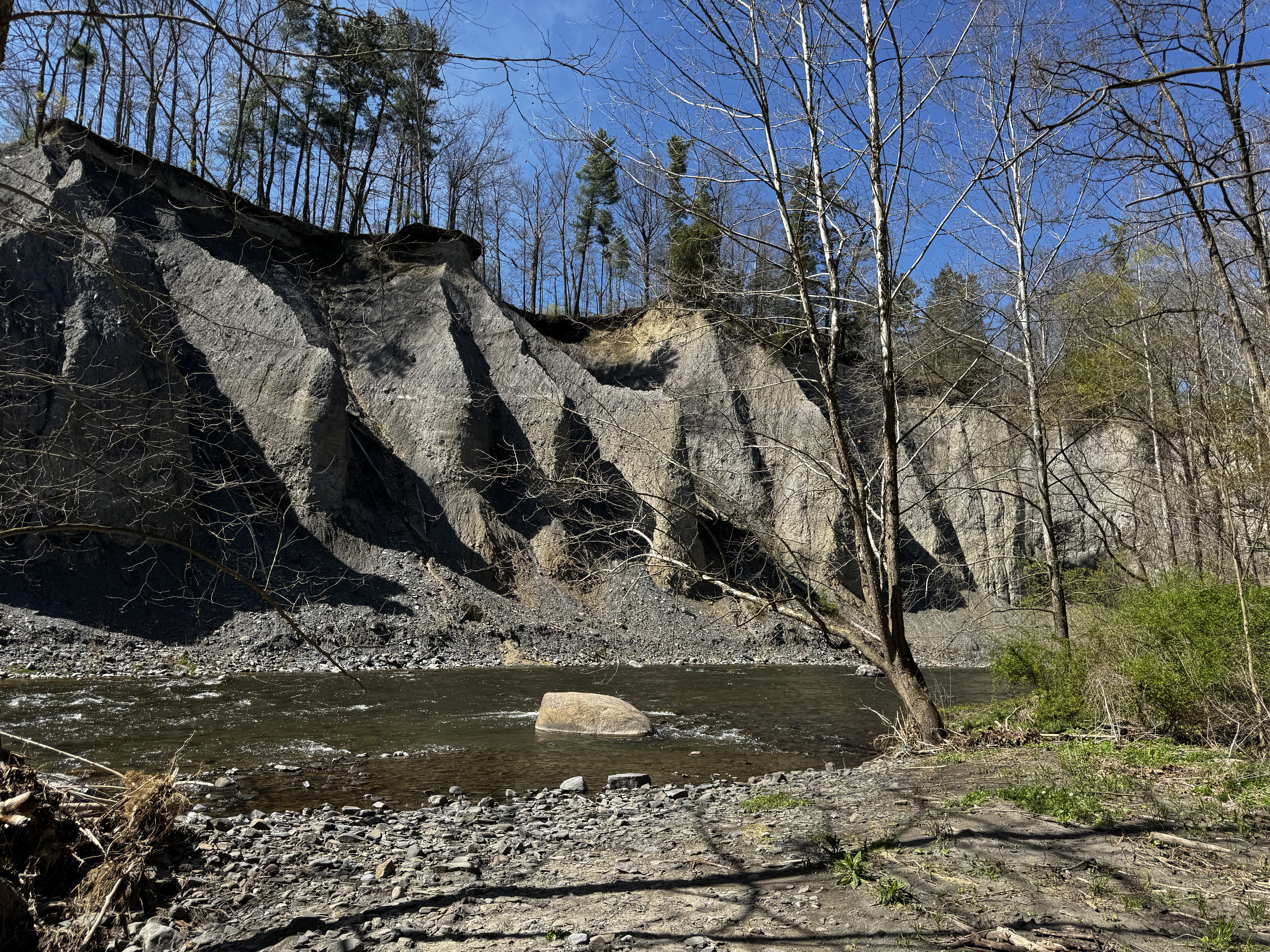
Cliffs in the Monkey Run Natural Area

In 1910, the City of Ithaca began considering construction of a water reservoir on Fall Creek, between Etna and Varna, to serve the city. The proposed reservoir would have had a capacity of around 500 million gallons. Around the same time, Cornell also investigated the possibility of constructing the same reservoir, which it hoped would stabilize the river's flow and provide increased hydroelectric capacity. It began purchasing farmland to construct this dam in 1911, and continued to do so for the next several years.

From 1912 to 1916, 125 acres (51 ha) of this land, exclusively portions higher than the planned dam, was reforested by the Cornell Department of Forestry. A 1922 report, however, determined that it would be too expensive for the University to develop substantial further hydroelectric capabilities on Fall Creek. Nevertheless, the University continued to consider constructing a dam near Varna until 1941, when, on April 26, control of the tract was given to the Cornell Botanic Gardens. This tract is now known as Monkey Run.

=== Development and preservation ===
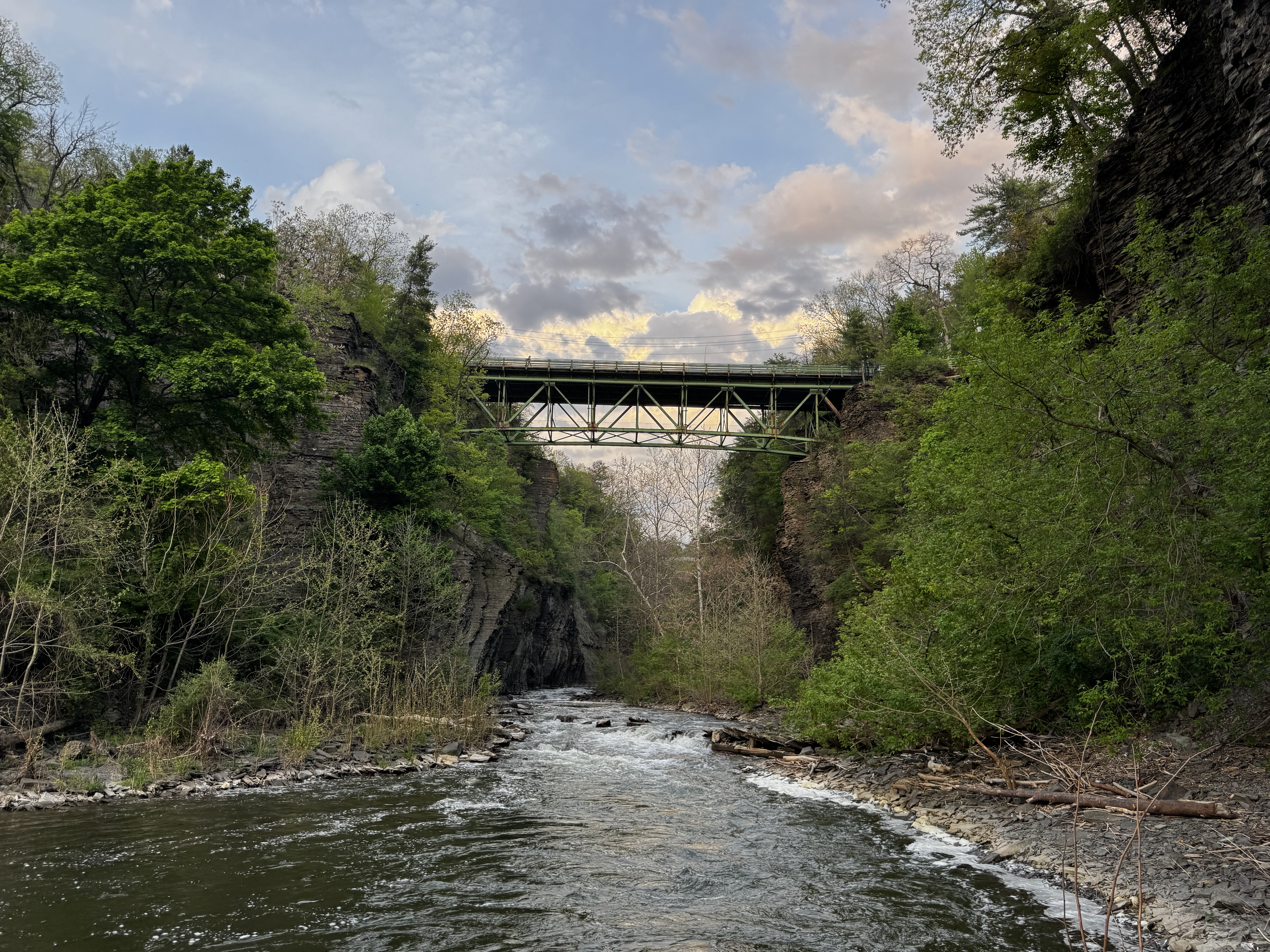
The Stewart Avenue Bridge over the Fall Creek Gorge

As Ithaca has developed, Fall Creek has periodically flooded, most notably in 1935, 1971, 1981, 1993, and 2005.

Throughout the early 1900s, Cornell University purchased substantial portions of land along Fall Creek. Its ownership of virtually all of the gorge, with the exception of Ithaca Falls, had been cemented by 1929.

In 1966, Lawrence S. Hamilton, a professor at Cornell, began campaigning for additional preservation of Fall Creek and its watershed. The following decade, researchers estimated that the Fall Creek watershed was 34% forested and 40% agricultural, with most of the remaining land deemed "abandoned agricultural land returning to forest." Most of the agricultural land was used for dairy farming. In 1974, Hamilton proposed that the land surrounding the river be named a "recreational river" by New York State, arguing that unrestricted development could degrade its water quality.

Cornell and the City of Ithaca considered plans for a second hydroelectric plant, this one at the foot of Ithaca Falls, in the 1980s. The city received a permit to construct the plant, and in 1988 voters approved its construction. However, a campaign to prevent such development successfully encouraged the City Council to pass a resolution that requested New York designate portions of the river as a "recreational river", and in 1990 the final 1.8 miles (2.9 km) of Fall Creek, from just beyond Beebe Lake to its end in Cayuga Lake, were designated as such. This designation prevented further hydropower projects.

A Superfund cleanup at the site of the Ithaca Gun Company factory in the early 21st century removed several thousand tons of lead-contaminated earth.

In the 21st century, the Finger Lakes Land Trust has purchased several tracts of land along the river for preservation. These include the 260-acre (1.1 km^{2}) Dorothy McIlroy Bird Sanctuary near Fall Creek's headwaters, established in 2002 and expanded in 2003, 2013, and 2019; the 53 acres (21 ha) Genung Nature Preserve in Freeville, acquired in 2005; the 35-acre (0.14 km^{2}) Etna Nature Preserve, established in 2011 and expanded in 2025; another 260-acre (1.1 km^{2}) purchased in 2024 that includes 10,000 feet (3,000 m) of riverfront, near the river's origins; and 26.5-acre (0.107 km^{2}) near Summerhill, including 3,400 feet (1,000 m) of Fall Creek, acquired in 2025.

== Watershed ==
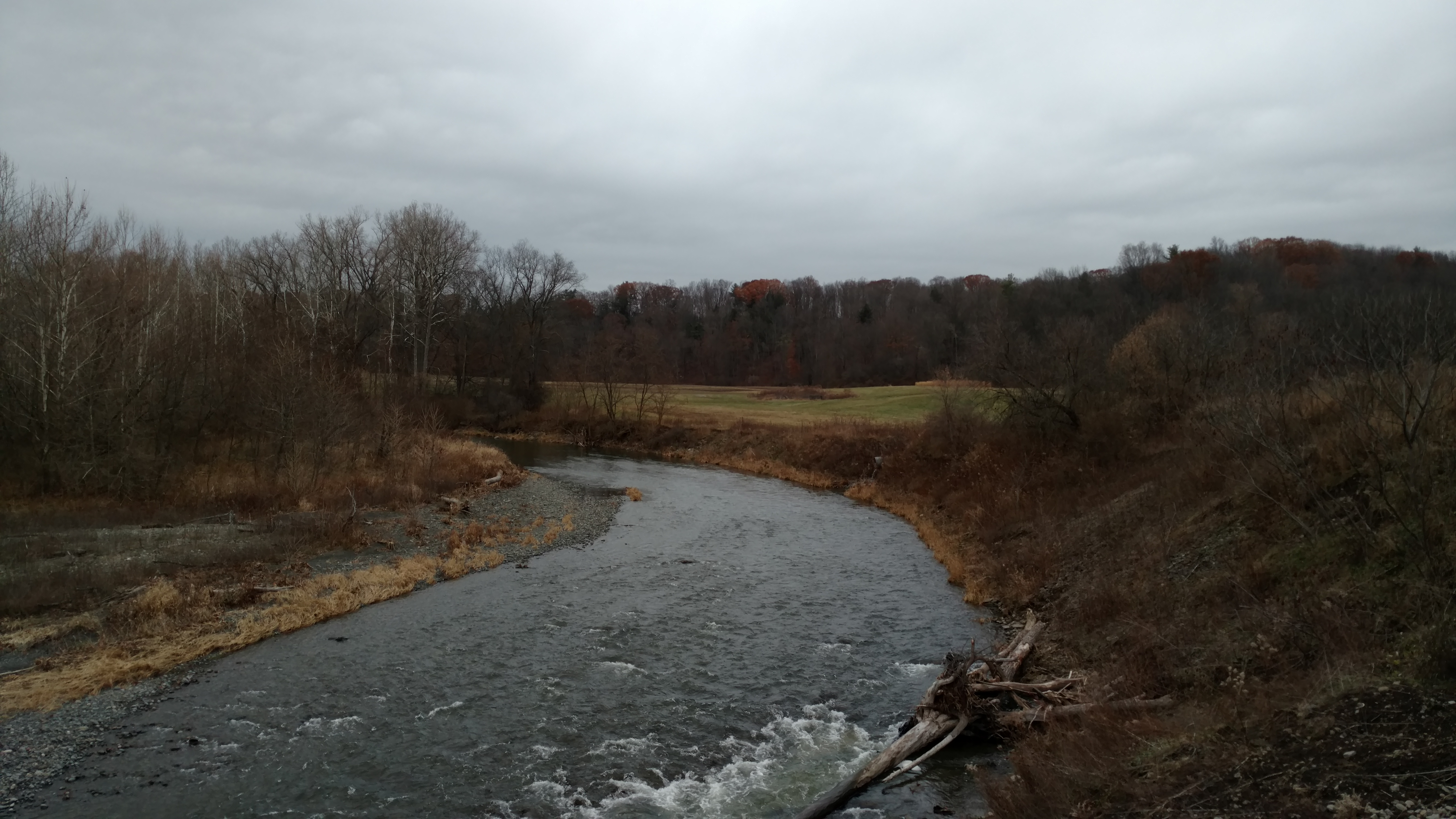
Fall Creek in Varna, New York

Fall Creek has a watershed of 126–130 square miles (330–340 km^{2}), which is the largest single section of the broader Cayuga Lake watershed. It is also the largest single tributary to the lake. As of 2019, around 22,000 people lived in the watershed. An estimated 72% of Fall Creek's water comes from runoff in its watershed.

A 2017 study reported that the watershed was roughly 50% forested and 50% agricultural land, while in 2012 researchers estimated it to be 48% agricultural, 40% forested, and 11% urban. It supplies drinking water for around 30,000 people, including all of Cornell University.

=== Water quality ===
The water quality of Fall Creek is heavily impacted by runoff from agricultural land within its watershed. Fall Creek is the largest source of phosphorus to Cayuga Lake, a nutrient that can contribute to harmful algal blooms. There are also two wastewater treatment plants on the creek. The Community Science Institute (CSI), a nonprofit organization that monitors water quality around Cayuga Lake, has taken samples of water on the creek since 2003. Their sampling has concluded that the creek has low nutrient concentrations when compared to other Cayuga Lake tributaries and the water quality is "quite good."

Academic sampling of the water in Fall Creek for quality began in the 1970s. From 1972 to 1995, over 3,500 samples were gathered from different points along the river, mostly from 1972 to 1975. These data have been used in a number of scholarly publications. Further sampling was conducted in the 21st century. Based on these samples, concentrations of soluble reactive phosphorus has remained relatively constant in the creek over decades.

=== Discharge ===
The flow of Fall Creek can vary widely year-to-year. The United States Geological Survey monitors its flow rate at a gauging station above Beebe Lake that has been run in cooperation with Cornell University since 1925. Based on this station's data, the river's median discharge is 225 cubic feet (6.4 m^{3}) per second. The average discharge in 2025 was 172.66 cubic feet (4.889 m^{3}) per second, peaking in May, with an average of 424.903 cubic feet (12.0319 m^{3}) per second, and bottoming out in September, with an average of 20.203 cubic feet (0.5721 m^{3}) per second.

The maximum daily discharge ever recorded through Fall Creek occurred on July 8, 1935, when an estimated 15,500 cubic feet (440 m^{3}) per second flowed through the river, and the minimum flow was recorded on September 6 and 7, 1999, at 2.1 cubic feet (0.059 m^{3}) per second.

View chart definition.

== Ecology ==
The forests around the Fall Creek Gorge include species of tree such as chestnut oak, red oak, black oak, white oak, shagbark hickory, pignut hickory; some of which are over 200 years old. Other trees found in the creek's valley include beeches, hemlocks, sugar maples, cucumber magnolias, tulip poplars, basswoods, and sycamores. Herbs including spring avens and Gray's sedge also grow in the valley's floodplain.

Fall Creek supports several species of fish, including brown trout, brook trout, and smallmouth bass. Its lower segment, below Ithaca Falls, is navigable to Cayuga Lake, and fish including rainbow trout, brown trout, Atlantic salmon, smallmouth bass, and lake sturgeon can be found there and use the river for spawning.

== Recreation ==
The river is a popular site for recreation along its length, including hiking, swimming, kayaking and canoeing, and fishing. The New York State Department of Environmental Conservation annually stocks portions of Fall Creek with brown trout and brook trout.
