= Beebe Lake (New York) =

Lake at Cornell University, Ithaca, New York, U.S.

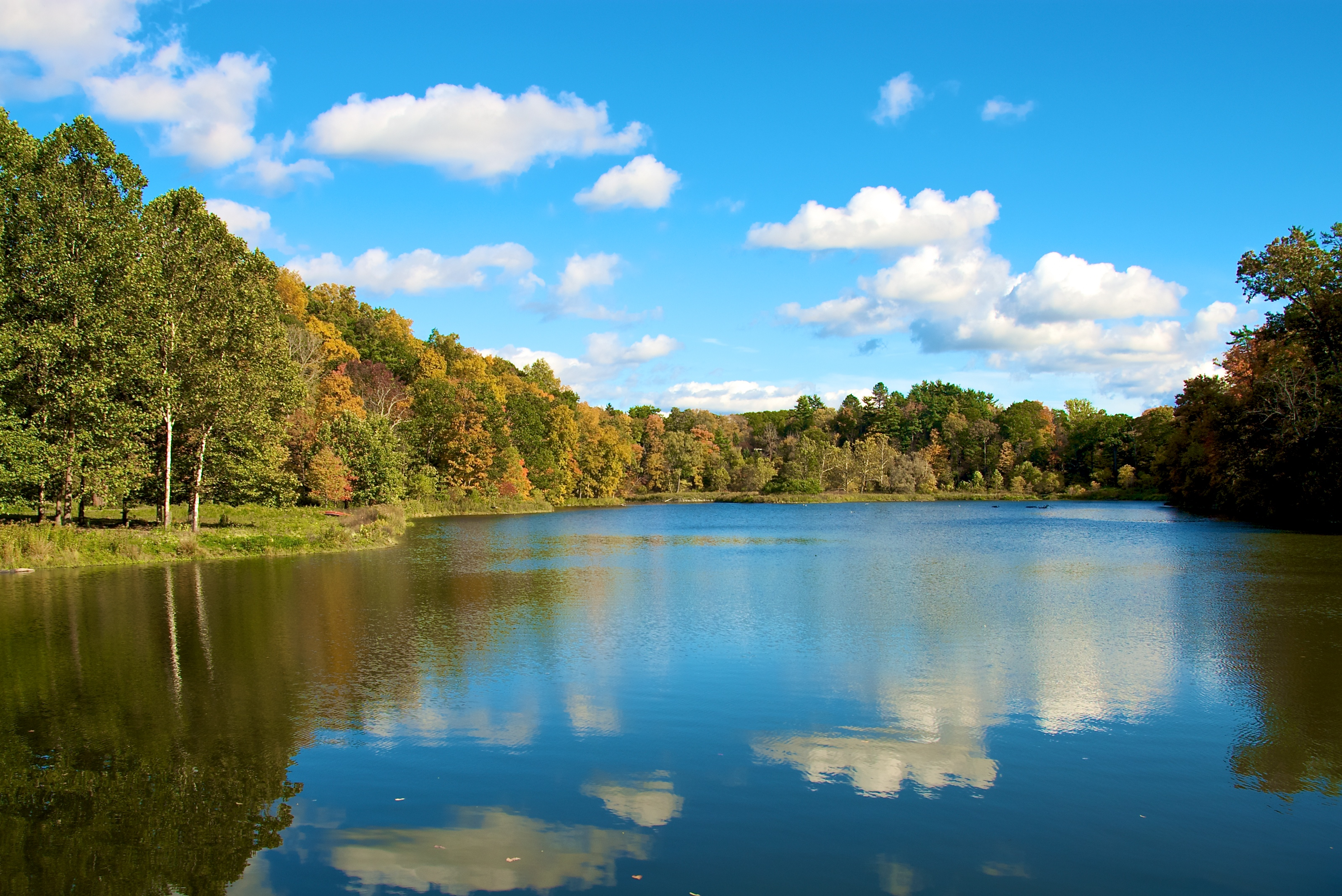

- Location within New York
- Location: Cornell University, Ithaca, New York, U.S.
- Coordinates: 42°27′04″N 76°28′35″W
- Type: Reservoir
- Built: 1838
- Construction engineer: Ezra Cornell
- Surface area: 17 acres (6.9 ha)
- Islands: 1 (Werly)

Beebe Lake /bibi/ is a reservoir in Ithaca, New York, located on the campus of Cornell University. The shallow lake impounds Fall Creek; it has a surface area of roughly 17 acres (6.9 ha) and contains roughly 53 million gallons of water. Most of the land surrounding the lake is a forested preserve managed by the Cornell Botanic Gardens, including one man-made island.

Beebe Lake was initially created in 1838 by the damming of Fall Creek and enlarged in 1898. It has been dredged several times, notably in 1988 and 2000. Throughout the early 20th-century, the lake was a popular site of winter recreation activities, including ice skating and toboggan slide rides. Beebe Lake also hosted games of the Cornell Big Red men's ice hockey team in their early years.

In the first half of the 20th century, the east end of Beebe Lake was a popular site for swimming; however, the swimming hole was closed in 1969 and swimming remains prohibited. The trails around the lake are used for hiking, jogging, and walking; the lake itself is the site of canoeing and kayaking. Water from Beebe Lake also supplies Cornell's hydroelectric plant.

== Geography ==
Beebe Lake is part of Fall Creek, which emerges from the Hemlock Gorge above the lake, and flows over Triphammer Falls into the Fall Creek Gorge below.

Beebe Lake has a surface area of roughly 17 acres (6.9 ha), most of which is around 6–10 inches (150–250 mm) deep. It holds roughly 53 million gallons of water. Most of the land surrounding it is forested and managed by the Cornell Botanic Gardens. Trails through these woods circle the lake. On the west end of the lake is Cornell's welcome center. It is crossed to the east by Sackett Bridge, a stone footbridge roughly 35 feet (11 m) above the water.

The reservoir's one island, Werly Island, was constructed as part of a 1980s restoration project.

== History ==
=== Formation ===
Beebe Lake was once a forested swamp. A pond was formed when Ezra Cornell constructed a dam on Fall Creek in 1838, above Triphammer Falls, to provide power to the mills owned by Jeremiah S. Beebe. Cornell constructed a tunnel 200 feet long and 15 feet high to channel the water, raising the water level 18 feet. In 1898, the dam was raised an additional ten feet, turning the pond into a proper lake.

=== Winter recreation ===
History

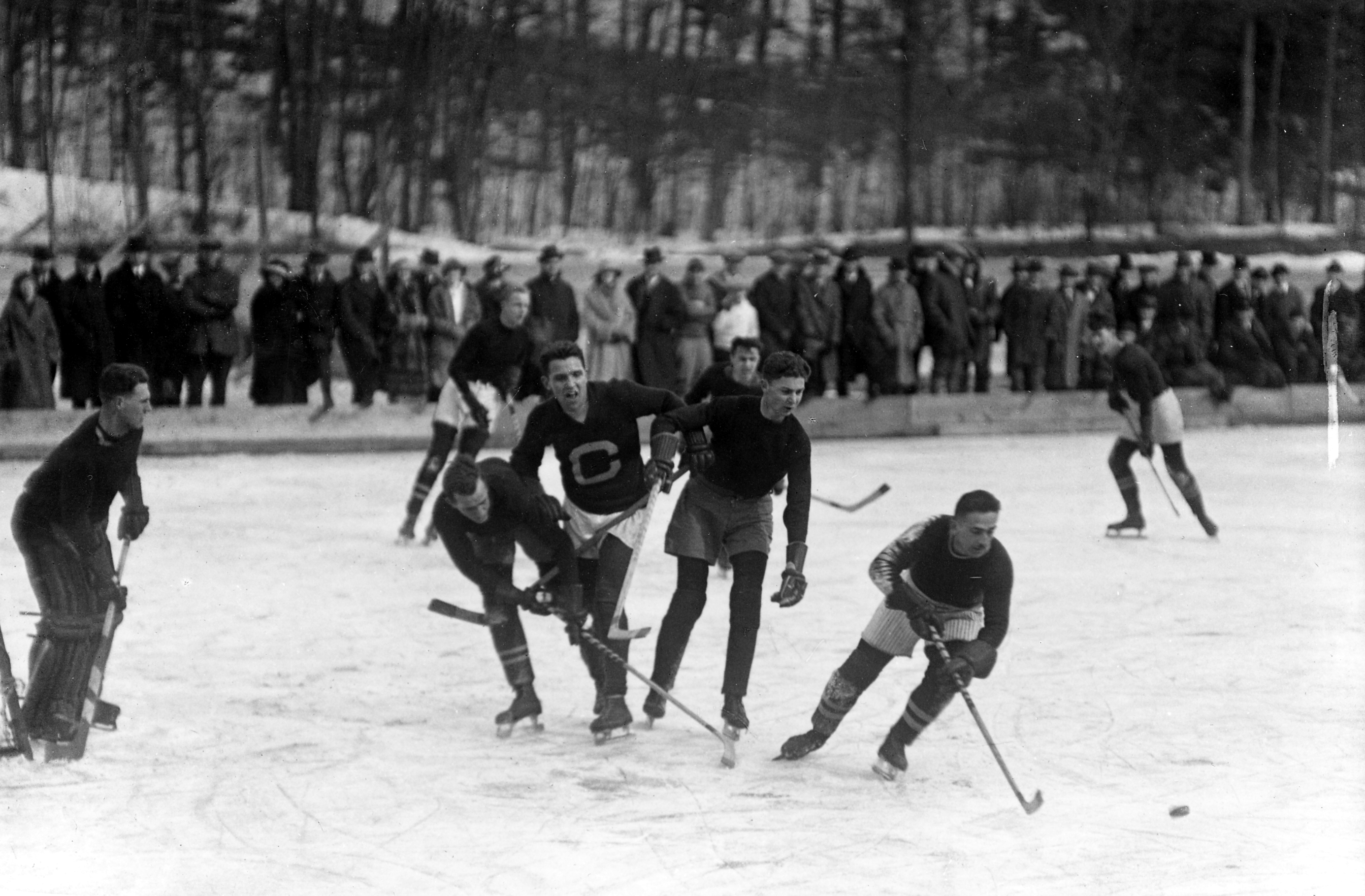
1922 hockey game

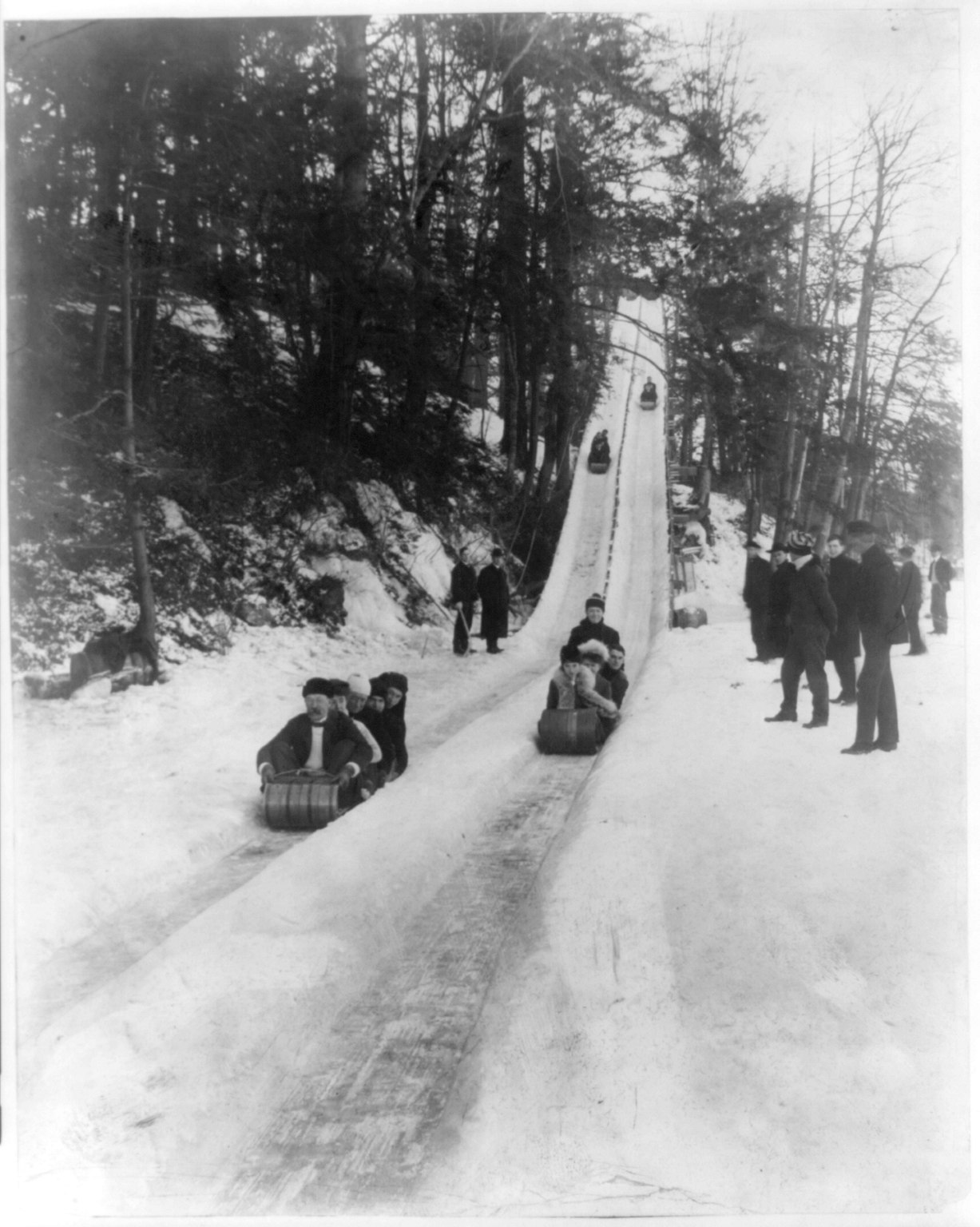
Toboggan slide

Beebe Lake became a major local destination for winter recreation starting in the 1890s. The space was maintained by the Cornell Athletic Association but open to the public for ice skating. Ithaca Street Railway trolleys would announce that the ice was open for skating by displaying a white banner with red ball. Trolley passengers with skates rode for half price. In the Spring when the ice melted, sometimes local children would break of chunks of ice with poles, and ride the ice rafts downstream.

A toboggan slide was a popular attraction on Beebe Lake for the first half of the 20th Century. The first one was erected around 1900 and made of wood; it was replaced by a steel slide in the 1920s. Although dangerous and costly to operate, it remained enormously popular, until Cornell removed the slide in 1949.

In the early 20th century, Cornell fraternities held ice castle building competitions, creating intricate structures with decorated pillars.

The lake was also Cornell's primary venue for ice hockey matches during the first decades of the sport. However, the ice would sometimes melt just before a scheduled contest, making it an unreliable venue. In 1957 Lynah Rink was constructed, freeing the hockey team from the unpredictability of the climate.

=== Development ===
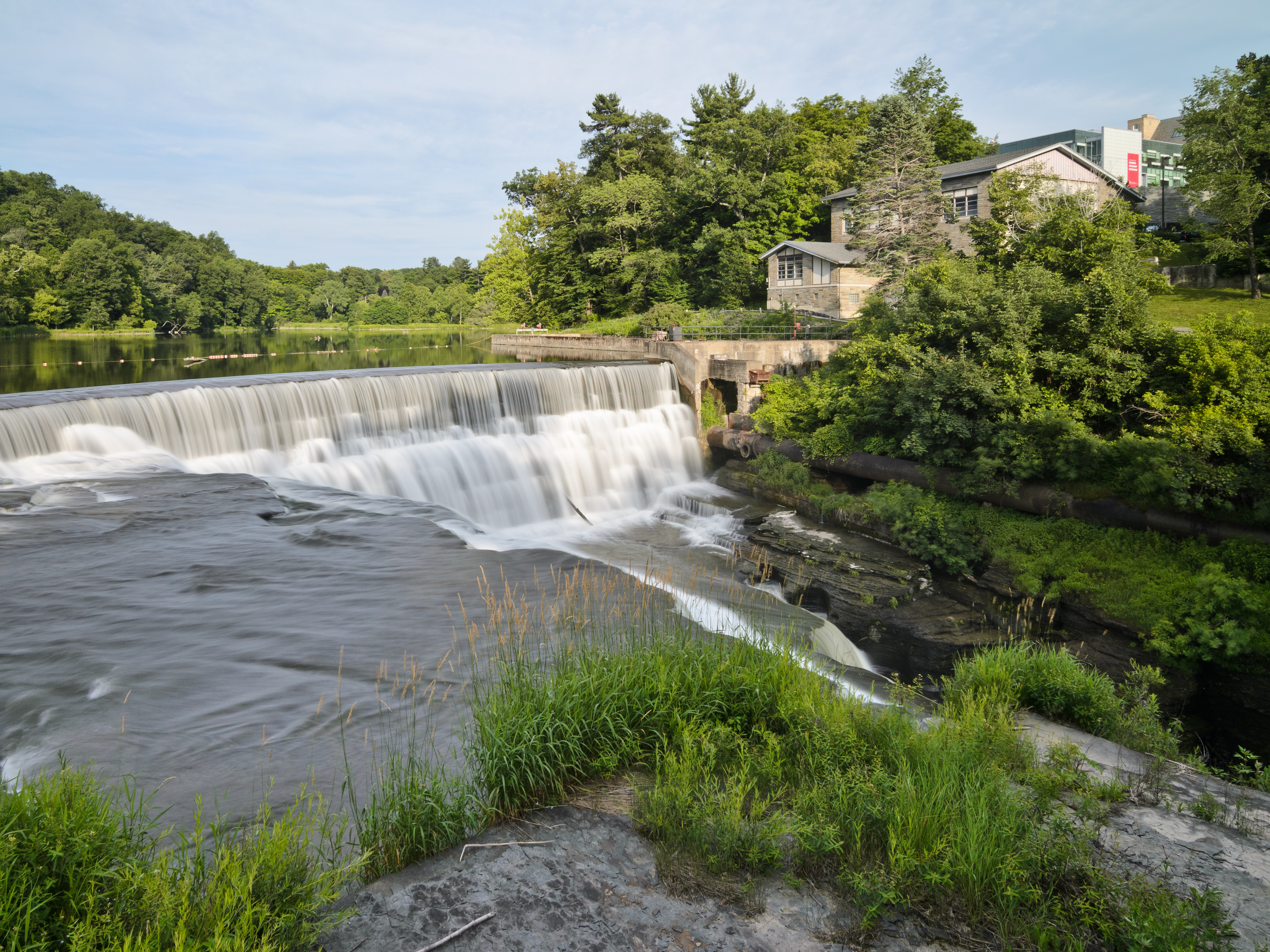
The Beebe Lake dam above Triphammer Falls and the Weinhold Chilled Water Plant (right), in 2015.

The dam itself was substantially rebuilt in 1951.

In 1963, a chilled water plant opened on the shores of Beebe Lake. The plant, a water source cooling system that served to Cornell's campus using the lake as a heat sink, was expanded two years later. In 1969 the plant was renamed after Julius F. Weinhold. A 1989 upgrade added free cooling capabilities. This plant was later deactivated and replaced by a lake-source cooling plant using water from Cayuga Lake around 2000.

The lake is dredged approximately once a decade in order to prevent it from returning to its original wetland state. Substantial such projects took place in 1988 and 2000. In recent decades, the lake remains a popular spot for paddling by organizations such as the Cornell Outing Club.

Beebe Lake provides water to Cornell's hydroelectric power plant.

== Recreation ==
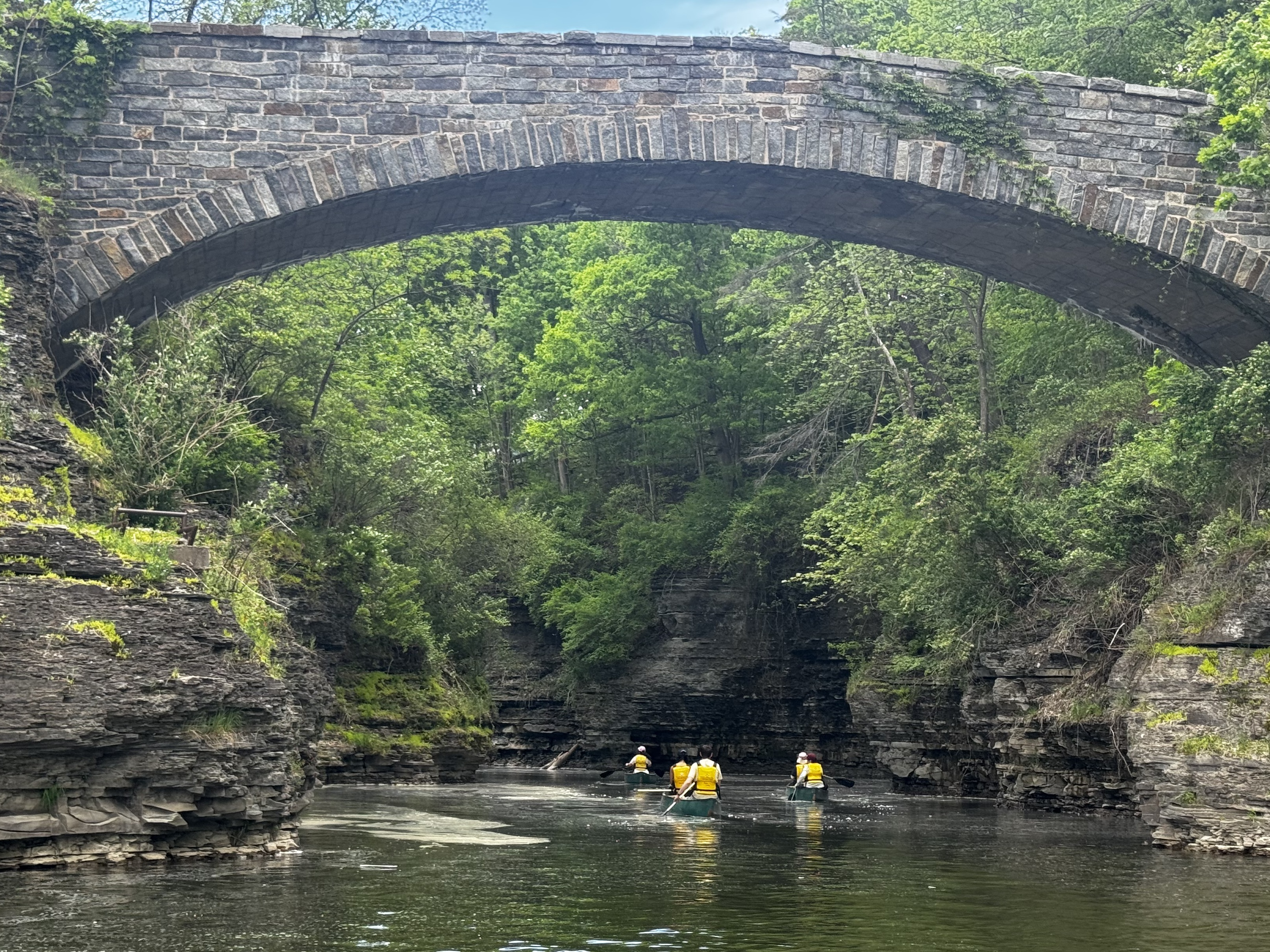
Canoeing on the east end of Beebe Lake below the Sackett Bridge

The trails surrounding Beebe Lake are used for running, walking, and hiking. Although fishing is generally prohibited, some university physical education fishing courses make use of the lake. Beebe Lake is also used for canoeing and kayaking.

In the 19th-century, the east end of the lake was a popular swimming hole, equipped with diving boards. As late as the 1960s, swimming was officially sanctioned and supervised by the university—in the summer of 1969, for instance, the area was open from 1 pm to 8:30 pm. By 1970, however, swimming was banned. The city health commissioner attributed this to the creek carrying increased amounts of eroded material, which rendered visibility through the water poor to the point that swimmers in need of rescue could not be adequately seen. Swimming at the lake has remained prohibited for the subsequent decades.
