= Lake Como (disambiguation) =

Lake Como is a lake of glacial origin in Lombardy, Italy.

Lake Como may also refer to:

== Lakes ==
United States

- Lake Como (Minnesota), a lake in Saint Paul, Minnesota
- Lake Como (New York), a lake in Cayuga County, New York
- Lake Como (Montana), a lake in Ravalli County's Bitterroot Valley
- Lake Como (Colorado), a lake in San Juan County, Colorado

== Places ==
United States

- Lake Como, Florida, unincorporated community
- Lake Como, Mississippi, unincorporated community
- Lake Como, New Jersey, borough
- Lake Como, Pennsylvania, unincorporated community
- Lake Como, Wisconsin, unincorporated community

== Other uses ==
- Lake Como (painting), an 1825 painting by Clarkson Stanfield

== See also ==
- Como Lake (disambiguation)
