= Beth Soll =

American dancer

- Occupation: Dancer
- Dancing career
- Current group: Dance Projects, Inc./Beth Soll & Company
- Dances: Modern

Beth Soll is an American dancer. She began training with Romanian modern dancers Iris Barbura and Vergiu Cornea and then continued studying in the European tradition at Essen Volkwangschule, and at the Kreutzbergschule in Switzerland. She received a degree in modern dance from the University of Wisconsin and a Ph.D. in the History and Theory of Modern Dance from Boston Univeristy.

During her long career, she has taught at University of Wisconsin, the Boston Conservatory, Boston University, UC Santa Barbara, Hofstra University, the New School, Manhattanville College, and the Havard Summer Dance Program, where she performed and taught for 17 years. In addition, she directed the Dance Program at MIT for 20 years.

She has performed with many dance companies in America and has collaborated with several independent choreographers including Bill Evans, Ze’eva Cohen, Martha Gray, Rosalind Newman, Wendy Perron and Mel Wong.

In 1979 she founded her own company called Dance Projects, Inc./Beth Soll & Company in Boston, Massachusetts. The company remained in Boston until it moved to New York City in 2000. The company has presented the work of choreographers such as Bill Evans, Fiona Marcotty, Wendy Perron and Pamela Raff. Beth Soll has also collaborated with various composers such as Robert Aldridge, Richard Cornell, John Funkhouser and Dennis Miller. She has also collaborated with artists such as Ed Andrews, Liese Bronfenbrenner, Mira Cantor, Katherine Finkelpearl and Nancy Hotchkiss. The company has presented a new work each year since 2001 including most recently Lament, Kvetch… and Romp!(2009) and Restless Geometry (2010). Much of her work focuses on coded gestures that depict a personal narrative, without explicit references. Beth Soll has received many Choreography Fellowships and Dance Company Grants from the National Endowment for the Arts for work with her company. In 1993 she won an Eliot Norton Award for her work as a dancer, choreographer and teacher. Beth Soll & Company website: bethsoll.org
