= Iris Barbura =

Romanian Expressionist dancer

Iris Barbura (November 4, 1912, in Arad, Austria-Hungary – June 13, 1969, in Ithaca, New York) was a Romanian-German-American dancer, choreographer, and dance teacher.

== Life and work ==
Barbura began her dance studies in 1931 at the National University of Music Bucharest. In 1935, she met pianist (and later conductor) Sergiu Celibidache. They had a multi-year romantic and artistic partnership. Celebidache accompanied Barbura on the piano, and also composed music that she used in her performances. From 1936 to 1938, Barbura spent summers studying dance in Vienna, Dresden, at the Mozarteum in Salzburg with Harald Kreutzberg, and in Berlin.

Between 1938 and 1942, Barbura worked in Bucharest as a choreographer and performed solo programs. She practiced modern dance, more specifically Expressionist dance, and was the first choreographer at the National Theatre. In 1942 she embarked on an international performance tour to Germany. From 1945 to 1951, she lived with Celibidache in Berlin and gave solo dance recitals. Vergiu Cornea was sometimes her dance partner. Barbura and Celibidache separated in 1951, and she emigrated to the US, where she lived in Ithaca, New York. There she opened her own dance studio at 420 Eddy St.

== Death ==
In June 1969, she leapt to her death from a bridge over Triphammer Falls. She was 56 years old.

== Legacy ==
In 2016, her most famous student, Beth Soll, performed a solo work in her honor.

In 2017, she was the subject of the biography Iris Barbura: don't think — dance, dance, dance! by Alexandru Mușat.

== Bibliography ==
- Kern, Agnes; et al. (2017). Tribute to Iris Barbura. Berlin: Centrul Național al Dansului București and Deutsches Tanzarchiv Köln. ISBN 978-973-0-24013-9.
- Mușat, Alexandru (2017). Iris Barbura: don't think — dance, dance, dance!. Bucharest: Editura Enciclopedică. ISBN 978-973-45-0736-8.
