= Como Lake (disambiguation) =

Como Lake is a glacial lake in Lombardy, Italy.

Como Lake may also refer to:

== Places ==
Canada

- Como Lake (British Columbia), a small lake
- Como Lake Middle School, in Coquitlam, British Columbia

United States

- Como Lake (Minnesota), a lake
- Como Lake Park, a county park near Buffalo, New York

== See also ==
- Lake Como (disambiguation)
