= Triphammer Falls =

Coordinates: 42.4518°N 76.4798°W

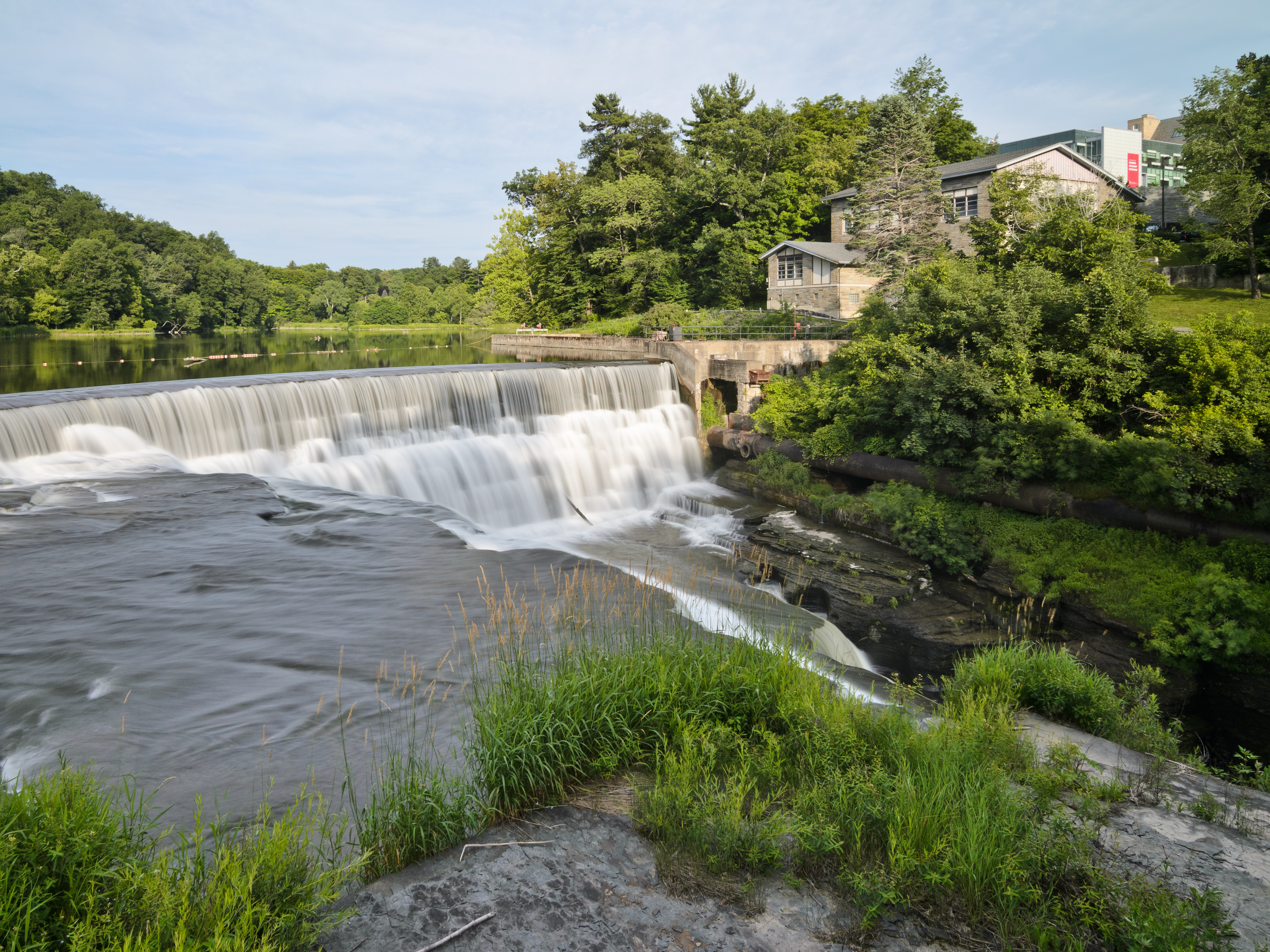
- Interactive map of Triphammer Falls
- Location: Ithaca, New York

Triphammer Falls is a 55-foot (17 m) waterfall on Fall Creek in Ithaca, New York, located within the campus of Cornell University. The waterfall existed naturally but was altered substantially in order to construct a dam in the 19th century, leading to the formation of Beebe Lake. The dam is capable of regulating the water flow between 12–4,700 cubic feet (0.34–133.09 m^{3}) per second. In 1997, a pedestrian bridge was built over Triphammer Falls to connect Central and North Campus.

== Gallery ==
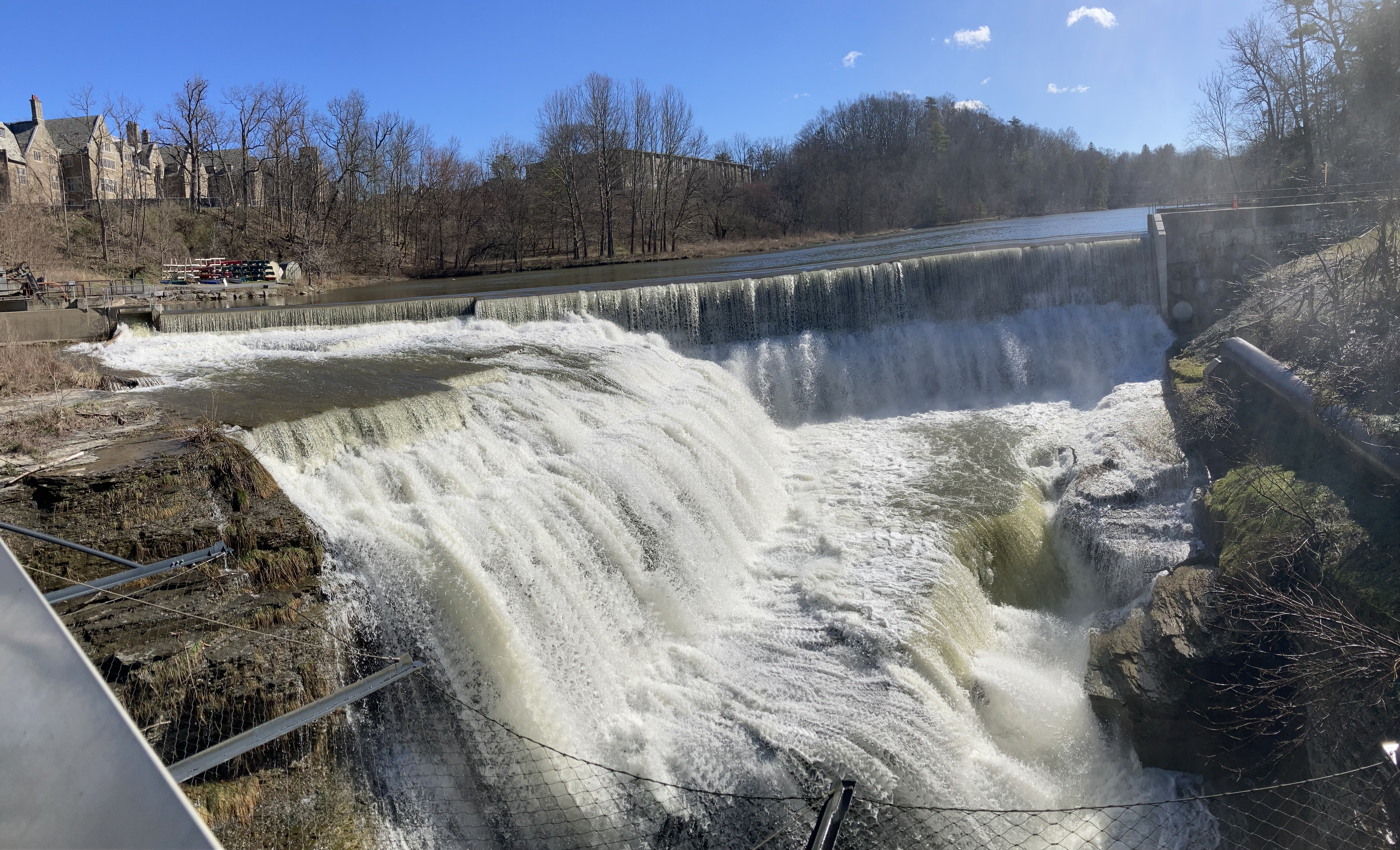
Triphammer Falls in April.

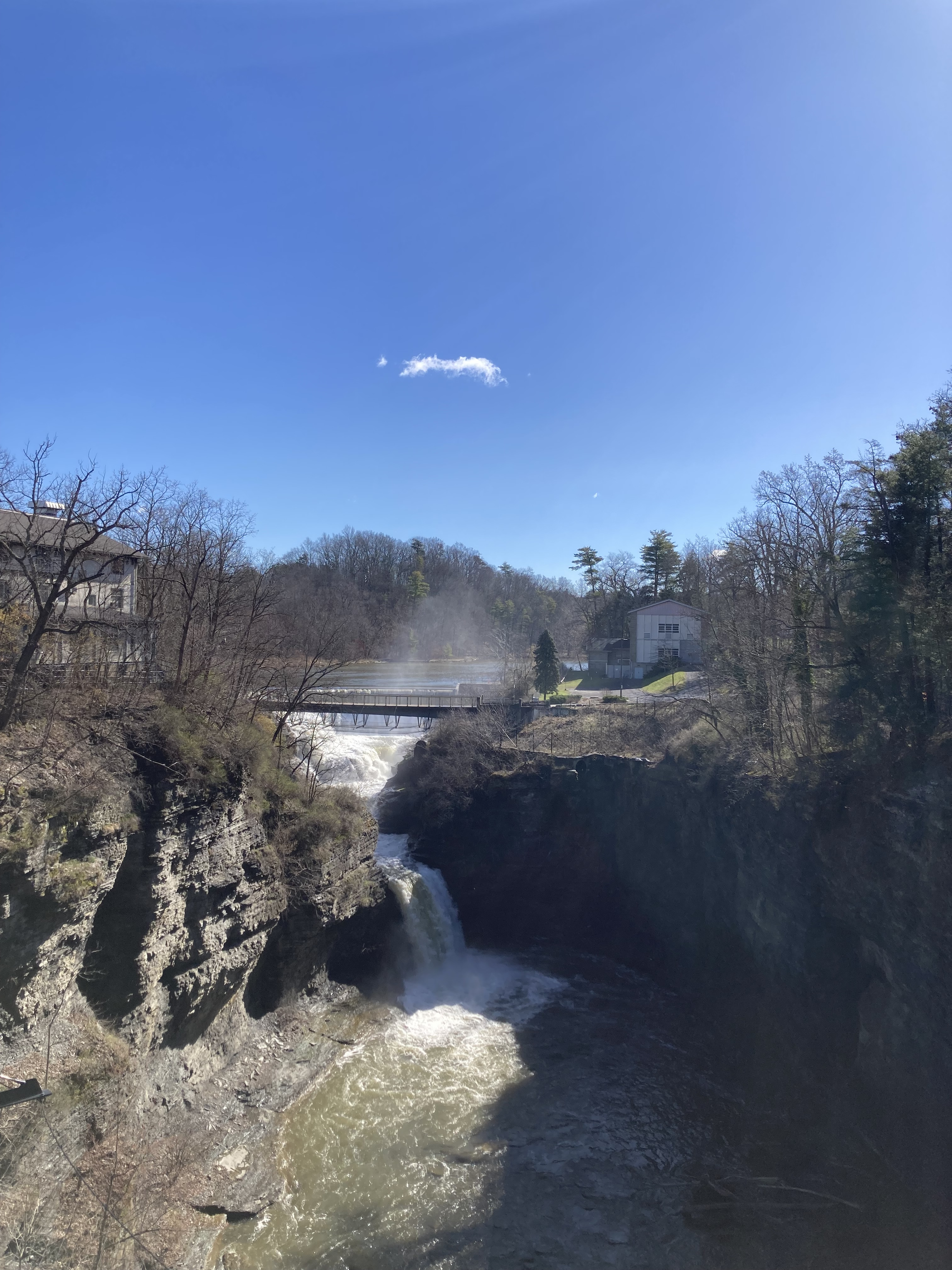
A view of the falls from the road bridge.

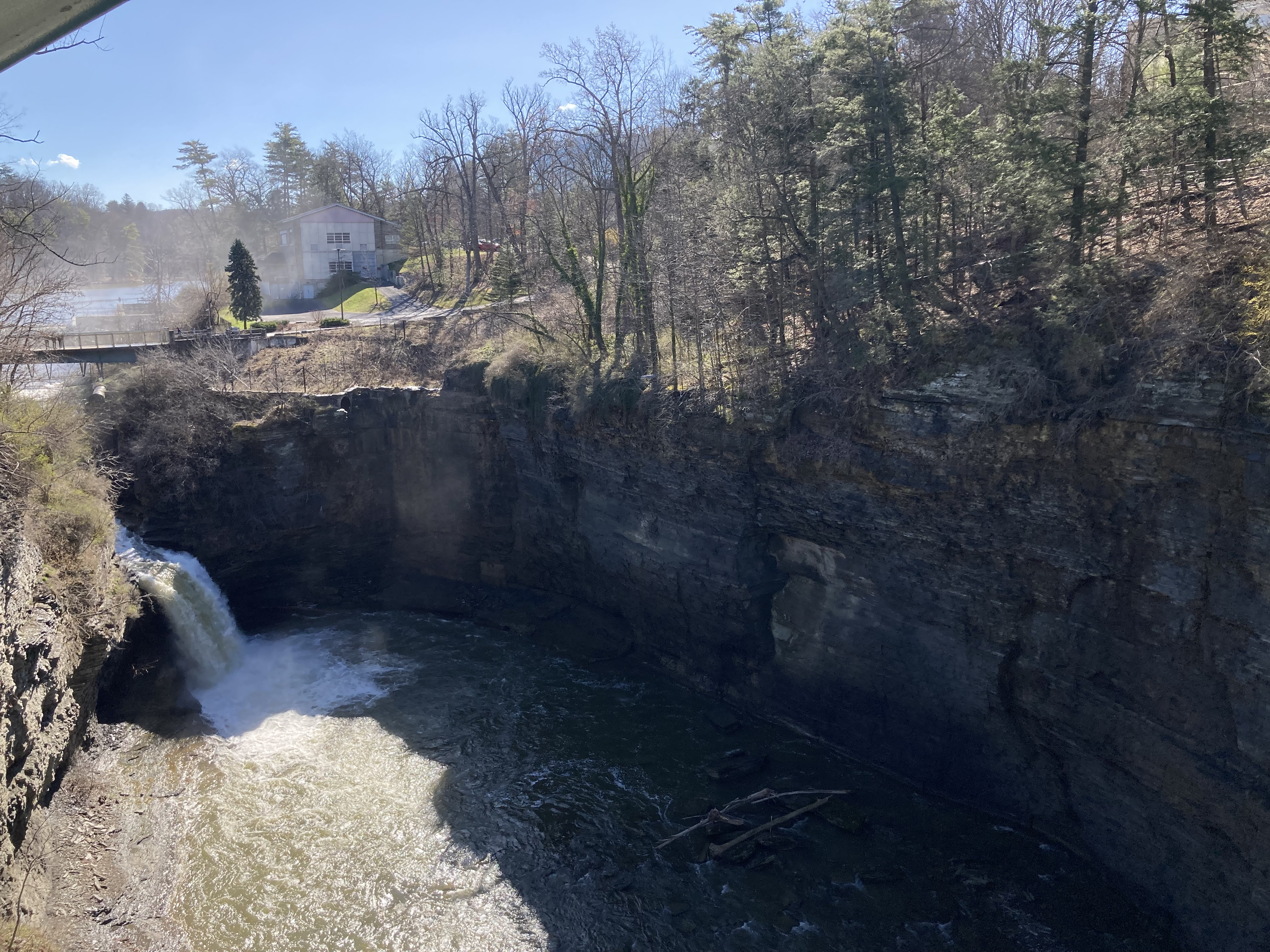
A view of the falls and gorge from the road bridge

== See also ==
- Iris Barbura (1912–1969), Romanian dancer who leapt here to her death
- List of waterfalls
