= Mill Creek (Fall Creek tributary) =

Location
- Country: United States
- State: New York

Physical characteristics
- Mouth: Fall Creek
  - location: Freeville, New York, United States
  - coordinates: 42°30′25″N 76°21′50″W
- Basin size: 7.67 mi^{2} (19.9 km^{2})

Mill Creek is a river located in Tompkins County, New York. It flows into Fall Creek by Freeville, New York.
