= Ithaca Falls =

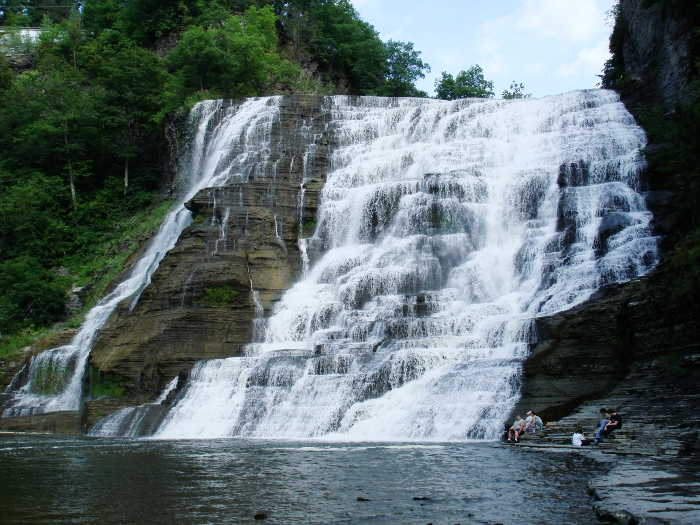
- Ithaca Falls in August 2007
- Interactive map of Ithaca Falls
- Coordinates: 42°27′10″N 76°29′30″W
- Total height: 150 feet (46 m)
- Number of drops: 1
- Total width: 175 feet (53 m)
- Watercourse: Fall Creek

Ithaca Falls

Ithaca Falls is a waterfall located within the city of Ithaca, New York. It is the last of a series of waterfalls along the hanging valley formed where Fall Creek intersects the glacial trough of Cayuga Lake. The falls are in an amphitheater formed by freezing and thawing of the weak shale which makes up most of the gorge walls. The splash pool, and the creek just below the falls, are a popular spot for fly fishing. It has a height of 150 feet (46 m) and a width 175 feet (53 m)

The area around the base of the falls was owned by Cornell University for many years, before being sold to the City of Ithaca in 2000 as a part of environmental cleanup. The area has been a popular, if dilapidated, park for many years; in 2015 it was scheduled to undergo a major redesign and rebuild. In June 2016, the Ithaca Common Council voted to demolish a house directly north of the falls and add the parcel to the park. The city had acquired the house after the owner failed to pay property taxes.

The falls is present as the stylized "I" in the official "Ithaca is Gorges" logo.

== History ==
In the early 1800s, local entrepreneurs realized the economic potential of the water power provided by Fall Creek. In 1830, a young Ezra Cornell blasted a tunnel through the gorge wall just above Ithaca Falls, and built a small diversion dam to divert water to run a complex of mills next to the falls. "The powerful flow of diverted water through the millrace channel around Ithaca Falls made possible the close location of mills one above another on the southern bank of Fall Creek. ... grist, plaster, oil, and woolen mills, and iron foundries were all established there. The mills processed local and imported raw materials, producing enough not only for local needs but for shipment outside the region."

The industry around the falls resulted in rapid development in the area; for a time, "Fall Creek Village" was considered a separate town from the rest of Ithaca. The diversion dam above the falls remained until succumbing to natural forces sometime prior to April of 2007, when it broke where it met the north gorge wall; around the base of the falls, many ruins from the former mills still exist.

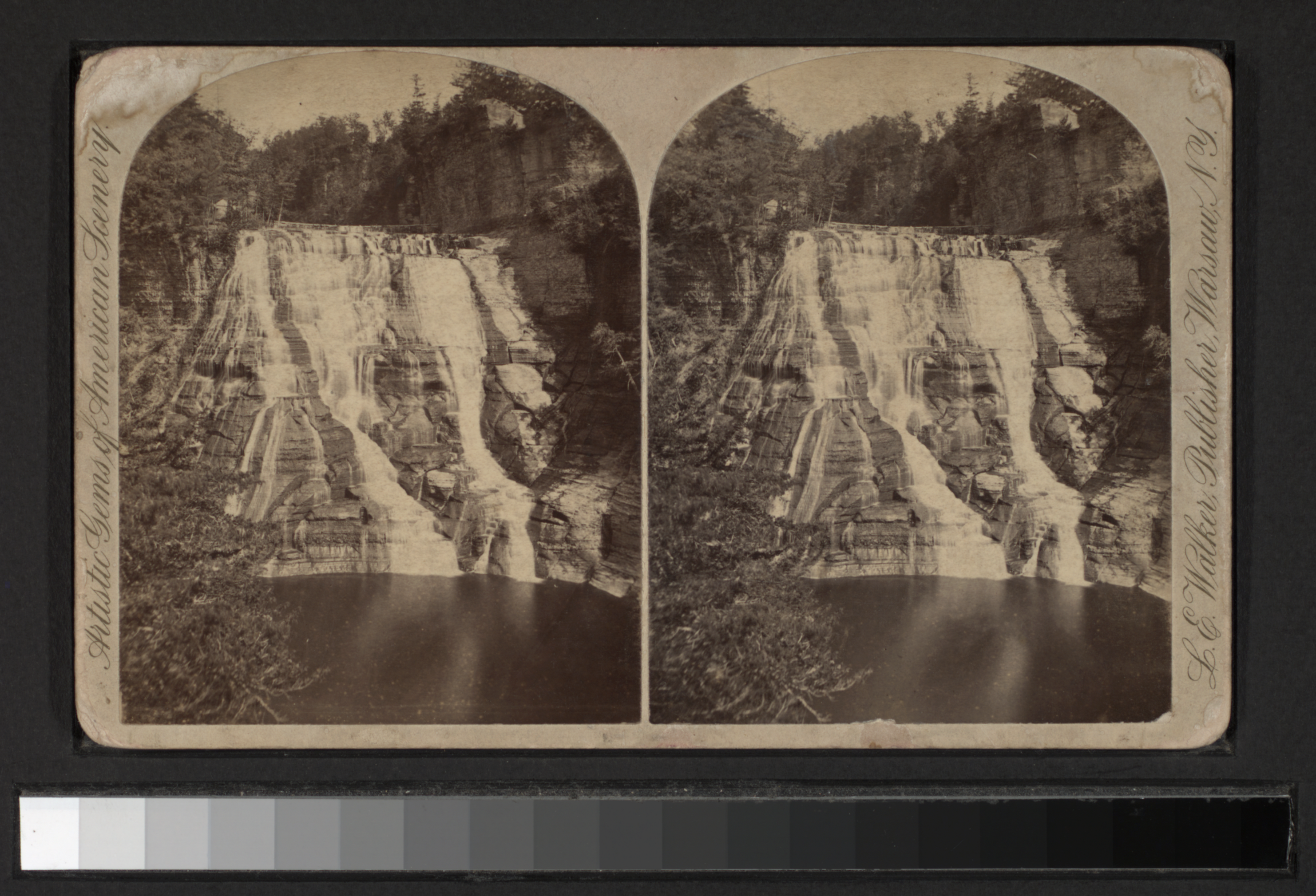
Stereoscopic view of the falls

From 1880 until its closure in 1987, the Ithaca Gun Company's factory was just south of the falls. In the late 1990s, environmental testing revealed that much of the soil nearby was contaminated by lead from shotgun tests. A major lead clean-up effort sponsored by the United States Superfund and the EPA took place from 2002 to 2004, with some additional soil removal in 2015. The building was demolished in 2009, and in 2022 plans for luxury apartments on the site were announced.

== See also ==
- List of waterfalls
