= Beaver Creek (Tompkins County, New York) =

Location
- Country: United States
- State: New York

Physical characteristics
- Mouth: Fall Creek
  - location: Malloryville, New York, United States
  - coordinates: 42°32′37″N 76°17′33″W
- Basin size: 9.29 mi^{2} (24.1 km^{2})

Beaver Creek is a river located in Tompkins County, New York. It flows into Fall Creek by Malloryville, New York.
