= Mud Creek (New York) =

Location
- Country: United States
- State: New York

Physical characteristics
- Mouth: Fall Creek
  - location: Freeville, New York, United States
  - coordinates: 42°30′58″N 76°19′49″W
- Basin size: 2.48 mi^{2} (6.4 km^{2})

Mud Creek is a river located in Tompkins County, New York. It flows into Fall Creek by Freeville, New York.
