= Webster Brook =

Location
- Country: United States
- State: New York

Physical characteristics
- Mouth: Fall Creek
  - location: Lafayette Corners, New York, United States
  - coordinates: 42°35′51″N 76°17′05″W
- Basin size: 8.94 sq mi (23.2 km^{2})

Webster Brook is a river located in Tompkins County, New York. It flows into Fall Creek by Lafayette Corners, New York.
