= Summerhill, New York =

- Town
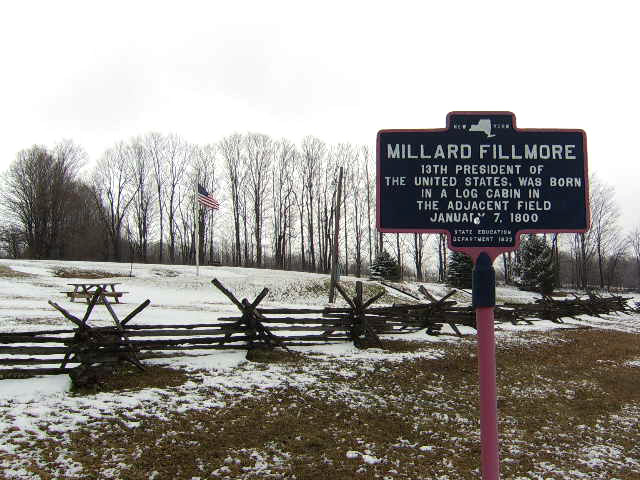
- Millard Fillmore's birthplace

- Location within Cayuga County and New York

- Location within New York Location within the United States
- Coordinates: 42°39′21″N 76°18′27″W
- Country: United States
- State: New York
- County: Cayuga

Government
  - Type: Town Council
  - Town Supervisor: Charles Ripley (R)
  - Town Council: Members' List: • Christopher L. Ryan (R); • Michael R. Passalugo (R); • Michael J. Bidwell (R); • Daniel P. Ripley (R)

Area
  - Total: 25.98 sq mi (67.30 km^{2})
  - Land: 25.86 sq mi (66.98 km^{2})
  - Water: 0.12 sq mi (0.32 km^{2})
- Elevation: 1,660 ft (506 m)

Population (2010)
  - Total: 1,217
  - Estimate (2016): 1,168
  - Density: 45.2/sq mi (17.44/km^{2})
- Time zone: UTC-5 (Eastern (EST))
  - Summer (DST): UTC-4 (EDT)
- ZIP Codes: 13045 (Cortland); 13092 (Locke); 13118 (Moravia); 13073 (Groton)
- FIPS code: 36-011-72037
- GNIS feature ID: 0979536
- Website: Town website

Summerhill is a town in Cayuga County, New York, United States. The population was 1,217 at the 2010 census. The town name is that of a location in Ireland. Summerhill is in the southeastern corner of the county and is northeast of Ithaca.

== History ==
Prior to the American Revolution, this area was part of the territory of the Onondaga people. Afterwards, Summerhill was part of the Central New York Military Tract, land reserved for veterans. The first settler arrived circa 1797.

The town was founded as the town of Plato in 1831 from the town of Locke, but the name was changed to "Summerhill" in 1832 to avoid conflict with the name of another location.

Much of the town was re-forested by the CCC in the 1930s.

== Geography ==
According to the United States Census Bureau, the town has a total area of 26.0 square miles (67.3 km^{2}), of which 25.9 square miles (67.0 km^{2}) is land and 0.12 square miles (0.3 km^{2}), or 0.47%, is water.

The southern town line is the border of Tompkins County, and the eastern town boundary is the border of Cortland County.

New York State Route 90 is an east-west highway in south of Summerhill. New York State Route 41A crosses the northeastern part of the town.

=== Adjacent towns and areas ===
The town of Sempronius is to the north, and the town of Locke is to the west. The town of Groton in Tompkins County is on the south, and the town of Homer in Cortland County is on the east.

== Demographics ==
Historical population
Census	Pop.	Note	%±
1840	1,446		—
1850	1,251		−13.5%
1860	1,194		−4.6%
1870	1,036		−13.2%
1880	1,028		−0.8%
1890	864		−16.0%
1900	779		−9.8%
1910	613		−21.3%
1920	539		−12.1%
1930	448		−16.9%
1940	505		12.7%
1950	542		7.3%
1960	667		23.1%
1970	670		0.4%
1980	850		26.9%
1990	1,017		19.6%
2000	1,098		8.0%
2010	1,217		10.8%
2016 (est.)	1,168		−4.0%
U.S. Decennial Census

As of the census of 2000, there were 1,098 people, 393 households, and 304 families residing in the town. The population density was 42.4 inhabitants per square mile (16.4/km^{2}). There were 463 housing units at an average density of 17.9 per square mile (6.9/km^{2}). The racial makeup of the town was 99.27% White, 0.18% African American, 0.18% Native American, and 0.36% from two or more races. Hispanic or Latino of any race were 0.64% of the population.

There were 393 households, out of which 37.4% had children under the age of 18 living with them, 60.3% were married couples living together, 7.9% had a female householder with no husband present, and 22.6% were non-families. 16.0% of all households were made up of individuals, and 6.1% had someone living alone who was 65 years of age or older. The average household size was 2.79 and the average family size was 3.06.

In the town, the population was spread out, with 29.2% under the age of 18, 7.6% from 18 to 24, 30.1% from 25 to 44, 23.8% from 45 to 64, and 9.3% who were 65 years of age or older. The median age was 36 years. For every 100 females, there were 105.2 males. For every 100 females age 18 and over, there were 105.0 males.

The median income for a household in the town was $39,000, and the median income for a family was $39,500. Males had a median income of $26,336 versus $24,375 for females. The per capita income for the town was $14,609. About 6.9% of families and 12.1% of the population were below the poverty line, including 21.8% of those under age 18 and 2.0% of those age 65 or over.

== Notable people ==
- Millard Fillmore (1800–1874), 13th President of the United States, 12th Vice President of the United States and last member of the Whig Party to be president
- William H. Peters, member of the Wisconsin State Assembly
- Elbridge G. Spaulding, congressman, mayor of Buffalo, New York, and treasurer of New York

== Communities and locations in Summerhill ==
- Como – A hamlet in the northeastern part of the town on NY Route 41A.
- Empire Haven Nudist Park – Host of the Northeast Naturist Festival.
- Fall Creek – A stream flowing southward in the eastern part of Summerhill. The creek joins Cayuga Lake in Ithaca.
- Fillmore Glen State Park – The state park in the northwest of the town (and in the town of Locke) contains a replica of Millard Fillmore's birthplace.
- Four Town Corners – A location in the northwestern corner of the town.
- Halls Corners – A hamlet on the eastern side of the town on NY Route 90, east of Summer Hill.
- Lake Como (formerly "Locke Pond") – A small lake west of the community of Como.
- Summer Hill – The hamlet of Summer Hill is in the southern part of the town on NY-90.
