= Japanese primrose =

Japanese primrose may refer to two species of plant within the family Primulaceae:

- Primula japonica, native to Japan
- Primula sieboldii, endemic to East Asia
