= Cornell Botanic Gardens =

Botanical garden in Ithaca, New York, United States

Coordinates: 42°26′58″N 76°28′20″W

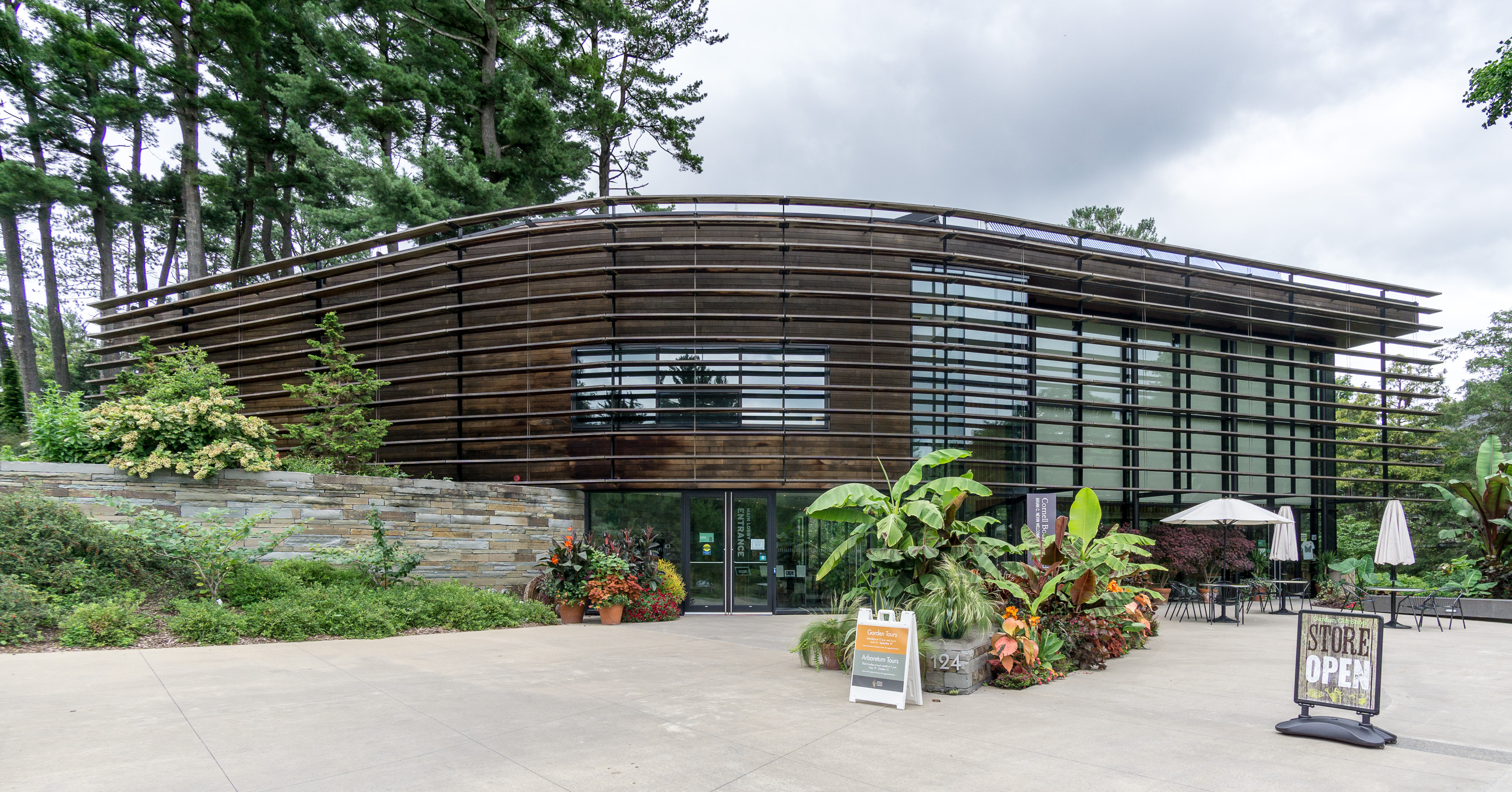
- Nevin Welcome Center at the Botanic Gardens
- Interactive map of Cornell Botanic Gardens
- Nearest city: Ithaca, New York, United States
- Area: 4,300 acres (1,700 ha)
- Established: 1875
- Owner: Cornell University
- Budget: $5.2 million (2025)
- Parking: On site
- Website: Official website

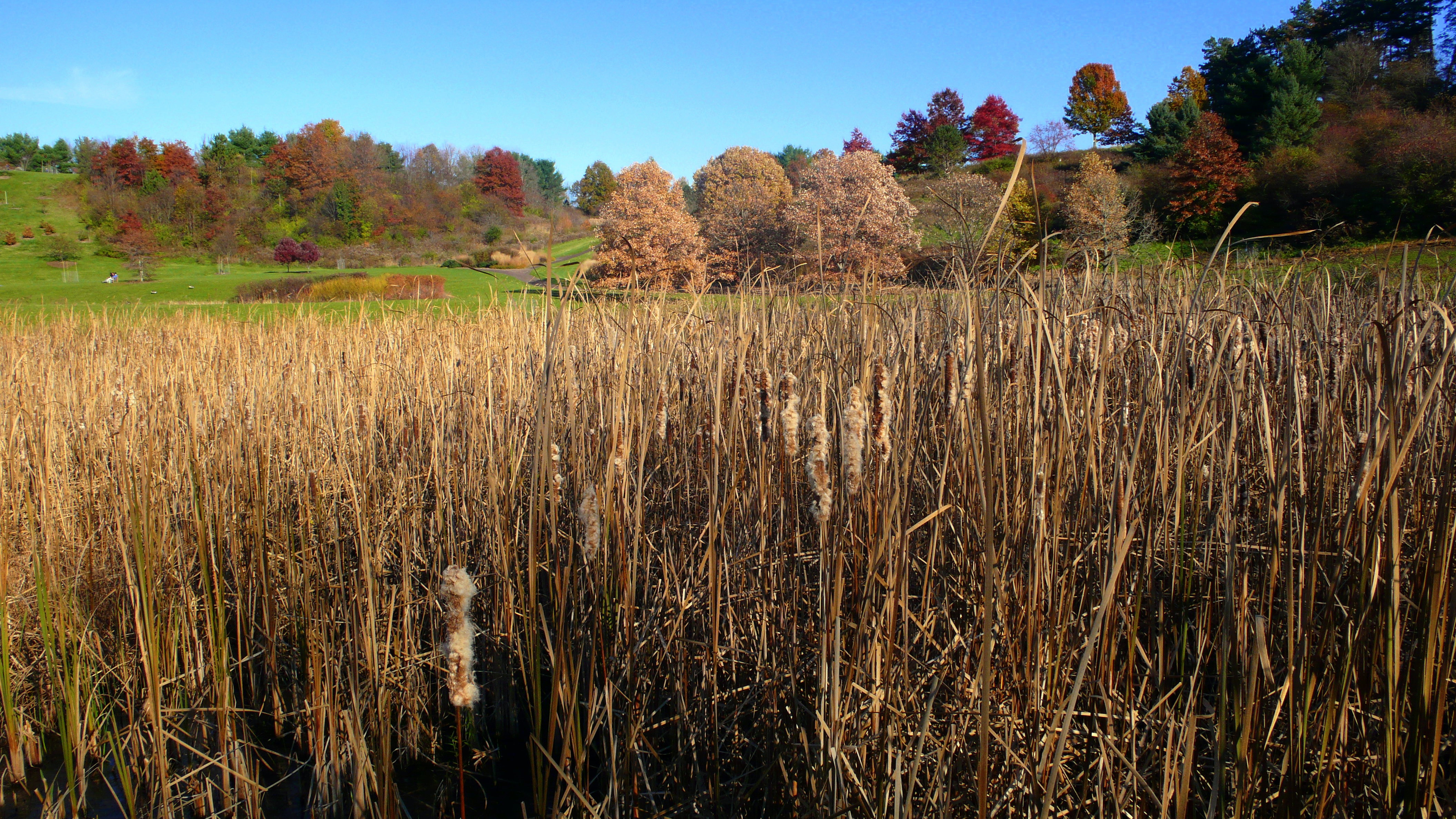
F. R. Newman Arboretum in the Botanic Gardens

The Cornell Botanic Gardens is a botanical garden located adjacent to the Cornell University campus in Ithaca, New York. The Botanic Gardens proper consist of 25 acres (10 ha) of botanical gardens and 150 acres (61 ha) of the F. R. Newman Arboretum. The greater Botanic Gardens includes 40 different nature areas around Cornell and Ithaca, covering 4,300 acres (1,700 ha).

The origin of the Botanic Gardens dates back to Cornell's beginning in the mid-19th century and are part of the university's longtime interest in agriculture, forestry, and the natural sciences. The Botanic Gardens saw a major planting effort during the 1930s and assumed the name Cornell Plantations in 1944. Gardens and facilities have continually expanded, including a construction program at the start of the 21st century. The Botanic Gardens also maintains four gardens on Cornell's central campus. The Botanic Gardens offers three courses for academic credit, are used as a resource by other classes, host a number of informal lectures and tours, and have played a part in many scholarly papers. As of 2025, the Botanic Gardens had a $5.2 million annual operating budget. The name was changed to the current form in 2016.

The gardens specialize in trees and shrubs native to New York State. The themed herb garden is especially noted. The Botanic Gardens have been the subject of several books and films over the years, are open daily without charge, and have been recommended as a visitation site by a number of travel books and newspaper travel sections.

== History ==
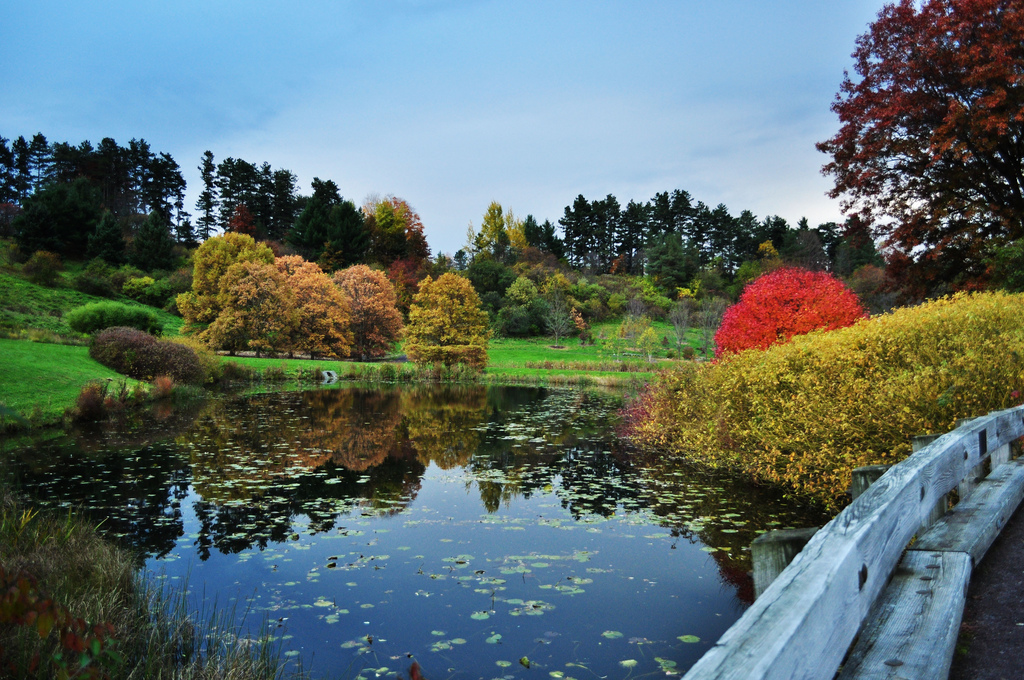
One of the ponds at the Cornell Botanic Gardens

Prior to the founding of Cornell University, Ezra Cornell had a large farm on the East Hill above Ithaca, New York. As part of locating New York State's land-grant college in Ithaca, Cornell offered to donate the farm for use as a campus. In 1862, Cornell's first president, Andrew Dickson White, wrote a colleague that a great university should include a botanical garden: “It must have the best of Libraries – collections in different departments – Laboratory – Observatory – Botanical Garden perhaps…” At the university's opening ceremony in 1868, Louis Agassiz, an internationally known naturalist, remarked that no other area could compete with Cornell's surroundings in the opportunities offered for the study of natural history. From its inception, Cornell formed a reputation for creative means of research into the natural sciences, including the establishment of the pioneering College of Agriculture.

When the university built its first women's dormitory in 1875, it included a conservatory for growing plants and a specimen tree collection. Separately, the College of Veterinary Medicine started a specialized garden of plants that are poisonous to livestock. Cornell's farm included two deep gorges which flanked both sides of the early campus, and as the campus developed the gorges remained undeveloped and filled with native plants and wildlife. These became the start of the on-campus gardens and arboretum. A goal of creating an explicit arboretum was proposed in various university reports to trustees and other publications in 1877, 1883, 1908, and 1914.

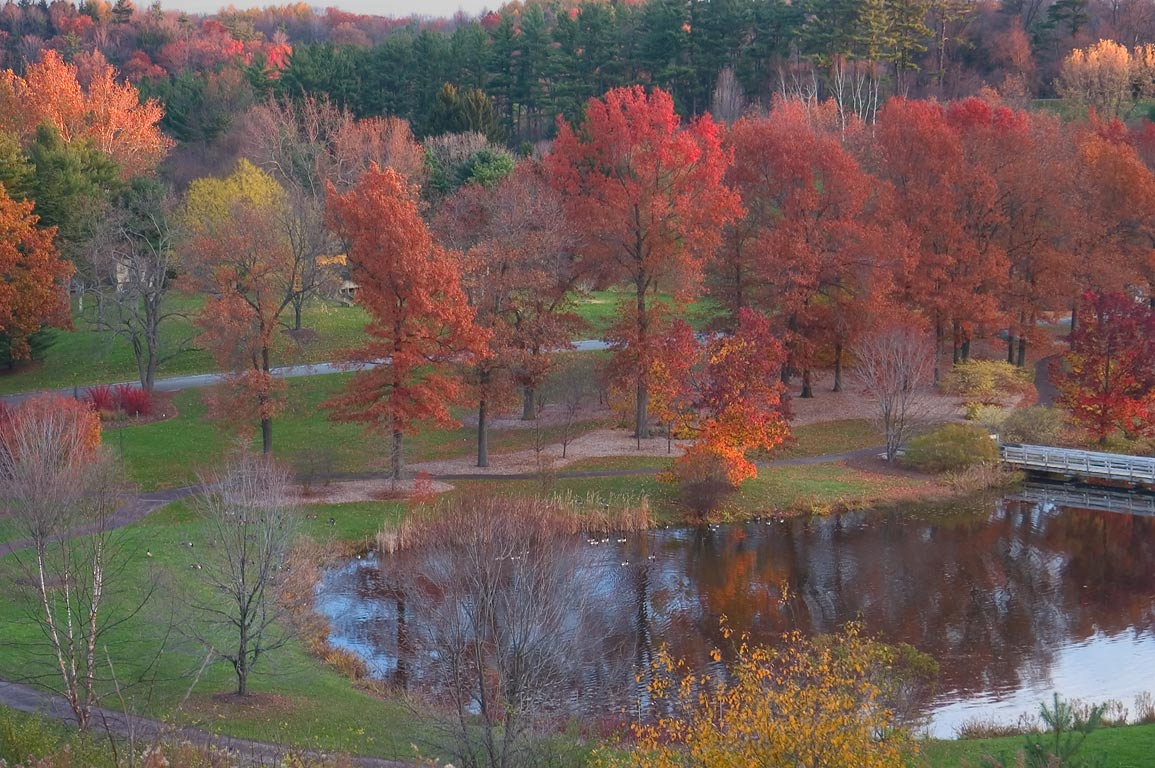
Houston Pond at the Arboretum; nearby is a site for events

Cornell's acquisition of off-campus forest land dates to 1898 and the founding of the New York State College of Forestry, which was the first forestry college in North America. As a part of establishing that school, Cornell acquired a demonstration forest near Saranac Lake in the Adirondack Mountains. The harvesting of trees from that forest drew heated opposition from neighboring land owners. Although political opposition caused Cornell to transfer the forest lands under the "forever wild" protection of the Adirondack Forest Preserve and to transfer Cornell's forestry education programs to its College of Agriculture, Cornell continued to acquire forest land remote from its main campus. In 1935, the decision to create an arboretum was finally made and the university established the Arboretum as a separate department. From 1935 to 1940, the federal government's Civilian Conservation Corps Camp SP 48 devoted 170 to 200 workers to planting trees, constructing dikes, and building trails in order to develop the Arboretum.

In 1944, Liberty Hyde Bailey, the Dean emeritus of the College of Agriculture and a horticulturalist highly regarded around the world, proposed the name Cornell Plantations for an expanded department in a report that reflected the work of a number of botany and horticulture professors. By 1948, the Plantations numbered 1,000 acres (400 ha) and the first Director was named, John F. Cornman. During a 1949 broadcast on widely heard radio station WGY, Cornell emeritus professor Bristow Adams reflected upon the now five-year-old Plantations, and stated that the relationship between humans and things that grow were of utmost importance and that gardens, forests, and parks were everlasting collections that "have the care and trusteeships of generation after generation."

In the mid-1960s, the sculpture garden was constructed in the middle of the Arboretum as a project of the College of Architecture Art and Planning. By 1965, the Plantations consisted of 1,500 acres (610 ha). By 1970, the university was issuing a publication called The Cornell Plantations, which contained general articles on nature and environmental topics. Beginning in the early 1970s, the Arboretum was upgraded with new roads and plantings funded by major gifts from oil industry figure Floyd R. Newman, and in 1982 the Arboretum was formally named in his honor (as were several other buildings and facilities at Cornell over the years).

During the 1980s, the Plantations experienced people stealing pines and firs for Christmas trees, with in some cases trees being taken that were worth several thousand dollars. A successful countermeasure created by Gerardo Sciarra at the Plantations was covering the trees with a harmless yet visually unpleasant "Ugly Mix" spray that included hydrated limestone, an anti-desiccant, and water. The technique was subsequently recommended to others worried about tree theft. In 2009, the Plantations suffered from a series of thefts of new or rare plants. A director at the Plantations, which had no security in place, said that the thieves must have been experienced horticulturalists and that the loss of research and species had been a demoralizing experience.

At the start of the 21st century, the Plantations embarked on a construction program which included: Arboretum Center (2000), Horticultural Center (2001), Mullestein Winter Garden (2002), Ramin Administration Building (2003), Rowley Carpenter Shop (2004), Plant Production Facility (2007), and Lewis Education Center (2008). The $7.5 million Brian C. Nevin Welcome Center was dedicated on October 28, 2010. Five years in the designing and building, the new facility was built to LEED gold standards and won a 2010 Award of Excellence from Canadian Architect magazine.

By the 2010s, the name Cornell Plantations was proving problematic, due to the association of the word with plantations in the American South and slavery in the United States. In 2015 the university's Black Students United organization demanded that Cornell "change the name of [it] as soon as possible." The name was technically inaccurate as well, with plantations usually being a large-scale monocultural for commercial purposes, which this was not. A change of the name was under consideration for the better part of ten years, and then during 2014–16 there were focus groups, surveys, and polls taken to determine a favorite among nine possible different names for the Plantations, and Cornell Botanic Gardens was chosen as the new name in 2016.

== Current extent ==
=== F.R. Newman Arboretum ===
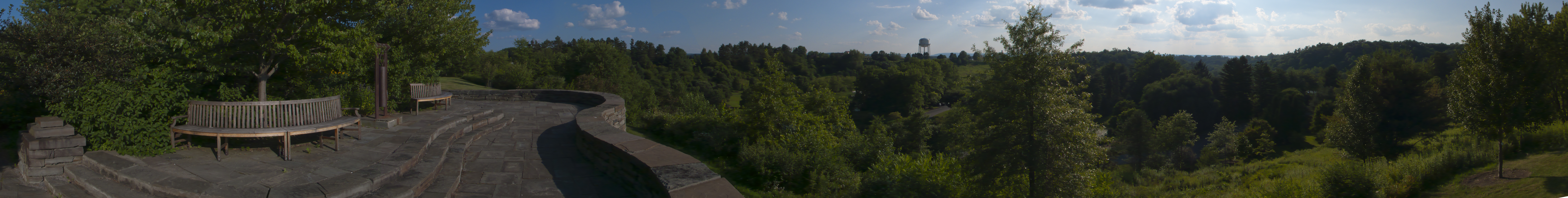
A panoramic view from Newman Overlook, one of the highest points in the arboretum and campus

The F.R. Newman arboretum contains the following collections on 150 acres (61 ha):

Chestnut Collection
Established in 2000 with 5 transplanted, grafted chestnut trees for each of 5 cultivars. At present 4 trees remain, representing 3 of the 5 cultivars. Eventually 25 cultivars will be represented.

American Chestnut: Mundy Wildflower Garden, Schnee Oak Collection, Bald Hill and Caroline Pinnacles, Cayuta Lake, Ringwood Ponds, South Hill Swamp. Source of plant: The American Chestnut Foundation, Allen Nichols, Stanley Scharf

Conifer Collection
Several sites with 21 taxa of firs (excluding dwarf forms), 39 of pines, and 25 of spruces.
Flowering Crabapple Collection
83 cultivars in a new collection; many trees are quite small.
Maple Collection
One of the core collections. One site contains red maple (Acer rubrum), Sugar Maple (Acer saccharum), Silver Maple (Acer saccharinum), and Striped Maple (Acer pensylvanicum). Another contains an overstory of Acer × freemanii with an understory of shade-loving maples, including snakebark maples (Acer davidii and Acer tegmentosum) and small trees similar to the Japanese maple, such as Acer shirasawanum and Acer pseudosieboldianum. A third site consists primarily of small Asian Maples.
Oak Collection
50 oak taxa in a fairly young collection, with a goal of acquiring all species hardy in Zone 5.
Urban Tree Collection
Planted throughout the arboretum.
Walnut Collection
The oldest collection, planted in the early 1960s. 20 cultivars, representing Black Walnut (Juglans nigra), Butternut (Juglans cinerea) and Heartnut (Juglans ailanthifolia).

In addition, the arboretum features an extensive set of trails.

=== Botanical gardens ===
The botanical gardens specialize in trees and shrubs native to New York State. Overall, they contain a wide variety of ornamental, useful, and native plants on 25 acres (10 ha), arranged into gardens as follows:

Container Gardens
Ornamental plants suitable for growing in containers, such as Agastache foeniculum, Agave, Alocasia esculenta, Amaranthus, Canna × generalis, Celosia, Coleus, Colocasia, Cordyline, Cuphea, Cycad, Duranta erecta, Eucalyptus cinerea, Fuchsia, Hibiscus acetosella, Iresine, Lantana camara, Melianthus major, Perilla frutescens, Phormium tenax, Salpiglossis sinuata, and Solenostemon scutellarioides.

Deans Garden
Herbaceous and woody plants, many uncommon in the Ithaca area, such as Vancouveria hexanra and Stuartia pseudocamellia.

Decorative Arts Flower Garden
A wide variety of flowers including sunflower, carnation, rose, poppy, peony, iris, lily, chrysanthemum, daisy, and tulip.

Flowering Shrub and Ornamental Grass Garden
Flowering shrubs, ornamental grasses, and perennials including daylillies. Shrubs include Hypericum, Hydrangea, and Potentilla; grasses include Calamagrostis, Chasmanthium latifolium, Festuca, Miscanthus, Molinia, Panicum virgatum, Pennisetum alopecuroides, and Saccharum ravennae.

Groundcover Garden
Groundcovers including Asarum, Athyrium, Cyclamen hederifolium, Dryopteris, Helleborus orientalis, Hosta, Lysimachia, Marrubium, and Pachysandra.

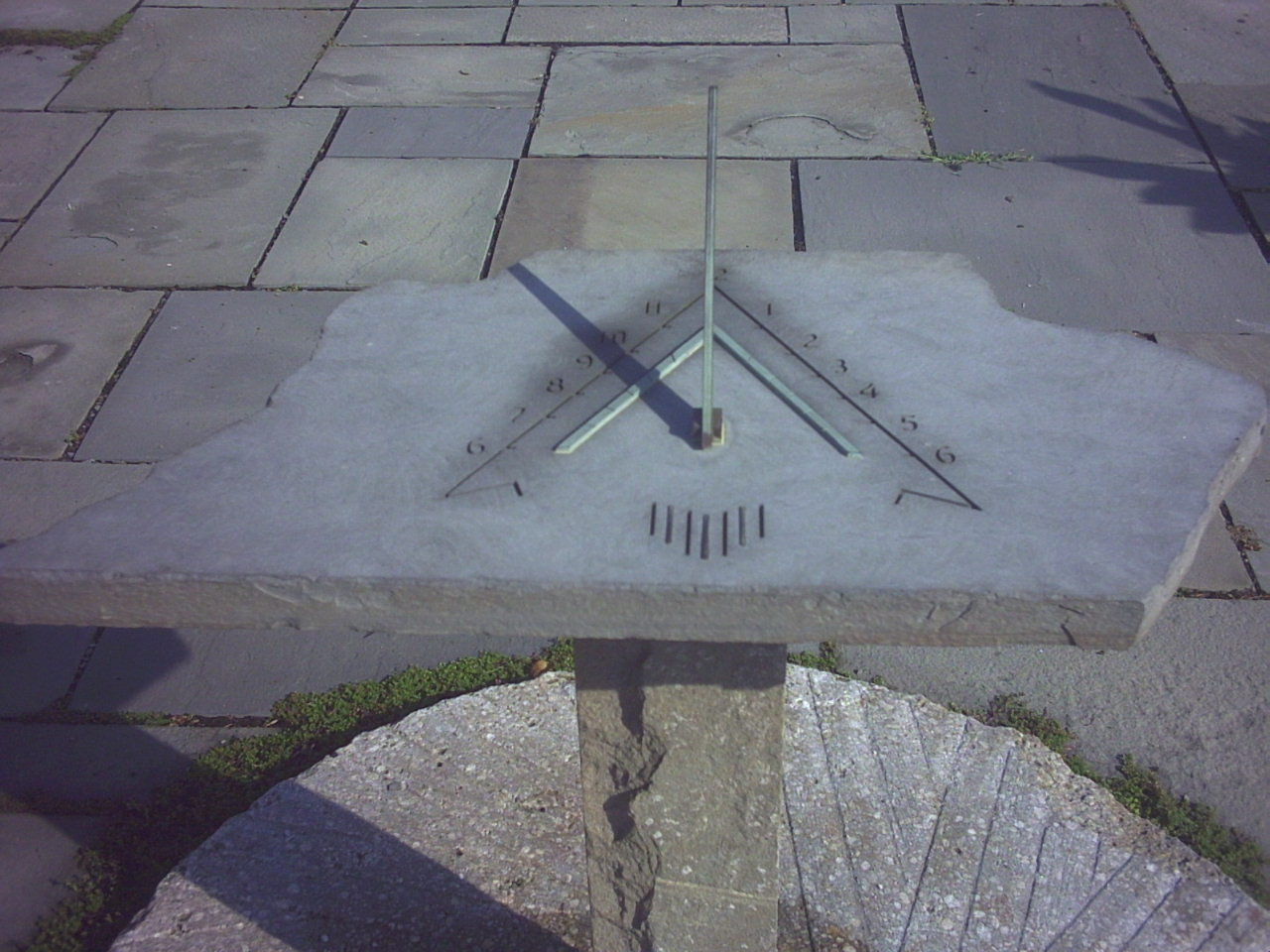
A sundial at the Robison Herb Garden

Robison Herb Garden
Opened in 1974 after 20 years of being envisioned and 2 years of construction, it consists of 17 raised beds of herbs, arranged by theme as follows: Ornamental Herbs; Herbs of the Ancients; Herbs in Literature; Bee Herbs; Salads and Potherbs; Edible flowers; Herbs of the Native Americans; Medicinal Herbs; Culinary Herbs; Economic Herbs; Dye Herbs; Tea Herbs; Fragrant Herbs; Sacred Herbs; Scented Geraniums; Savory Seed Herbs; and Tussie-Mussies and Nosegays. The sources to begin the garden came from around the world, with some species linked to cultures from antiquity. More than 500 plants are included. The design inspired plans for a similar herb garden in New London, Connecticut in 1980.

Heritage Vegetable Garden
Four beds, representing typical vegetables grown in the northeastern United States in the 18th century, the late 19th century, World Wars I and II, and today's gardens. Such gardens are not common. The gardener in charge of it has been mentioned in newspaper columns as an expert in growing tomatoes.

International Crop and Weed Garden
Crop plants and economically important plants from around the world, including bananas, sugar cane, coffee, tea, sorghum, cotton, grasses, and forbs (non-grass plants eaten by livestock); also a collection of weeds arranged in an attractive agricultural setting.

Peony and Sun Perennial Garden
Over 90 cultivars of peonies, as well as a display of recent perennial cultivars suitable for sunny locations.

Poisonous Plants Garden
Plants poisonous to livestock, including Atropa, Chelidonium, Cicuta, Digitalis, Lobelia, Phytolacca, and Rheum. (Although Cannabis was included in the garden for many years, it was removed by the early 1970s.)

Rhododendron and Woodland Perennial Garden
Hundreds of rhododendrons and azaleas, set among white pines, ferns, hostas, etc.

Rock Garden
Rock garden, including Aethionema, Arenaria, Aubrieta, Cymbalaria, Dianthus, Erigeron, Globularia, Houstonia, Leiophyllum, Linaria, Penstemon, Pulsatilla, Sedum, Silene, Hebe, etc.

Wildflower Garden
Wildflowers including skunk cabbage, trout lily, marsh marigold, and trillium.

Winter Garden
Plants interesting in all seasons, including dogwood, willow, birch, hawthorn, and dwarf to midsize conifers.

Woodland Streamside Garden
A boardwalk through a boggy areas including royal ferns, blue and yellow flag iris, and Japanese primrose.

=== Nature areas ===
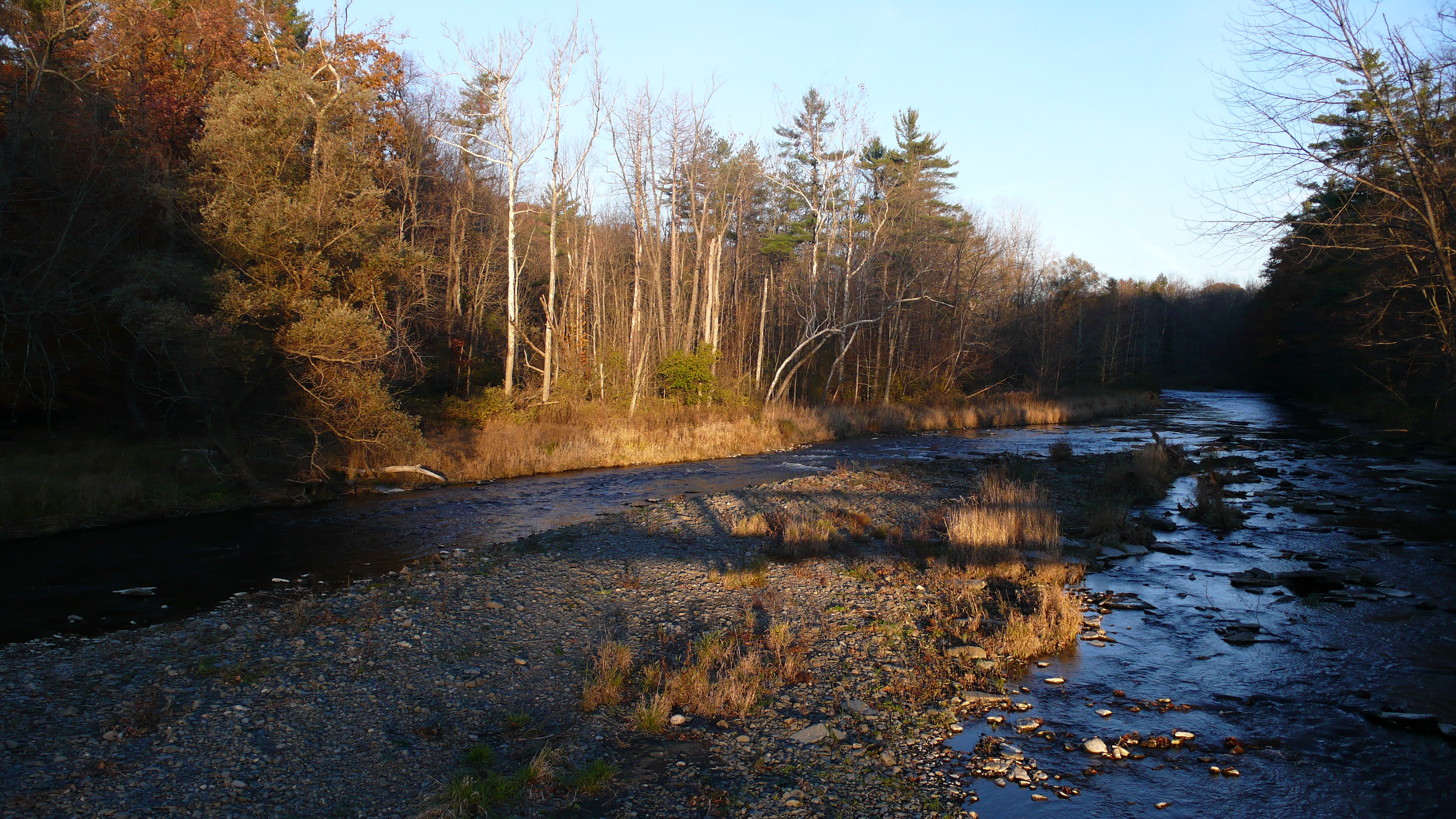
Fall Creek flows through the Botanic Gardens

In addition to the gardens and arboretum, Cornell Botanic Gardens also manages an additional 3,500 acres (1,400 ha) of biologically diverse natural areas, including bogs, fens, gorges, glens, meadows, and woodlands. These areas contain some 9 miles (14 km) of walking trails.

- Bald Hill – Mountain laurel (Kalmia latifolia) is abundant in this area.
- Beebe Lake and Woods – In 1828, to capture the waterpower of Fall Creek, Ezra Cornell helped construct Beebe Dam on Fall Creek. The dam and Lake have since been upgraded.
- Bluegrass Lane Natural Areas – located near the Robert Trent Jones Golf Course.
- Brooktondale Meadow
- Carter Creek Preserve – 244 acres (99 ha) of woodlands about 14 miles (23 km) southwest of Cornell.
- Cascadilla Gorge – a gorge formed as Cascadilla Creek drops 400 feet (120 m) from the campus to downtown Ithaca, with a walking trail and many waterfalls.
- Cascadilla Meadows – Cascadilla Creek was channelized when the Wilson Lab was constructed in this meadow flood plain.
- Cayuga Marsh – a low-lying wetland of cattails (Typha latifolia) at the north end of Lake Cayuga.
- Cayuga Lake – 95 acres (38 ha) on northeast shore.
- Etna Fringed Gentian Area
- Fall Creek Valley North
- Fall Creek Valley South
- Fischer Old-Growth Forest – a 42-acre (17 ha) preserve containing rare examples of yellow oak (Quercus muehlenbergii).
- Hertel Bowl
- Lick Brook
- Lighthouse Point – a biological station located a bit over 3 miles (5 km) from campus on the eastern shore of Lake Cayuga.
- McDaniel Meadow, Woods and Swamp – 60-acre (24 ha) former farm about 7 miles (11 km) north of campus.
- McGowan Woods and Meadow
- McLean Bogs a National Natural Landmark containing two small kettle bogs located in Dryden, New York.
- Mitchell Street Natural Areas – examples of abandoned agricultural land.
- Monkey Run
- Mount Pleasant
- Mundy Wildflower Garden
- North Campus Natural Areas
- Park Park – Forest Home Drive near New York Route 366
- Polson Natural Area
- Purvis Road Natural Areas – 43 acres (17 ha)
- Renwick Slope
- Slaterville 600 – 600 acres (240 ha) that includes the Slaterville Wildflower Preserve and old growth forest, given to the university by the Lloyd Library and Museum under condition that it remain forever wild.
- Slim Jim Woods – borders the arboretum.
- Steep Hollow Creek
- The Tarr-Young Preserve
- Turkey Hill Road Meadow
- Upper Cascadilla
- Warren Woods – 37 acres (15 ha)

== Academic role ==
Typically the Botanic Gardens' Director has been funded as a professor of Horticulture in the College of Agriculture and Life Sciences, although 85 percent of the Botanic Gardens' budget has come from gifts. The Botanic Gardens continue to grow as it receives donations of environmentally sensitive land throughout New York State. As of 2025, the Botanic Gardens had $4.6 million in income, and $5.2 million in expenses.

In conjunction with the Department of Horticulture in the College of Agriculture, the Plantations has sponsored a Graduate Fellowship in Public Garden Leadership, where students earn a Master of Professional Studies degree after a four-semester program. The program of study requires an internship, selection of a particular topic of interest, and completion of an action project. Numerous scientific papers have been published that relate to work done at the Plantations or written by academics affiliated with the Plantations. This includes a number of master's theses and Ph.D. dissertations done by students. Students from local schools and 4-H Clubs have also made use of the Plantations, as have master gardeners.

The Plantations offers three courses for academic credit and a number of informal lectures and tours. Lab work is done at the Plantations by students taking other courses in various subjects, including geology courses in the interdisciplinary Department of Earth and Atmospheric Sciences. Indeed, the greater Plantations has a connection of some kind to over a hundred courses at Cornell. As one description stated, academic departments or individuals using the Plantations have included "geologists, archaeologists, physiologists, horticulturalists, artists, architects, and engineers." The Plantations' Director has also been responsible for summer session courses at the Plantations aimed towards alumni and horticultural enthusiasts.

The Botanic Gardens operate side-by-side with Cornell's other programs. Cornell's academic buildings, which are owned by either the university or New York State (for statutory college buildings), are on a landscaped campus with Plantations' gardens interspersed among them; the Plantations maintains four such gardens on Cornell's central campus. In addition, the College of Agriculture operates the Arnot Woods as a teaching forest, about 15 miles (24 km) southwest of Ithaca; it was given to the university in 1927. Near the Plantations, the College operates the Dilmun Hill Student Farm, which practices sustainable agriculture. The College operates Campus Area Farms that comprise 11 different farms and 325 acres (132 ha) on campus and nearby. The difference between the Plantations and these other adjacent properties is that the Plantations are open to the public and are designed for both instruction as well as leisure, while the other properties are closed to the general public and focused upon teaching and research. Aside from physical proximity, the Plantations has affiliations with a number of Cornell academic departments. In fact, during the latter part of the 20th century, public gardens attached to colleges and universities such as the Plantations became a popular trend, due to the beneficial effects they had on campus unity and recruitment of students, creating bonds with and outreach to the local community, and providing a basis for ongoing research as well as establishing a living museum.

The Plantations earned a relatively brief mention as a campus diversion in the 112-page Cornell Desk Book publication of 1972 aimed at incoming students. The Cornell Daily Sun listed it in 2010 as one of the natural wonders of the Cornell and Ithaca areas that students frequently went past, or lived near to, without noticing.

A 1973 survey of public arboreta by The New York Times listed the Plantations as one of the 17 best in the Eastern U.S. for educational value. The same paper characterized the Robison Herb Garden as "a student's living reference library" when it opened in 1974.

The 200-page volume The Cornell Plantations, written by Ralph S. Hosmer, was published by the university in 1947, shortly after the gardens were so named. A film Cornell Plantations was made during 1974–1975 and shown on PBS in Connecticut and elsewhere. In 1987, the Plantations released a VHS video entitled A Year in the Garden, which showed seasonal changes in the F. R. Newman Arboretum and along the trails. The New York Times called the effort "thin" and best suited for Cornell alumni. The university published the volume Cornell Plantations Path Guide: The Gardens, Gorges, Landscapes, and Lore of Cornell in 1995, and a 172-page second edition was published with a slightly altered title in 2002.

Working with the Newman's Own Foundation and the Center for Plant Conservation, the Plantations are trying to restore the regional population of the American globeflower (Trollius laxus). The Plantations are trying to use predatory beetles (Laricobius nigrinus) to control the spread of the hemlock wooly adelgid (HWA).

== Events and visiting ==
The Plantations are open daily without charge from dawn to dusk. From the campus, one walks out Forest Home Drive past the College of Agriculture quadrangle; the nearest highway is New York State Route 366.

The New York Times has recommended Cornell Plantations as a place to visit several times, calling it "a satisfying experience" in 1965, one of the sights of Cornell in 1979, a destination along a bicycling tour in 1985, "another free diversion" in 1989, and "one last outing before leaving [Ithaca]" in 2002. The Boston Globe recommended the Plantations in 2000 as a "free to the public museum of living plants". In 2007, The Ithaca Journal referred to it as "one of the area's gems" and three years later said it "combines the best of walking with the eye appeal of well tended gardens". The Buffalo News portrayed the Plantations in 2010 as one of the places that made Cornell worth a vacation for non-students.

National Geographic's 1998 guide to the 300 best public gardens in North America has an entry for the Plantations. The American Automobile Association's New York TourBook lists the Plantations as one of five arboreta and sixty gardens in the state; it does not get the "GEM" rating that one of the arboreta and ten of the gardens receive. Fodor's travel book for New York State lists the Plantations as an ordinary entry and says the gardens have "interesting cold-weather colors and textures". The Moon Handbooks volume for the state also lists it as a regular entry, without much commentary, as does the Great Destinations series The Finger Lakes Book. The Fun with the Family Upstate New York volume groups it with several other sights as "a real bargain" to explore for free. Most enthusiastic is the Frommer's travel guide for New York State, which rates the Plantations as a one-star ("highly recommended") sight, saying the Plantations is "a real find and well worth a visit for garden lovers or anyone seeking a bit of solace." The herb garden and knoll of rhododendrons come in for particular praise.

The Plantations provide a venue for a number of annual activities, including a "Fall In" festival, a celebration of Arbor Day and the Cornell Reunion 5 Mile Run. The Plantations is one of eight cultural and educational sites on the Ithaca Discovery Trail network. The Friends of the Gorges is a Cornell student organization, supported by Cornell Plantations, that performs trail repair and maintenance and clean-ups.

== See also ==
- List of botanical gardens in the United States
- North American Plant Collections Consortium
