= McLean Bogs =

- Interactive map of McLean Bogs
- Location: Dryden, New York
- Coordinates: 42°32′55″N 76°15′58″W
- Area: 81 acres (33 ha)
- Governing body: Cornell Botanic Gardens

U.S. National Natural Landmark
- Designated: 1983

McLean Bogs is a National Natural Landmark containing two small kettle bogs located in Dryden, New York. It was donated to Cornell University by Curtis G. Lloyd in the 1930s, and an 81-acre (33 ha) site containing the bogs and surrounding woodlands was declared a National Natural Landmark in May 1983.

The site contains two bogs; one acidic and one alkaline. One bog is approximately 70 metres (230 ft) wide with a peat depth of eight metres (26 ft) and contains several species of sphagnum moss. There are over 66 species of lichens in the bog, primarily corticolous and lignicolous types.

Cornell Botanic Gardens manages the site and restricts public access. One of the key research areas in the bog is to better understand how different types of microbial species creates methane gas in peat bogs.

== See also ==
- List of National Natural Landmarks in New York
