= Lake Como (New York) =

Lake in New York, United States

- Location within New York Location within the United States
- Location: Cayuga County, New York, United States
- Coordinates: 42°40′26″N 76°17′52″W
- Primary outflows: Lake Como Outlet
- Basin countries: United States
- Surface area: 64 acres (0.26 km^{2})
- Average depth: 7 feet (2.1 m)
- Max. depth: 22 ft (6.7 m)
- Shore length^{1}: 1.5 miles (2.4 km)
- Surface elevation: 1,309 ft (399 m)
- Settlements: Summer hill, New York
- ^{1} Shore length is not a well-defined measure.

Lake Como is located near Como, New York. Fish species present in the lake include black crappie, bluegill, white sucker, yellow perch, tiger muskie, black bullhead, channel catfish, rock bass, pickerel, and pumpkinseed sunfish. There is access via boat launch for a fee on the north shore off County Road 103. The Lake drains via the Lake Como outlet, which is largely enclosed in the Dorothy McIlroy Bird Sanctuary, a 157-acre protected area that includes a 1.4 mile (4.3 kilometer) waking trail.
