= Sciencenter =

Science museum in Ithaca, New York

Coordinates: 42°27′0.2″N 76°30′15.8″W

- Established: 1983
- Location: Ithaca, New York, off of route 34 and 13 United States
- Visitors: 104,102 (2023)
- Director: Michelle Kortenaar
- Website: Sciencenter

Ithaca Discovery Trail
- Herbert F. Johnson Museum of Art; Sciencenter; Cornell Botanic Gardens; Museum of the Earth; Cayuga Nature Center; Tompkins County Public Library; The History Center; Cornell Lab of Ornithology

Sciencenter is a hands-on science museum in Ithaca, New York. It was founded on February 28, 1983 as a 501(c)(3) not-for-profit educational organization. The Sciencenter grew out of the volunteer-run hands-on science program run for 15 years at several elementary schools in the Ithaca City School District. The community-based tradition continued as the museum grew to be nationally known, despite not having a paid staff until the 1990s. The Sciencenter is accredited by the American Alliance of Museums (AAM), and is a member of the Association of Science-Technology Centers (ASTC) and Association of Children's Museums.

== History ==
=== Beginnings ===
The Sciencenter grew out of the vision of community volunteers Debbie Levin and Ilma Levine who sought to expand upon the "Science Discovery Room Program" they developed with Beverly J. Martin at Central Elementary School (now called Beverly J. Martin Elementary School) in the 1970s-1980s. In 1982, an ad was placed in the Ithaca Journal inviting any individual interested in starting a community science center to meet at the local public library. From this group emerged a board of directors, which laid the foundation for the success of the organization.

=== Early operations ===
The early Sciencenter was somewhat nomadic as its gallery spaces moved among several donated storefronts in downtown Ithaca. The first exhibition space was opened in 1984 at 200 East Buffalo Street, in space donated by Sciarabba Walker and Co. When the Sciencenter had to move, it was able to find free space in the old Hickey's Music Store on South Tioga Street. Volunteers built exhibits, a small museum store was added, and schools were invited to bring classes for hands-on programs. From 1986 to 1989, membership and attendance grew, and the base of volunteers expanded. When the Sciencenter was forced to close its Tioga Street site to make way for a new county building, Ithaca Center Associates offered temporary space. The Sciencenter relocated to the Center Ithaca complex during 1989 and in 1990 closed its exhibit space to focus on the task of building a permanent home.

=== Plans for a permanent facility ===
By the fall of 1988, it had become clear the organization would need to find larger and more permanent quarters to remain viable in the long term. Architect Bob Leathers, of Leathers and Associates, nationally known for his innovative community-built playgrounds and Ithaca resident, offered his services to help design a structure that would serve as home to the Sciencenter. Leathers proposed the Sciencenter be built by members of the community – including businesspersons, secretaries, store clerks, teachers, bricklayers, electricians, university professors, doctors, grandparents, and children. The result would be a science museum that belonged to the entire community, because they had built it.

=== The first campaign ===
The campaign began in 1990 with a donation of $50,000 by Vector Magnetics, Inc., an Ithaca technology firm. In October 1990, the board, under chair Bruce Thompson, hired registered professional engineer and geologist, Dr. Charles Trautmann, as executive director. The project was announced in February 1991 at a party at Rock Stream Studios, then at 235 Cherry St. in Ithaca, that was attended by 500 individuals and highlighted by presentations by Mayor Benjamin Nichols, Assemblyman Marty Luster, State Senator Jim Seward, Congressman Matt McHugh, Cornell President Emeritus Dale Corson, Nobel Laureate Hans Bethe, and Cornell astronomer Carl Sagan. Trautmann and Thompson were able to secure pledges from several donors for $250,000 to move the project forward. Under their leadership, the Sciencenter board, staff, and volunteers developed refined architectural plans, formulated a business plan, and laid the groundwork for a $1 million fundraising campaign. The proposed building would be about 5,000 square feet (460 m^{2}) in area and would have an adjacent outdoor science park.

=== Phase 1 construction ===
Phase 1 construction of the Sciencenter was accomplished as a result of valuable contributions by a steering committee, corporate lead support, individual and community donors, challenge grant campaign, and community volunteers. Emerson Power Transmission Corporation and Wegmans Food Markets donated cash. A $90,000 demonstration project grant for the heating system was provided by the New York State Electric and Gas Corporation. Many other local businesses assisted with donations of building materials or deep discounts on products and services. Restaurants provided food during the building periods, as did many individuals. Cornell fundraiser Sherri Bergman, anxious to join the challenge of creating a community-built science center, was hired to help with the project. The cash portion of the campaign was capped with a $100,000 challenge grant from the Kresge Foundation. A major commitment to a volunteer-built project was a first for the foundation. Groundbreaking officially took place at a ceremony in August 1992, and construction took place between August 1992 and May 1993, with 2,200 volunteers donating more than 40,000 hours of labor to the project. The grand opening took place on May 22, 1993, slightly less than ten months after groundbreaking. During the early days, visitors streamed into the museum at a rate of about 50,000 per year to interact with the exhibits and take part in the educational programs offered by the museum.

=== Museum expansion ===
Exhibit development was rapid and prolific, and by 1995 a number of exhibits were in storage for lack of display space. Demand for programs continued to grow, additional NSF project grants were in hand, and the staff was twice as large as had been projected in a 1992 pre-construction business plan. To accommodate this growth, the Sciencenter leased an adjacent brick building from the City of Ithaca to provide 2,000 square feet (190 m^{2}) of program space. In 1996, the City gave this building and the other half of the 600 block of First Street to the Sciencenter for $1 following an intense year-long lobbying effort by executive director Charlie Trautmann and Ithaca Common Council member Susan Blumenthal. In 1999, the Sciencenter launched a capital campaign to expand the Sciencenter to 32,000 square feet (3,000 m^{2}) to provide additional exhibit and program space, an early childhood area, and a discovery room. The campaign raised $5.5 million and the expansion project was dedicated on February 28, 2003, on the 20th anniversary of the Sciencenter's founding.

=== Advancement ===
With the museum expansion behind it, the organization could now focus on planning for future educational impact and building systems to support these strategic plans. The museum began to implement development, membership, marketing, communications and public/media relations to advance the mission of the Sciencenter. Key priorities included: growing the annual fund, developing an individual giving program, raising funds for special projects, and growing the Sciencenter endowment.

== Guest relations and operations ==
Its Guest Relations and Operations team manages the front desk and operates the Sciencenter store. Volunteers continue to assist with many aspects of the operation, including serving as museum guides, assisting with member services, working on building and grounds maintenance, and delivering educational programs. With the help of volunteers, the Sciencenter organizes a number of free days at the museum and free community events.

== Educational programs ==
The museum runs a variety of programs: on-site and off-site, school-based and non-school-based. Educational programs include field trips, after school programs, summer camp, and floor activities. The museum offers education programs for all ages from toddlers through adults.

== Sciencenter exhibits ==
The mission of the Sciencenter is to cultivate a broad community of curious, confident, critical thinkers. The Sciencenter in Ithaca features 250+ fun, hands-on exhibits, educational programs, an outdoor science playground, a seasonal 18-hole Sciencenter Mini-Golf course, a Tidepool Touch Tank with live marine animals, an animal room, and an area designed for kids ages 4 and under with its own playground. A unique feature of the Sciencenter is the outdoor science park, featuring a series of interconnected ramps and structures containing more than two dozen playground-type activities related to physics, engineering, and geology. In 2008, the Science Playground was part of a major outdoor capital improvement project that – in the spirit of past community build events – brought together 275 volunteers from the community to enhance the park, and other outdoor learning spaces at the museum.

In 1997, the Sciencenter opened the Sagan Planet Walk, an outdoor walking scale model of the Solar System named in memory of Carl Sagan., a member of the Sciencenter's advisory board until his death in December 1996. The exhibition is 1,200 meters long and extends from the Commons in downtown Ithaca to the Sciencenter. An audio tour for cell phones and media players, narrated by Bill Nye, was added in 2003, and the Asteroid station, featuring a real meteorite, was added in 2009. In 2018 Augmented Reality features were added to a number of the stations.

== Traveling exhibitions ==
The Sciencenter's traveling exhibition program took on a national flavor in 1996 with the receipt of a major grant from the National Science Foundation. The Sciencenter was one of five founding members of a national exhibition collaborative for small museums called TEAMS (Traveling Exhibitions At Museums of Science), which received a $1.2 million grant to produce 5 separate traveling exhibitions. These were completed in 1999 and several are still on tour. The Sciencenter's contribution, FUN, 2, 3, 4: All About a Number of Things!, has 15 exhibits on measuring, graphing, counting, and estimating. The Sciencenter's first major solo NSF grant was called Tech City and led to the development of a 3,000-square-foot (280 m^{2}) exhibition that began a national tour in 2003. Over the following years, a number of other major grants were received, including two extensions of the NSF TEAMS grant in 2000 and 2004, additional NSF grants through Cornell University, and a number of NASA Education and Public Outreach grants. The Sciencenter's exhibits staff has grown considerably, and is managing and supporting a portfolio of traveling exhibitions currently including 14 exhibitions, eight of which were developed by the Sciencenter, with others coming from exhibition collaboratives who have contracted with the Sciencenter based on its growing reputation in exhibition tour management among small museums.

== Discovery Trail ==
The museum is a member of the Discovery Trail, uniting several of the Ithaca's museums and the Tompkins County Public Library.
