= Cayuga Nature Center =

Educational institution in New York, US

Coordinates: 42.518768°N 76.55493°W

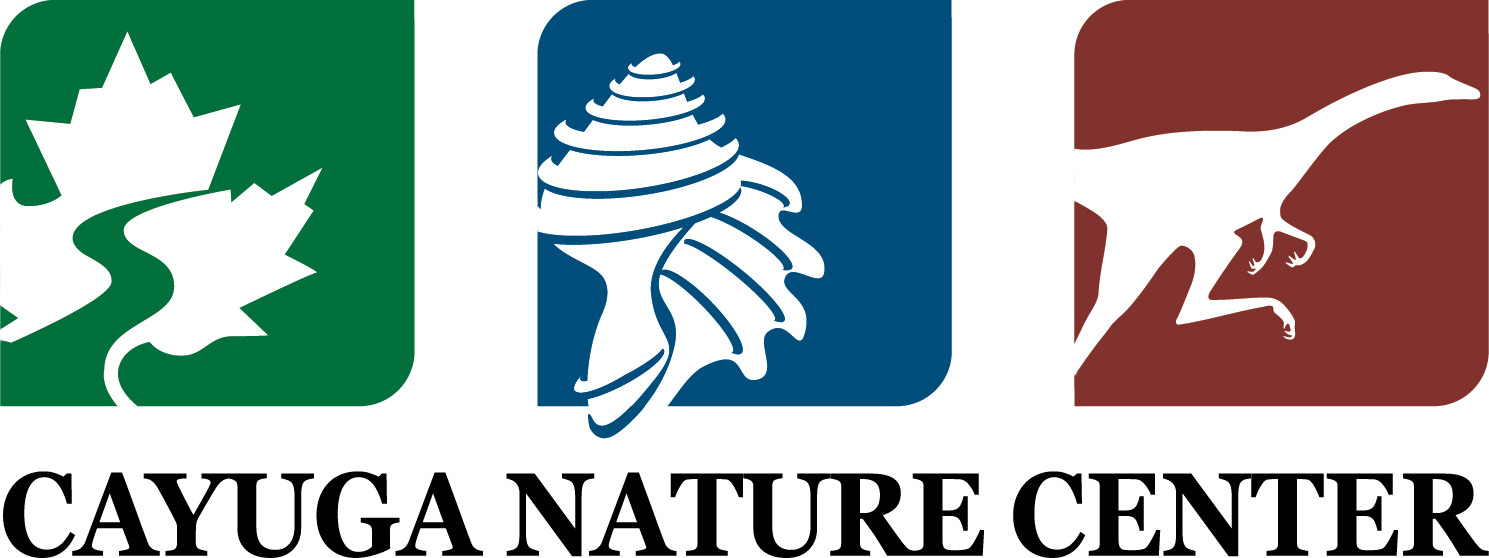
- Established: 1981
- Location: 1420 Taughannock Blvd, Ithaca, New York
- Visitors: 25,000
- Director: Warren Allmon
- Website: www.cayuganaturecenter.org

Ithaca Discovery Trail
- Herbert F. Johnson Museum of Art; Sciencenter; Cornell Botanic Gardens; Museum of the Earth; Cayuga Nature Center; Tompkins County Public Library; The History Center; Cornell Lab of Ornithology

The Cayuga Nature Center (CNC) is an educational institution addressing nature and environmental issues. It is located on the west side of Cayuga Lake in Tompkins County, New York.

== History ==
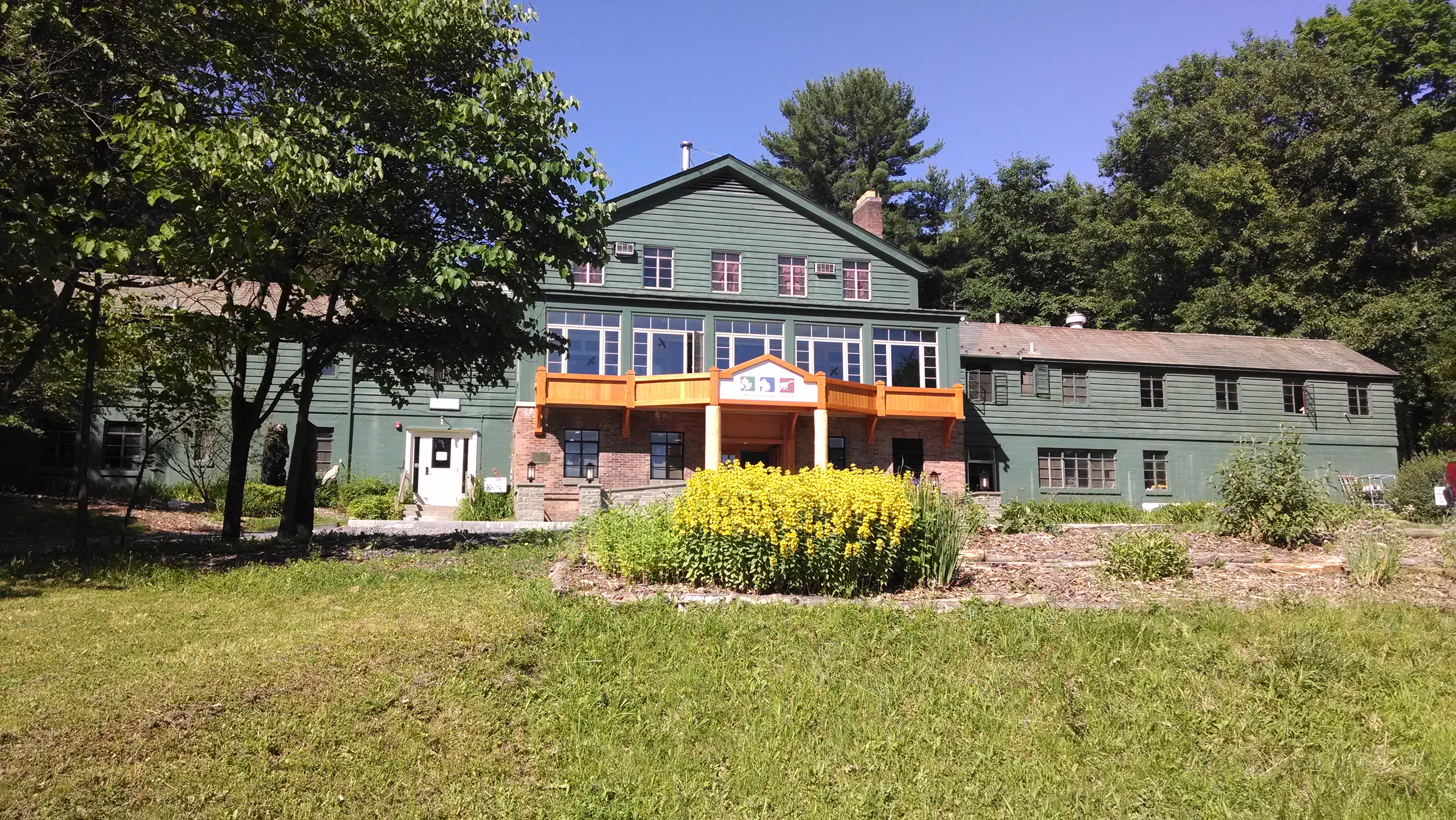
The Cayuga Nature Center Lodge today

CNC traces its history back to the Cayuga Preventorium, founded in 1914, which was a non-profit organization that provided a summer camp on the east side of Cayuga Lake for children exposed to tuberculosis. As tuberculosis cases diminished, the Preventorium sponsored the Cardiac Clinic to serve underprivileged children afflicted with heart disease. In 1936, Ernest T. Paine donated 75 acres of land on the west side of Cayuga Lake, at the current Cayuga Nature Center property, "for the health and welfare of the children of Tompkins County". Construction of the 10,000 sq ft (930 m^{2}) Cayuga Preventorium Lodge on the property was completed by the Works Progress Administration in 1939. The Preventorium summer camp ran until 1942, where diminishing cases of tuberculosis, competition from other summer camps, and staff reductions due to the Second World War forced the camp to close its doors. The lodge was listed on the National Register of Historic Places in 2021.

After the war, Cornell University leased the facility as housing for graduate students. In the 1960s, the lodge was reopened as a conference center to be used year-round. Under a new program sponsored by the State Education Department, the Board of Cooperative Educational Services (BOCES) began to offer the site for outdoor education programs. Based on the success of the program, BOCES, Onondaga Nature Centers, Inc., and the Ithaca City School District collaborated to open the Preventorium as a Nature Center in 1975. Dubbed the Cayuga Nature Center four years later, the center was incorporated as a private non-profit organization in 1981.

In January 2011, having experienced funding difficulties, CNC merged with the Paleontological Research Institution, with programs continuing at both locations.

== Facilities ==
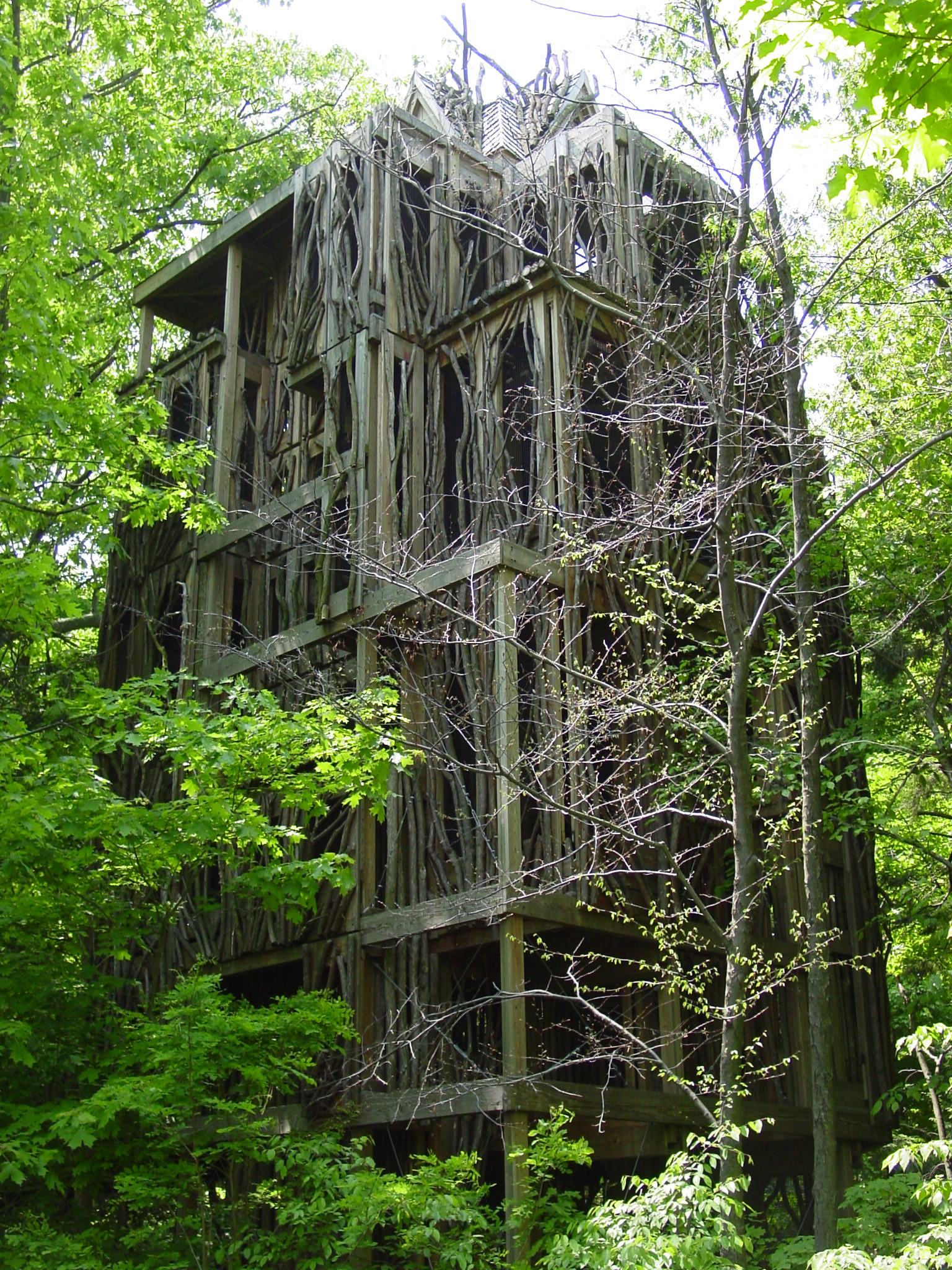
The six-story tree house TreeTops

The Cayuga Nature Center is located three miles south of Taughannock Falls State Park on the west shore of Cayuga Lake. The CNC Lodge is heated by a biomass furnace designed and installed as a Cornell engineering student project and features exhibits combining live, mounted, and fossil specimens with interactive stations to highlight the ecology and biodiversity of the Cayuga Basin. CNC's other facilities include Smith Woods, an old-growth forest; TreeTops, a six-story tree house built by the Ithaca High School class of 2000;, a zoological collection consisting of 30 animals; a seasonal Butterfly Garden, a turtle pond; and a 120-acre campus with five miles of hiking trails.

=== Smith Woods ===
Henry A. Smith Woods is a 32-acre old-growth forest in Trumansburg, New York. The forest was originally owned by New York City businessman Henry Atterbury Smith, who used it intermittently as a summer residence. In 1909, his sons left the property to the Village of Trumansburg to be used as a public park. Ownership of the forest was transferred to the Cayuga Nature Center in 2007, where it continues to be preserved and used as an educational and recreational site.

== Programs ==
CNC offered day summer and school's out day camps as well as year-round programs and classes focusing on environmental issues and natural history. Due to lack of funding, the future of the Cauga Nature Center and its parent company, PRI, the future is currently unknown.

Programs and classes are available for all ages and include animal encounters, and outdoor educational programs that cover survival skills, ecology, and geology, among other topics. CNC also offers seasonal programs on maple sugaring, making apple cider, butterflies and moths in the Butterfly Garden, and winter ecology.

== Discovery Trail ==
The Cayuga Nature Center is a part of Ithaca’s Discovery Trail, which features the center and seven other educational institutions in the area: the Museum of the Earth, the Cornell Lab of Ornithology, the Cornell Botanic Gardens, the History Center, the Johnson Museum of Art, the Sciencenter, and the Tompkins County Public Library.
