= Museum of the Earth =

Museum in Ithaca, New York

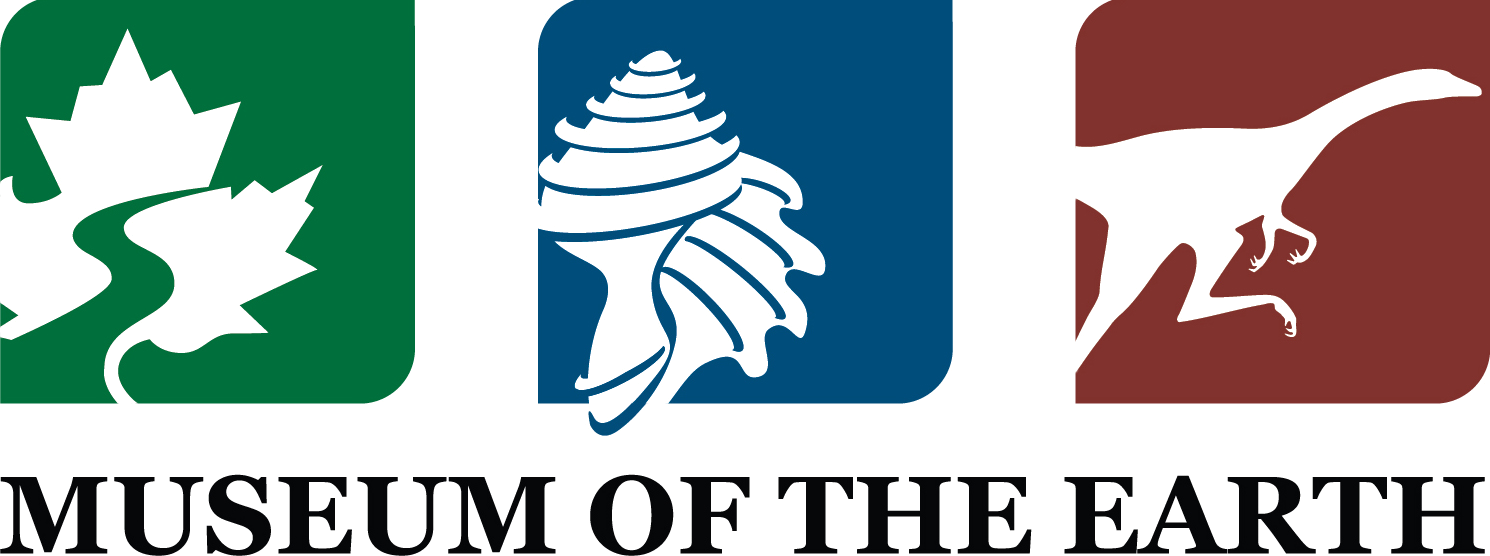

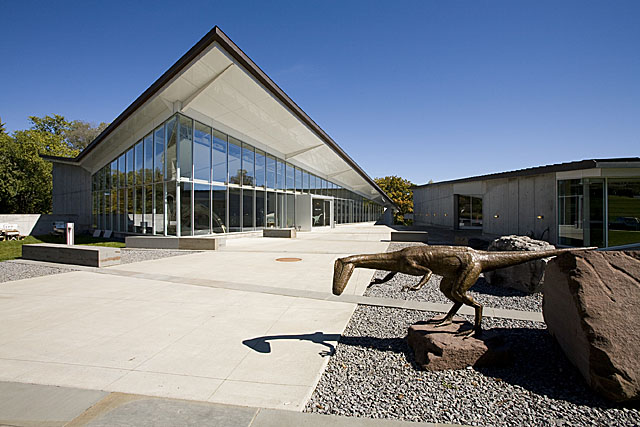

- Location of the Museum of the Earth in New York
- Established: 2003
- Location: 1259 Trumansburg Road, Ithaca, New York
- Coordinates: 42.466306°N 76.536203°W
- Visitors: 30,000
- Director: Warren D. Allmon
- Architect: Weiss/Manfredi
- Website: museumoftheearth.org

Ithaca Discovery Trail
- Herbert F. Johnson Museum of Art; Sciencenter; Cornell Botanic Gardens; Museum of the Earth; Cayuga Nature Center; Tompkins County Public Library; The History Center; Cornell Lab of Ornithology

The Museum of the Earth is a natural history museum located in Ithaca, New York. The museum was opened in 2003 as part of the Paleontological Research Institution (PRI), an independent organization pursuing research and education in the history of the Earth and its life. Both PRI and the Museum of the Earth are formally affiliated with Cornell University. The Museum of the Earth is home to Earth science exhibits and science-related art displays with a focus on the concurrent evolution of the Earth and life.

== History ==
In the spring of 1994, the PRI Board of Directors approved the proceedings for the initial planning of a museum to operate in accordance with PRI's mission. With initial state financial support of $2 million, PRI began the design process for the Museum of the Earth in January 1999. Construction of the museum began in 2001 and was finished by 2003, after several delays, costing a total of more than $11 million. The museum officially opened to the public on September 29, 2003.

The Museum occupies an 18,000-square-foot (1,700m^{2}) addition to the PRI complex on Ithaca's West Hill. The building was designed by New York architectural firm Weiss/Manfredi to be evocative of a gorge, with two wings divided by a central open-air court. The design for the museum won the American Institute of Architects's regional Excellence in Design Award and Honor Award for Architecture" in 2004.

In early 2025, it was reported that the Museum faced an imminent threat of closure due a withdrawal of donor support leading to an urgent budget shortfall. Through fundraising efforts, the museum's mortgage debts were fully paid off allowing the museum to remain operational.

== Exhibits ==
The museum's permanent exhibits include North Atlantic Right Whale #2030; Rock of Ages, Sands of Time; and A Journey Through Time.

=== North Atlantic Right Whale #2030 ===
North Atlantic Right Whale #2030

North Atlantic Right Whale #2030 was killed after becoming severely entangled in fishing gear in May 1999. Rescuers attempted to free her, but she fought them off, swimming hundreds of miles before ultimately succumbing to her injuries. Director Warren D. Allmon expressed interest in acquiring the skeleton after being notified on October 21, 1999, by the National Marine Fisheries Service that the 44-foot (13 m) right whale had been spotted dead off the coast of Cape May, New Jersey. PRI was informed that they could take the skeleton if they assisted with flensing the 30-ton carcass. Three days later, the bones arrived at PRI, where they were buried in a bed of horse manure for several months in order to remove the remaining flesh and oil. After cleaning, North Atlantic Right Whale #2030 was mounted on a steel armature in a greenhouse on-site. The museum building was left open on the northeast end so that the whale could be brought through for installation. In November 2002, the skeleton was transported into the building via crane and mounted in the atrium lobby.

By 2004, a permanent exhibit about the whale had been installed, funded by a grant from the Nelson B. Delavan Foundation. The exhibit includes baleen specimens as well as a short film by David Brown featuring footage of the unsuccessful attempts to rescue #2030 from the fishing gear that ultimately killed her.

=== Rock of Ages, Sands of Time ===
Rock of Ages Sands of Time mural

Rock of Ages, Sands of Time is a series of 544 mural paintings by artist Barbara Page. Each of the 544 11✕11" masonite tiles represents 1 million years, encompassing the last 544 million years of history, from the Cambrian Explosion to the present day. Each tile features life-size images of fossils from its respective interval of time, both two-dimensional and in low bas-relief, displayed on a background representing the common rocks and sediments of the time. The images are based on actual specimens from PRI's collections. The entire mural is approximately 500 feet long and is displayed along a ramp leading visitors from the lobby to the lower-level exhibits. A book contains reproductions of each painting and describes their scientific context in detail.

=== A Journey Through Time ===
A Journey Through Time leads visitors through four billion years of history, from the Big Bang to the present day, with an additional focus on the future as shaped by human effects and dependence on the Earth. The exhibit explores the scientifically technical areas of geologic processes, evolution, and biodiversity, as well as the cultural contexts of such understanding, and features a diverse selection of fossils from PRI's collections, including the largest complete fossil eurypterid ever found. The exhibit includes three main sections devoted to the Devonian of Central New York, the Triassic and Jurassic of Connecticut, Newark, and the Hudson Valley, and the Quaternary glaciation. Highlights include the Hyde Park Mastodon, the Discovery Labs, coral reef aquaria, a glacier exhibit, four audio-visual object theaters featuring short films narrated by geologist and Cornell President Emeritus Frank H.T. Rhodes, Steggy the Stegosaurus and Amelia the Quetzalcoatlus, and a garden that mimics the landscape of the northeastern United States during the Ice Age, with tundra vegetation, polished gravel, and glacial erratic boulders.

==== The Hyde Park Mastodon ====
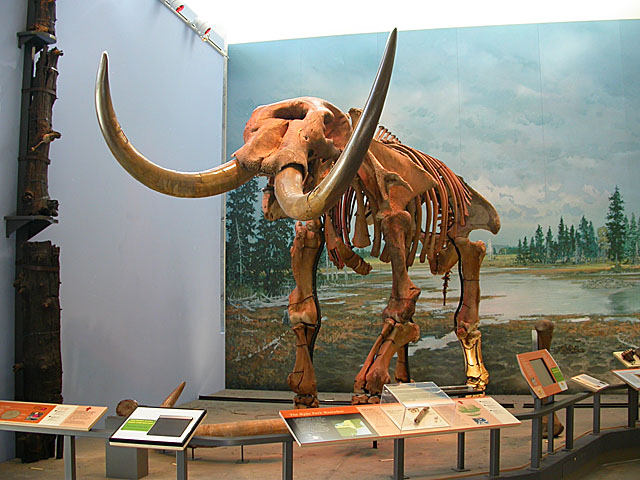
The Hyde Park mastodon

The Hyde Park mastodon was discovered in 1999 when a local family noticed some unusual-looking logs during a pond excavation of their backyard in suburban Hyde Park, New York. Upon further investigation, they were identified as the bones of an American mastodon (Mammut americanum). In June 2000, PRI staff along with volunteers from several organizations and universities began draining the site and discovered more mastodon bones. The excavation took approximately 6 weeks and more than 95% of the bones were discovered, including both tusks, the skull, and the major limb bones, making the Hyde Park mastodon one of the most complete and well-preserved skeletons of its kind ever discovered. The specimen was most likely an older male weighing as much as 10,000–15,000 pounds (4,500–6,800 kg). During the excavation, PRI recovered 22,000 pounds (10,000 kg) of matrix from the site and turned to volunteers to help sort through it in what is known as the Mastodon Matrix Project.

Post-excavation, the specimen was shipped first to the University of Michigan Museum of Paleontology, where it was studied and a cast of the bones was created, then to Alberta, Canada, where an armature for the skeleton was assembled. In September 2003, the Hyde Park mastodon was put on display at the Museum of the Earth.

==== Discovery Labs ====
The Museum of the Earth's Discovery Labs, which provide opportunities for hands-on learning and exploration, include the Prep Lab, where scientists can be observed preparing specimens for research and display; the Fossil Lab, where visitors can search for and identify fossils in local shale; and the Dino Zone, which is a dinosaur-themed play and learning area for young children.

==== Coral reef aquaria ====
The coral reef exhibit, located in the Ice Age section of A Journey Through Time, features Indo-Pacific and Caribbean reefs. Both aquaria were designed to be accurate and educational while simultaneously emphasizing environmental sustainability and conservation.

==== Glacier exhibit ====
The glacier exhibit, built to commemorate the Museum of the Earth's 10th anniversary, allows visitors to learn about glaciology and the impact of glaciers on the Finger Lakes region through an interactive walkthrough ice cave.

==== Steggy the Stegosaurus ====
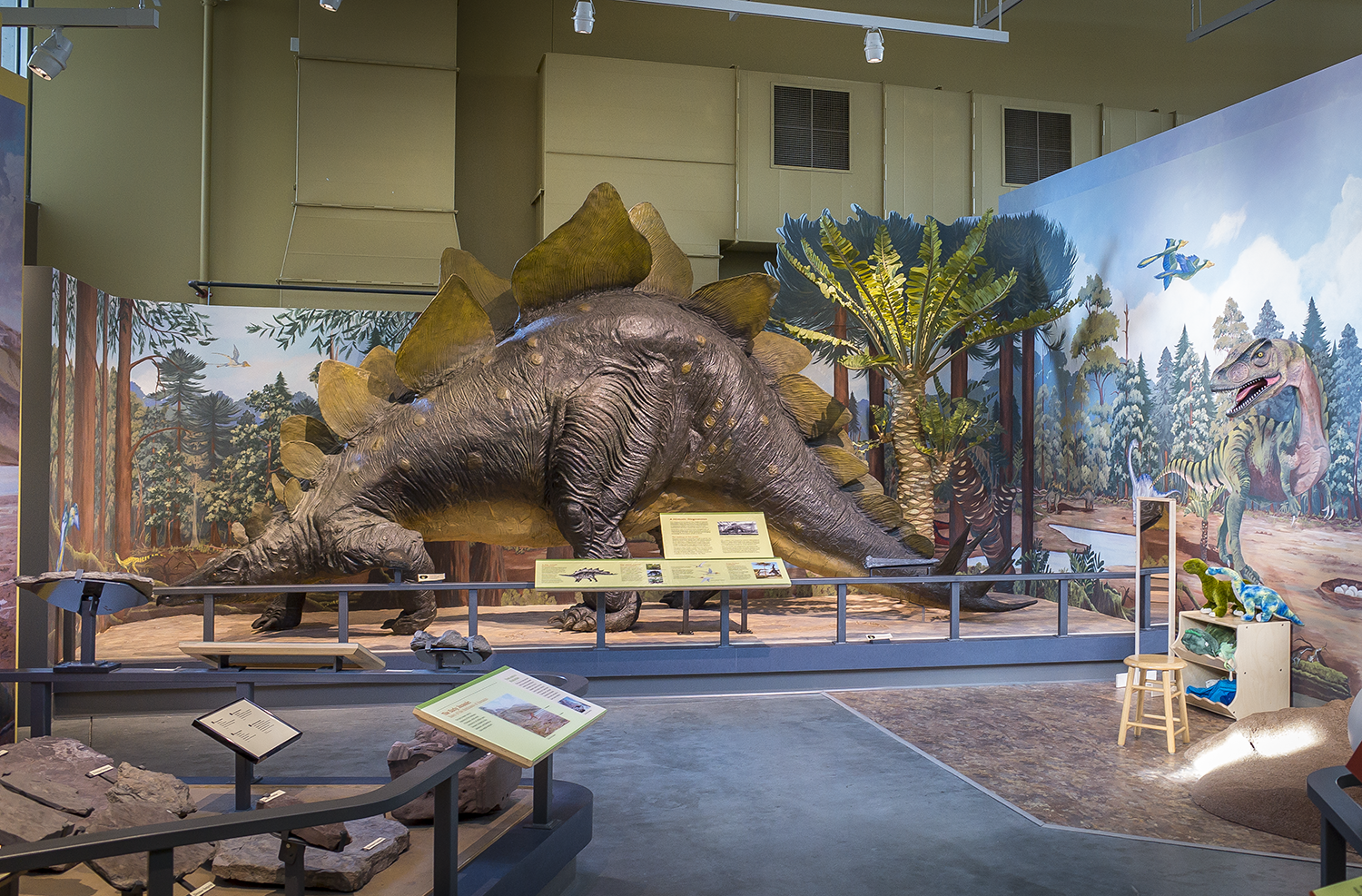
Steggy the Stegosaurus

Steggy the Stegosaurus is a permanent gift to the Museum of the Earth from the National Museum of Natural History in Washington, DC. The life-size papier-mâché model was originally constructed by Milwaukee Papier-Mâché Works, Inc. for the 1904 Louisiana Purchase Exposition and was displayed in the Smithsonian Institution for over a century. In 2015, the sculpture was restored and transferred to the Museum of the Earth. It currently resides next to the Dino Zone, in the museum's Jurassic area.

==== Amelia the Quetzalcoatlus ====
In 2016, Amelia the Quetzalcoatlus was permanently transferred to the Museum of the Earth alongside Steggy the Stegosaurus from the National Museum of Natural History. The model pterosaur was named in honor of Amelia Earhart after a monthlong naming competition during its installation and currently resides alongside Steggy in the Jurassic area of A Journey Through Time.

== Educational Programs ==
The Museum of the Earth aims for a broad audience, with features intended to appeal to both children and adults, scientists and non-scientists. As part of its association with Cornell University, the museum also offers resources for educators.

== Cecil A. Physis ==
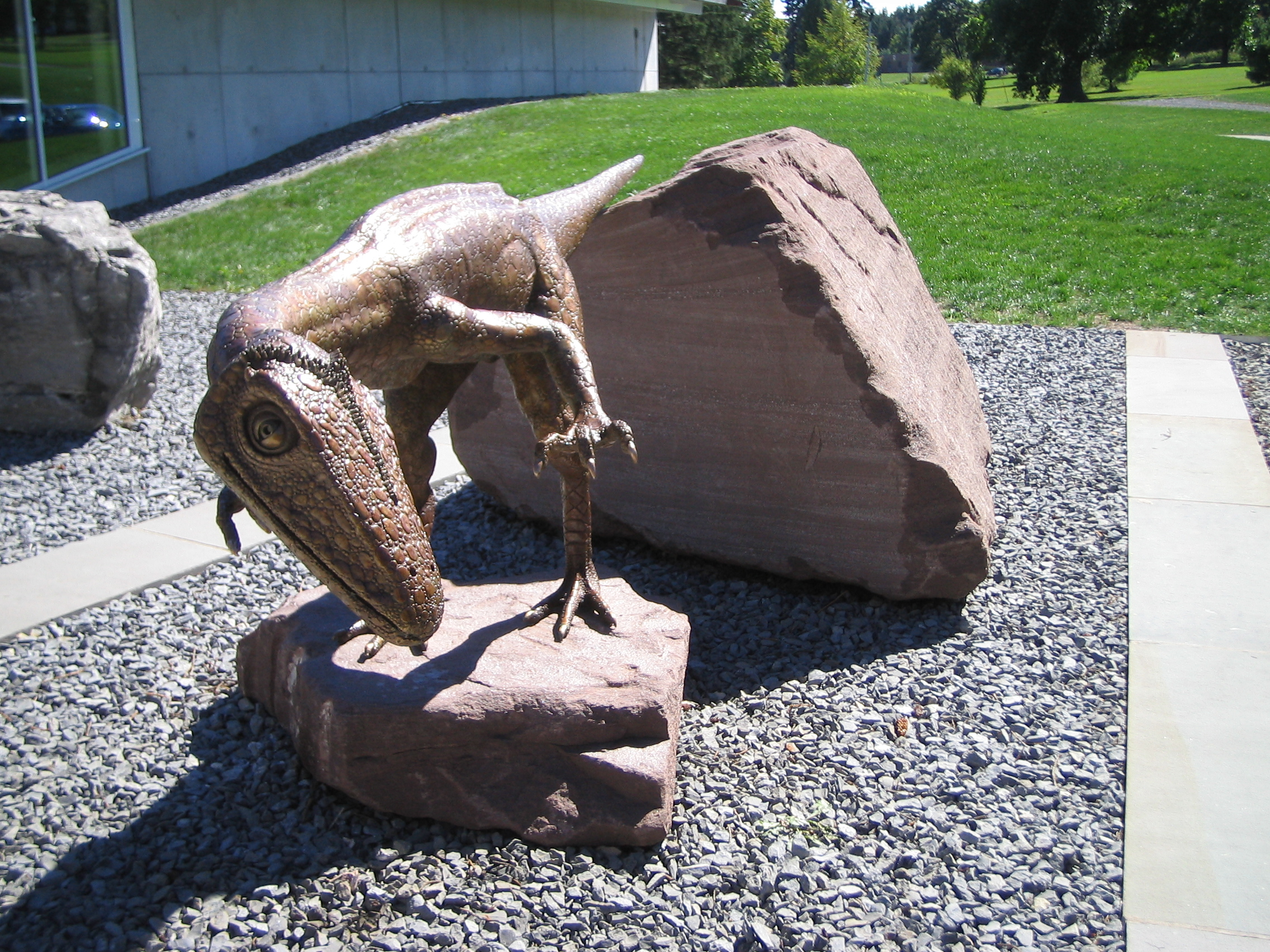
The statue of Cecil near the entrance to the museum

Cecil A. Physis, a Coelophysis, is the Museum of the Earth's official mascot. A bronze, life-size statue of Cecil, created by Brazilian sculptor Yure Berkley Lima de Alenca, can be seen near the museum's entrance. Dinosaur fossils in the Central New York region are rare, the only known ones being small footprints attributed to Coelophysis, so the species is said to be “New York’s only known dinosaur.” A stylized running Coelophysis features prominently on the logos of PRI and the Museum of the Earth. The museum's collections also include three Coelophysis footprints preserved in slabs of rock.

== Discovery Trail ==
The Museum of the Earth is part of Ithaca's Discovery Trail, which features the museum and seven other educational institutions in the area: the Cayuga Nature Center, the Cornell Lab of Ornithology, the Cornell Botanic Gardens, the History Center, the Johnson Museum of Art, the Sciencenter, and the Tompkins County Public Library. The Discovery Trail was established in 1999.
