= Herbert F. Johnson Museum of Art =

Museum in Ithaca, New York

Coordinates: 42.45084°N 76.486463°W

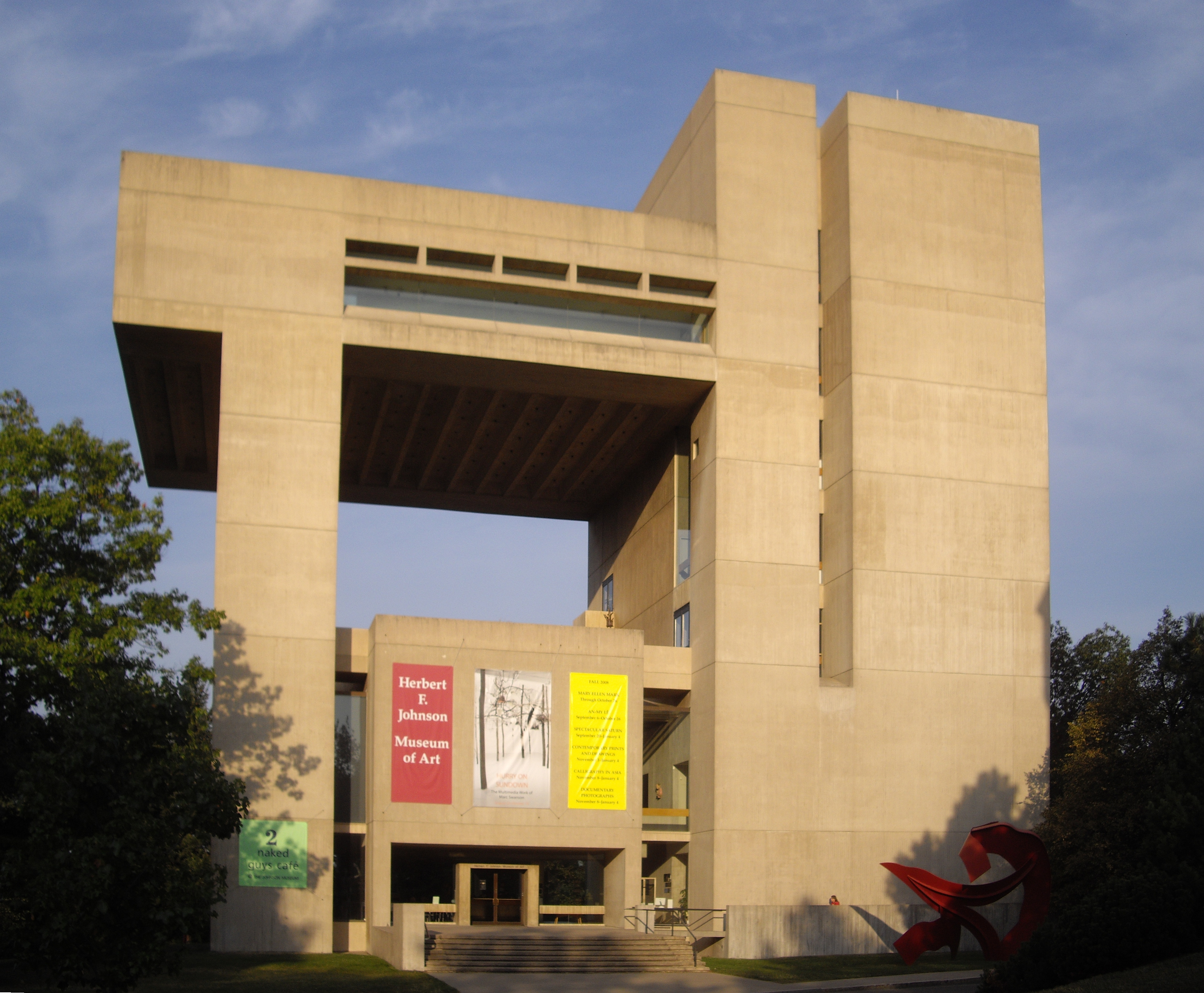
- Established: 1973
- Location: Central & University Avenues, Ithaca, New York
- Visitors: 80,000
- Website: museum.cornell.edu

Ithaca Discovery Trail
- Herbert F. Johnson Museum of Art; Sciencenter; Cornell Botanic Gardens; Museum of the Earth; Cayuga Nature Center; Tompkins County Public Library; The History Center; Cornell Lab of Ornithology

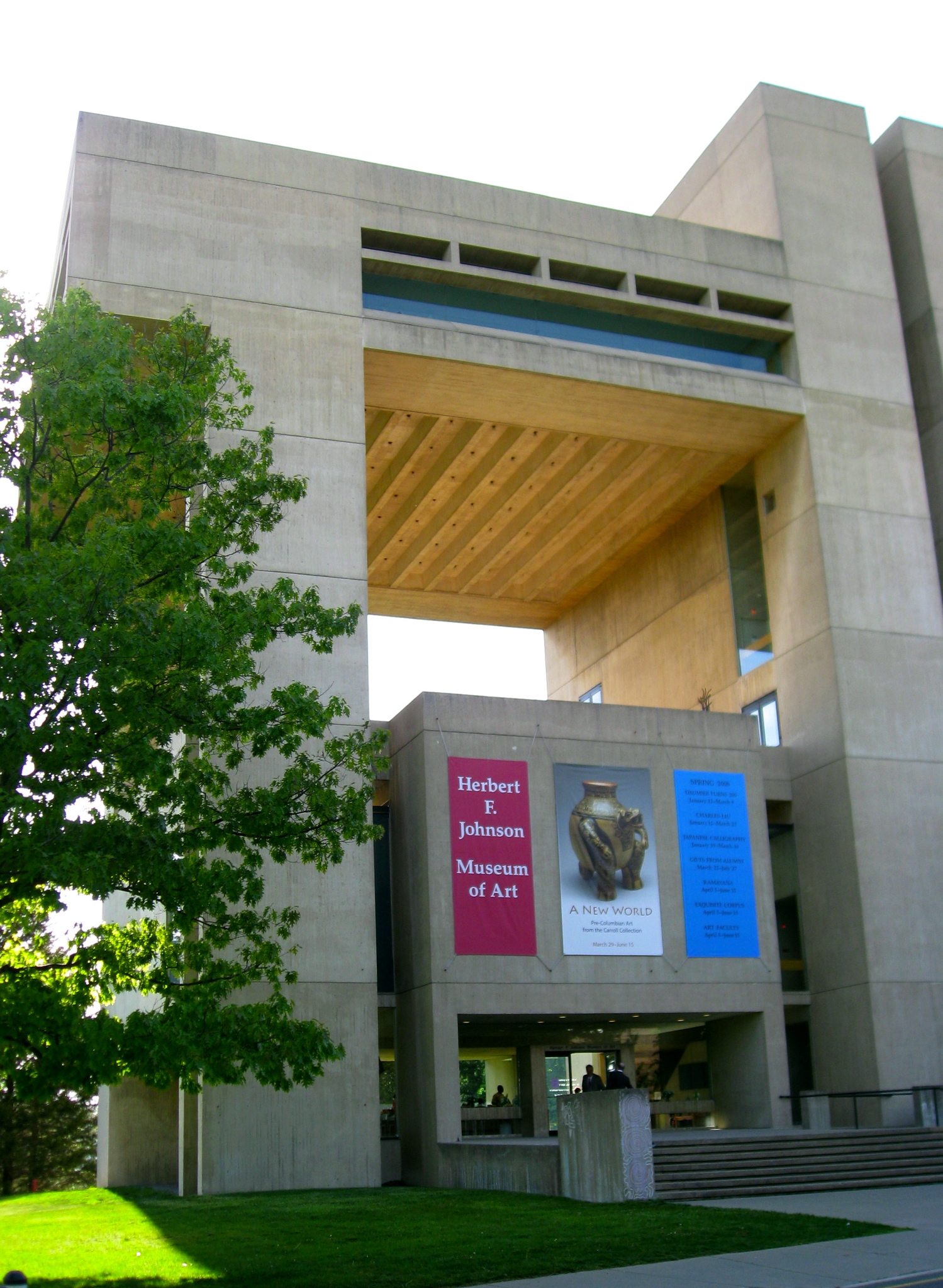
Herbert F. Johnson Museum of Art

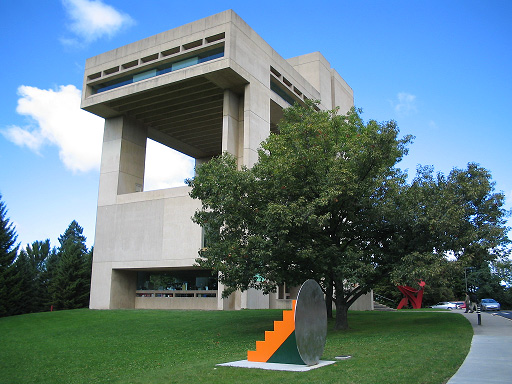
The Johnson Museum of Art, South elevation

The Herbert F. Johnson Museum of Art ("The Johnson Museum") is an art museum located on the northwest corner of the Arts Quad on the main campus of Cornell University in Ithaca, New York. Built in 1973, its collection includes more than 40,000 works in the permanent collection, which spans six millennia and encompasses art from most world cultures. It was designed by architect I.M. Pei and is known for its distinctive concrete facade.

== History ==
President Deane Waldo Malott established the original University Art Museum in 1953. The A. D. White House was renovated to house Cornell's art collections. The current museum, constructed in 1973, is named after its primary benefactor, Herbert Fisk Johnson Jr., a Cornell Class of 1922 graduate, head of S.C. Johnson & Sons ("Johnson Wax"), and a former member of the university's board of trustees.

== Architecture ==
The Johnson Museum of Art was designed by architect I.M. Pei. It can be characterized by its fifth floor, which cantilevers over the open-air sculpture garden. It was designed so that it would not block the view of Cayuga Lake, and offers a panoramic view of the same from its north and west sides. It also houses a room for meetings on the sixth floor, which was used for many years by Cornell's board of trustees.

The unique location of the museum presented several architectural challenges; building space was limited, and it could not overwhelm the view of Cayuga Lake or the nearby Arts Quad. Moreover, it would sit atop the knoll where Ezra Cornell chose the site for his university, at the north end of the Stone Row of McGraw, Morrill, and White Halls. The design sought to visually terminate the north end of Library Slope. The resulting design was a narrow tower and a bridge, which two professors from Cornell AAP already in 1973 criticized as "meaningless". Klaus Herdeg, one of the critics, elaborated on his assessment years later, that "the building`s totemlike ambivalence of scale has encouraged popular interpretations of it as a gigantic throne, a monumental altar or a giant`s toy". Another notion of the sculptural architecture as a giant sewing machine came up at the groudbreaking of the additional wing to the museum in 2008.

The building was awarded the American Institute of Architects Honor Award in 1975. The building's design also appeared on the cover of Scientific American as an early example of computer graphics.

=== Extension ===
In 2011, the museum opened renovated spaces and a 16,000-square-foot extension inspired by the original plans drawn up by Pei Cobb Freed & Partners. The head architect was John L. Sullivan III, Cornell class of 1962. The 16,000 sq ft (1,500 m^{2}) project cost $22 million, including some renovations to the main building, and was funded by major grants from the National Endowment for the Humanities and the Kresge Foundation. The Asian art storage area was relocated from the center of the fifth floor to the lower level of the addition, making room for additional public gallery space on the fifth floor. An outdoor Japanese garden was created outside the extension.

In 2015, Cornell filed a lawsuit against Pei Cobb Freed & Partners for "architectural malpractice," citing an "inherently flawed and materially defective" design of the new wing. Cornell claimed the addition was "fundamentally flawed" and resulted in over $1.1 million in damage costs.

== Collections ==
The permanent collection consists of more than 35,000 works of art. Most notable is the George and Mary Rockwell Asian Art collection. Spanning from the Middle Ages to the 20th century, the European collection includes works by Albrecht Dürer, William Hogarth, Francisco Goya, Édouard Manet, Charles-François Daubigny, Edgar Degas, William-Adolphe Bouguereau, Henri de Toulouse-Lautrec, Otto Dix, Fernand Léger and Henri Matisse.There are also extensive holdings of American artists, including Evelyn Metzger, Georgia O'Keeffe and Andy Warhol, as well as members of the Hudson River School and the American Impressionists to contemporary art. The Collection of Prints, Drawings, and Photographs consists of more than 22,000 works, including works by Berenice Abbott, Robert Frank, Alfred Stieglitz, and Garry Winogrand. Its fifth floor houses the museum's extensive Asian collection. The permanent collection also includes works from Africa, pre-Columbian America, and Oceania, representing many eras.

== Education ==
Although for-credit classes are conducted by Cornell's academic departments rather than the museum, the museum does provide curriculum-structured gallery sessions for specific classes. It also hosts faculty-conducted gallery tours and course-related exhibitions. The museum also hosts thematic tours for local school student field trips. The Johnson Museum Club is a Cornell student group that promotes awareness of the Johnson Museum's facilities and collections. It hosts concerts, scavenger hunts and other events.

== Gallery ==
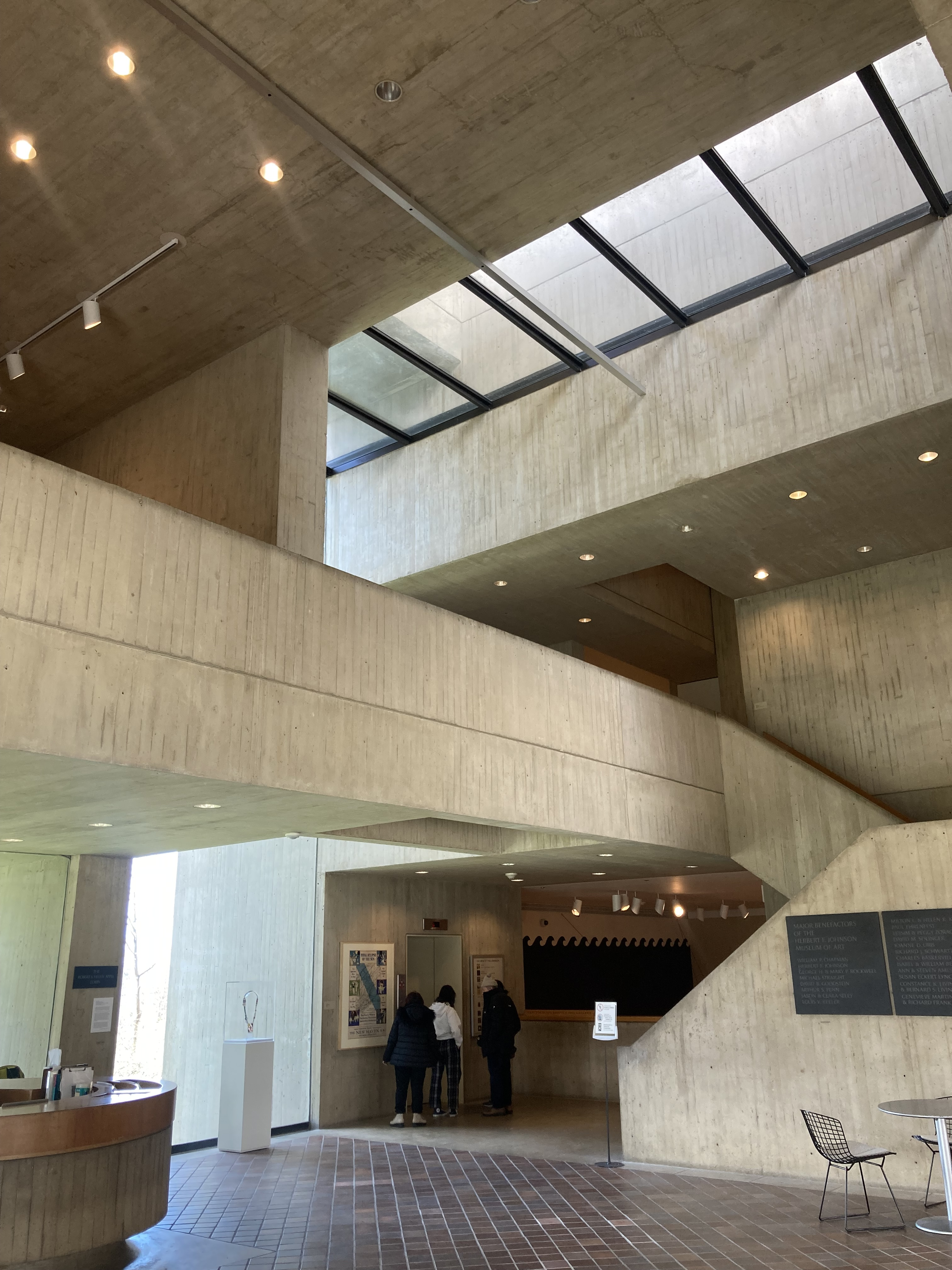
Interior view of the Main Lobby.

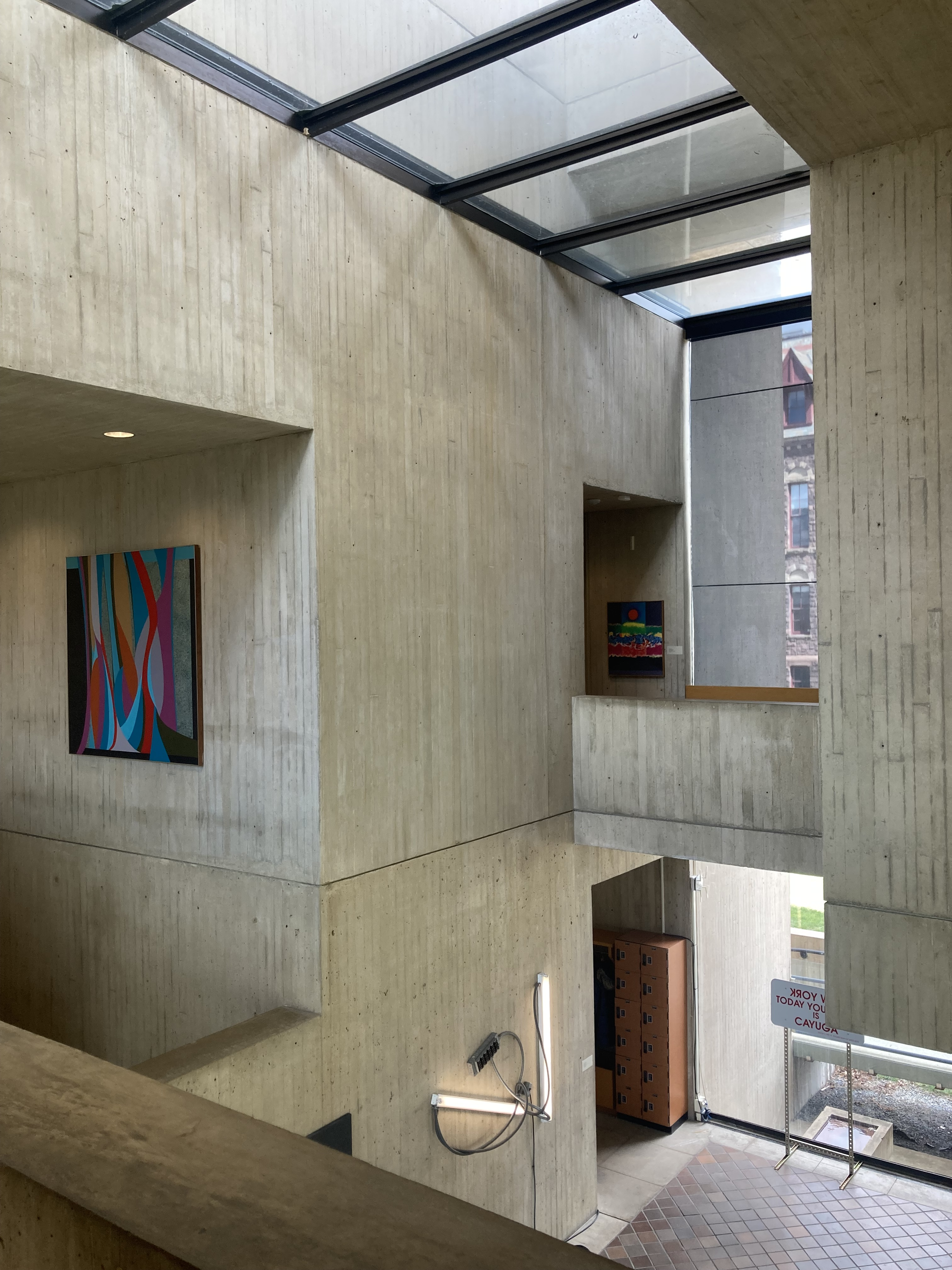
Another view of the Main Lobby.

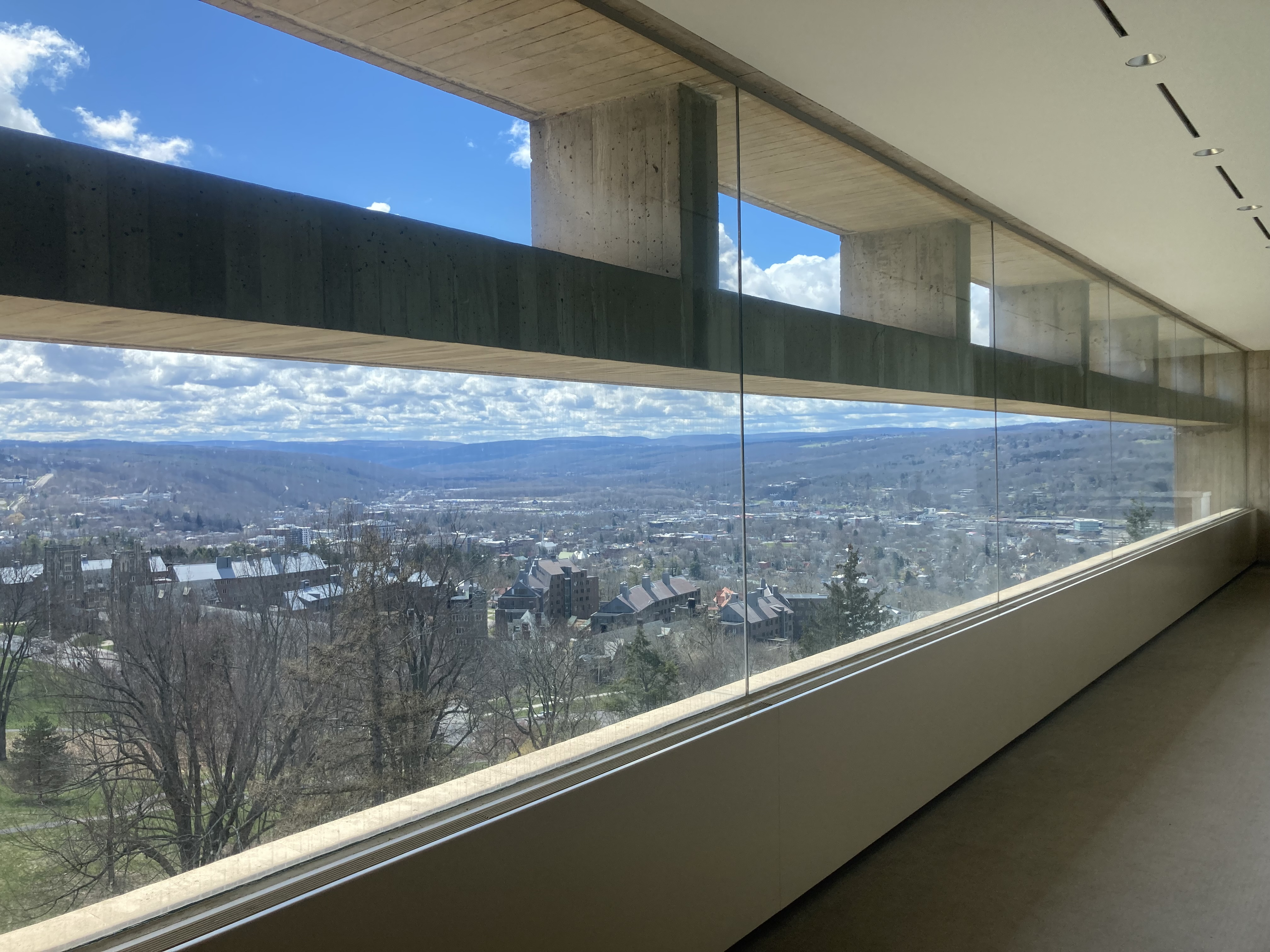
View of Ithaca from the fifth floor.

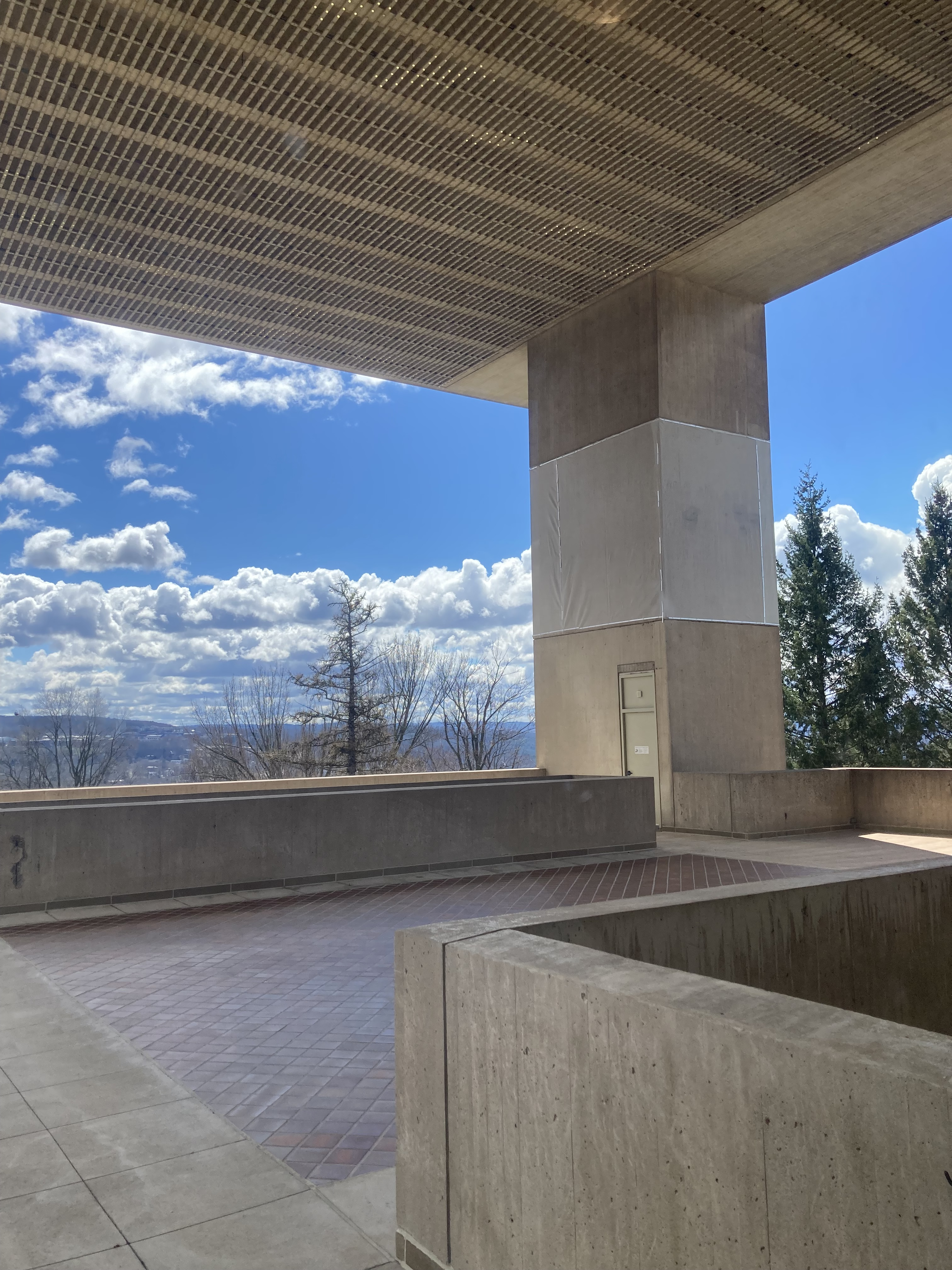
View of the open porch.

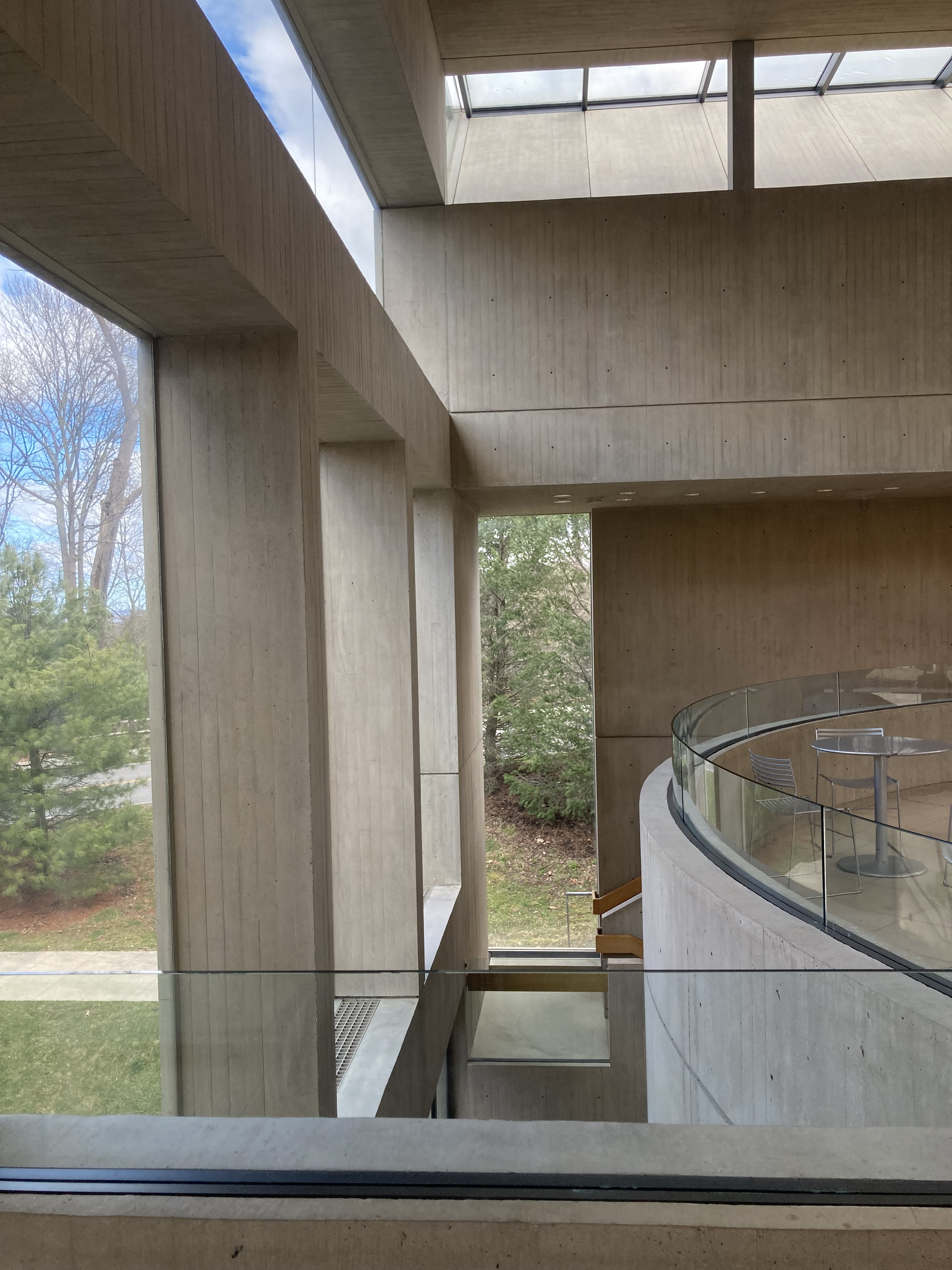
Interior of the Entrance Building.
