= Ithaca Discovery Trail =

- Formation: 1999
- Headquarters: Ithaca, NY
- Coordinates: 42°26′24″N 76°29′49″W
- Website: www.discoverytrail.com

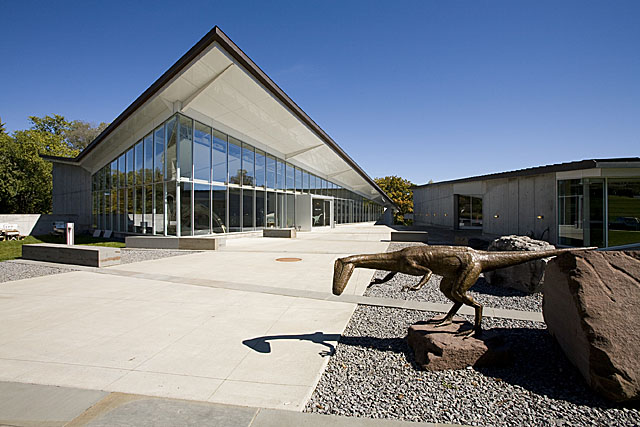
Museum of the Earth

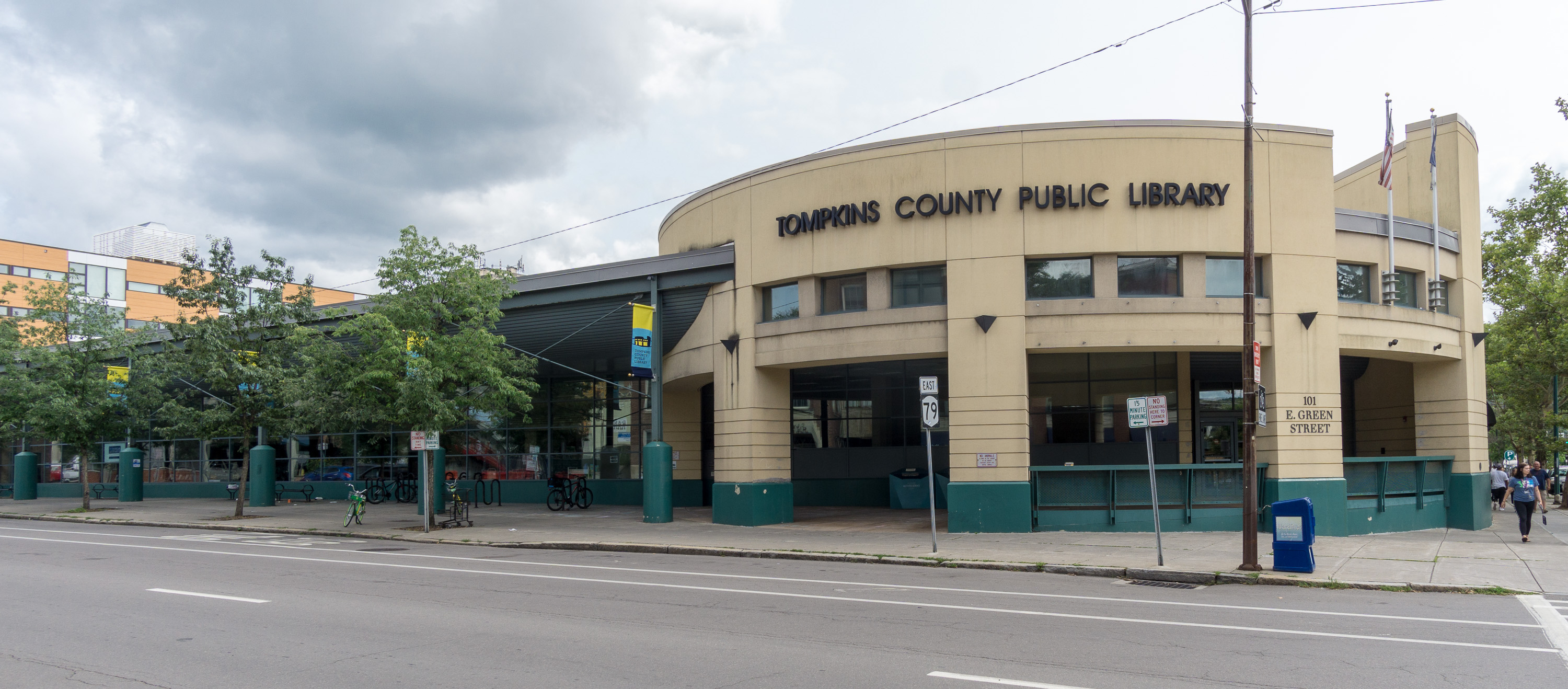
Tompkins County Public Library

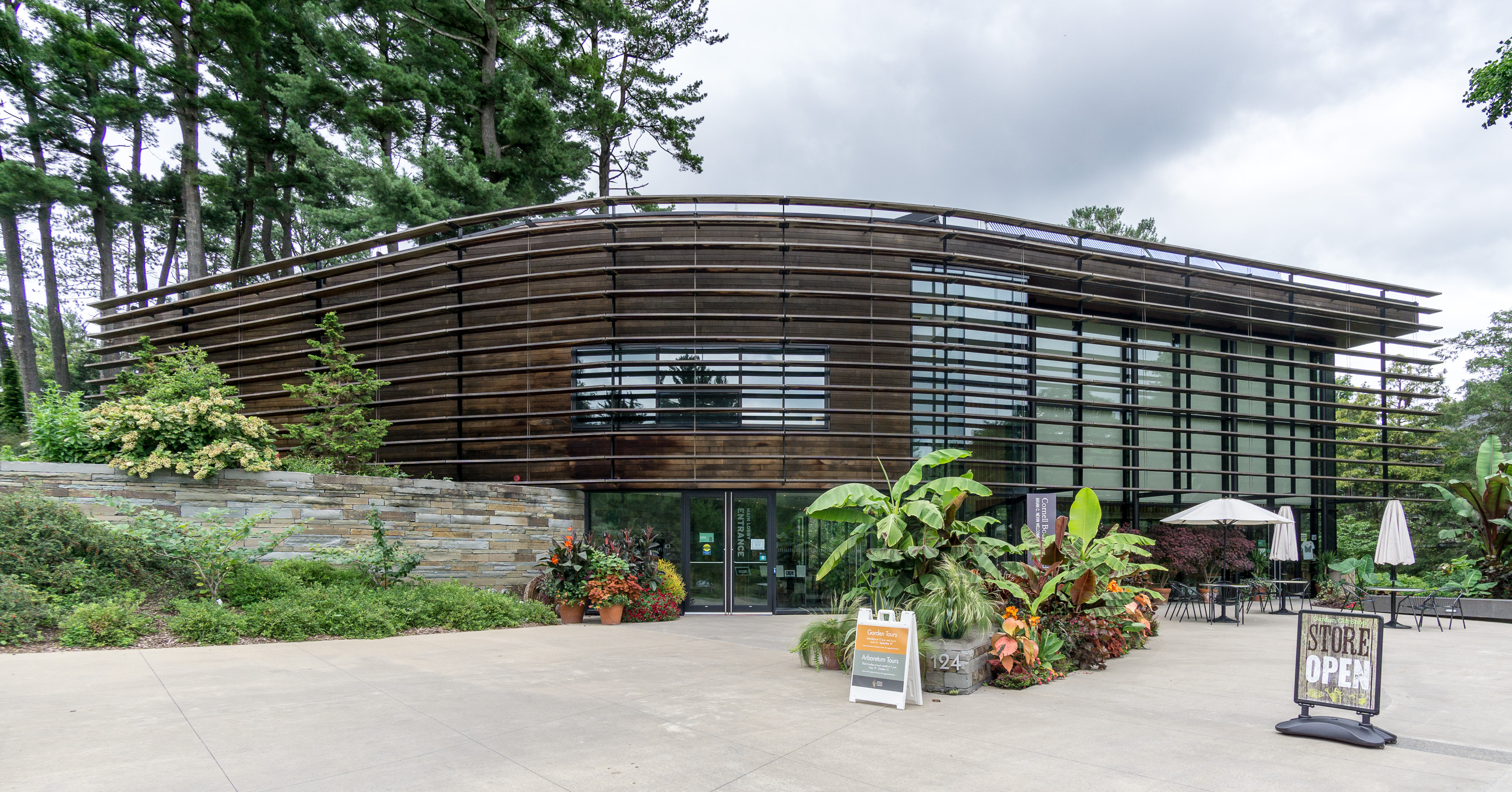
Cornell Botanic Gardens

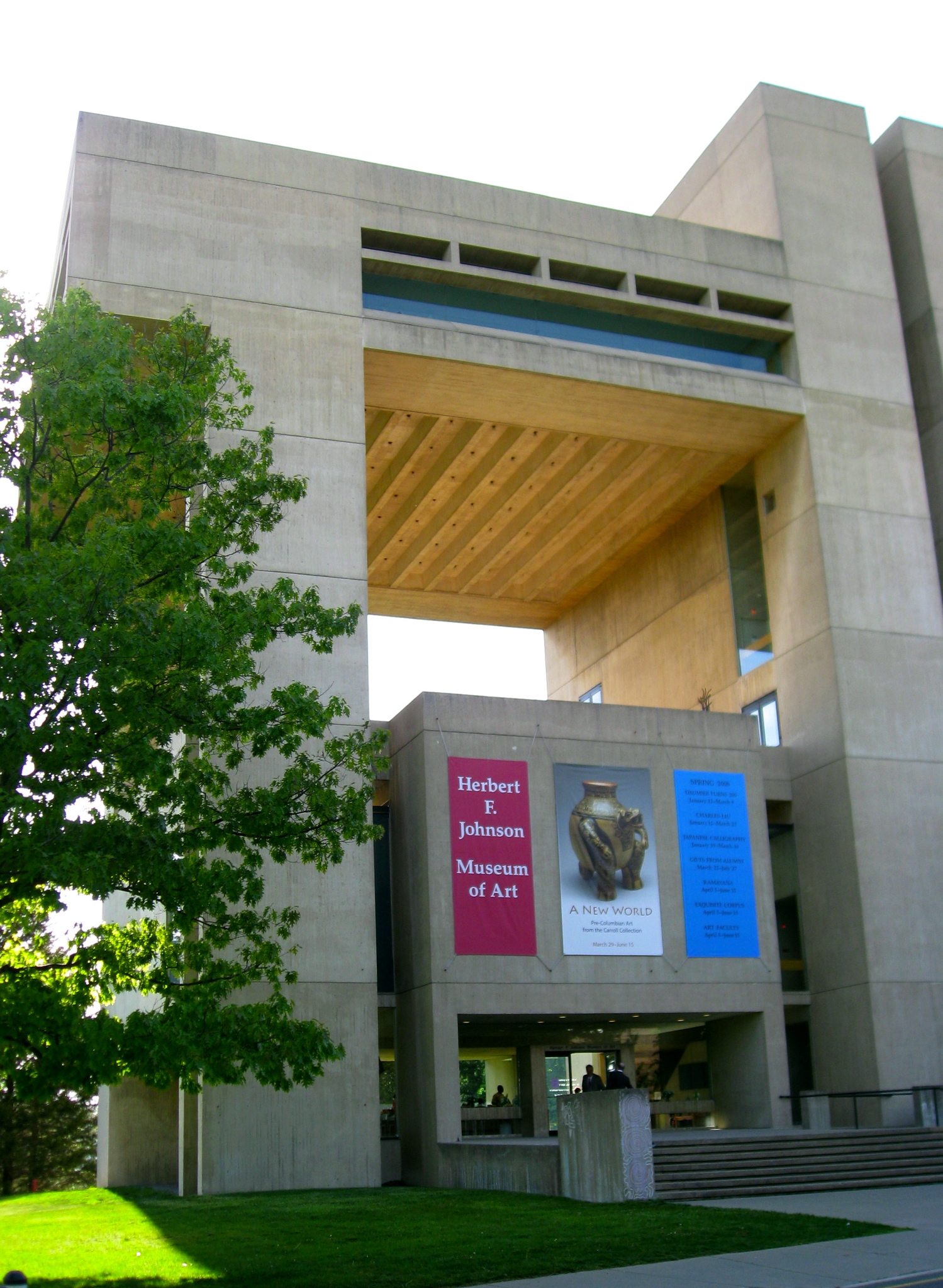
Johnson Art Museum

The Ithaca Discovery Trail is a collaboration among hands-on museums and the public library in Tompkins County, New York. Its member institutions are: Cayuga Nature Center, Cornell Lab of Ornithology, Cornell Botanic Gardens, Herbert F. Johnson Museum of Art, Museum of the Earth, Sciencenter, The History Center of Tompkins County, and Tompkins County Public Library.

== History ==
Prior to the founding of the Discovery Trail, museums worked together informally on joint promotions. In 1999, the Ithaca Discovery Trail was established using a grant to fund a part-time coordinator. It was incorporated in 2007 and gained a Section 501(c)(3) tax exemption in 2008.

In 2005, the Discovery Trail began the "Kids Discover the Trail!" (KDT) project with the Ithaca Public Education Initiative and Ithaca City School District (ICSD). KDT connects the eight ICSD elementary schools with the eight Discovery Trail institutions by providing curriculum-based field trips and instructional materials. About 2,900 students participate each year.

== Programs ==
The Discovery Trail cross-promotes the eight member institutions which form a "33-mile loop of exploration." The Discovery Trail promotes the "Ithaca Discovery Trail" as a distinctive brand that links the member institutions, and the Discovery Trail conducts the co-marketing effort among its eight members, which includes:

- collaborative programming;
- participation in community-wide events;
- a website;
- distribution of a common brochure;
- a biannual visitor survey, focus groups and analysis of visitor data (which is performed by Cornell's Survey Research Institute); and
- media press releases and advertising.

The Discovery Trail carries out joint events, programs, and exhibitions and works closely with the Tompkins County Convention & Visitors Bureau. The Discovery Trail also maintains a joint calendar of events.

The Discovery Trail is funded by the Tompkins County Strategic Tourism Board and by member contributions.
