= Weiss/Manfredi =

Architecture and urban design company

Practice information
- Founders: Marion Weiss; Michael Manfredi
- Founded: 1989
- Location: New York City, U.S.

Significant works and honors
- Projects: Tata Innovation Center at Cornell Tech; Brooklyn Botanic Garden Visitor Center; Museum of the Earth; Olympic Sculpture Park; Women in Military Service for America Memorial; Hunter's Point South Waterfront Park; Barnard College Diana Center; Krishna P. Singh Center for Nanotechnology
- Awards: American Academy of Arts and Letters Award for Architecture; Architectural League Emerging Voices Award; New York AIA Gold Medal of Honor; New York AIA President’s Award; Cooper-Hewitt National Design Award for Architecture Design; Veronica Rudge Green Prize in Urban Design

Website
- weissmanfredi.com

Weiss/Manfredi is a multidisciplinary New York City-based design practice that combines landscape, architecture, infrastructure, and art. The firm's notable projects include the Seattle Art Museum's Olympic Sculpture Park, the Brooklyn Botanic Garden Visitor Center, the Tata Innovation Center at Cornell Tech, the Singh Center for Nanotechnology at the University of Pennsylvania, the Museum of the Earth, the Embassy of the United States, New Delhi, and Hunter's Point South Waterfront Park.

== History ==
Marion Weiss and Michael Manfredi met in the late 1980s while working for Mitchel Giurgola Architects, LLP. In 1989, after both had left the firm and were working architecture professors, Weiss and Manfredi entered a design competition for the Women in Military Service for America Memorial at Arlington National Cemetery, which they eventually won, and founded Weiss/Manfredi. Prior to founding the firm, Weiss received her Master of Architecture at Yale University and her Bachelor of Science in Architecture from the University of Virginia. At Yale, she won the American Institute of Architects Scholastic Award and the Skidmore, Owings and Merrill Traveling Fellowship. In 2017, she was selected for Architectural Records's Women in Architecture Design Leader Award. Marion Weiss is the Graham Professor of Practice in Architecture at the University of Pennsylvania.

Manfredi received his Master of Architecture at Cornell University where he studied with Colin Rowe. He won the Paris Prize, was selected as a Cornell Fellow, and was awarded an Eidlitz Fellowship. Both Weiss and Manfredi are National Academy inductees and fellows of the American Institute of Architects.

Weiss/Manfredi has received an Academy Award for Architecture from the American Academy of Arts and Letters, an Architectural League Emerging Voices award, the New York AIA Gold Medal of Honor, the New York AIA President’s Award, the Cooper-Hewitt National Design Award for Architecture Design, and the Thomas Jefferson Foundation Medal in Architecture.

== Notable projects ==
Weiss/Manfredi's design was chosen for the Museum of the Earth in Ithaca, New York. The project was completed in 2003, and in 2004 won an American Institute of Architects (AIA) Excellence in Design Award and an Honor Award for Architecture.

The firm's design for the Seattle Art Museum's Olympic Sculpture Park, awarded by international competition, was completed in 2007. It was recognized as the 'Nature' category winner at the World Architecture Festival; it also won the I.D. Magazine Environments 'Best in Category' Design Award in 2008, a Progressive Architecture Award, multiple AIA Awards, an ASLA Honor Award, the EDRA Places Award, and was the first North American project to be awarded Harvard University’s International Veronica Rudge Green Prize in Urban Design. The firm's design for The Diana Center, a multi-use arts building at Barnard College won a national design competition and a Progressive Architecture Award. Upon its completion in 2010, the Diana Center also won the New York State AIA Best Building Award as well as a National AIA Honor Award.

In 2012, Weiss/Manfredi won a national competition to redesign the Washington Monument Grounds at the National Sylvan Theater. The work of Weiss/Manfredi also includes the Brooklyn Botanic Garden Visitor Center, the University of Pennsylvania Krishna P. Singh Center for Nanotechnology, Kent State University Center for Architecture and Environmental Design, the Tata Innovation Center at Cornell Tech, a Visitor and Reception Pavilion and Oncology building for Novartis, and Hunter's Point South Waterfront Park. In 2015, they were commissioned by the Department of State to design the United States Embassy in New Delhi.

== Exhibitions ==
The firm's work has been exhibited internationally including the "Groundswell" show at The Museum of Modern Art. Their work has also been exhibited at the Cooper-Hewitt Museum, the National Building Museum, Max Protetch Gallery, Harvard University, Yale University, University of Pennsylvania, Columbia University, the Van Alen Institute, the Architectural League of New York, Storefront for Art and Architecture, the Essen Germany Design Center, the São Paulo International Biennial, the European Landscape Biennial, and the Venice Architecture Biennale.

== Other activities ==
Weiss is the Graham Chair Professor of Architecture and tenured faculty member at the University of Pennsylvania and has also taught design studios at Harvard University, Cornell University and Yale University as the Eero Saarinen visiting professor. Manfredi is a Senior Design Critic at Harvard University, a founding board member of the Van Alen Institute, and a board member for the Storefront for Art and Architecture. He has also taught design studios at Yale University as the Eero Saarinen Visiting Professor, Cornell University, the University of Pennsylvania, Princeton University, and the Institute for Architecture and Urban Studies.

== Bibliography ==
- Weiss, M.; M. Manfredi (2000). Site Specific: The Work of Weiss/Manfredi Architects. USA: Princeton Architectural Press. ISBN 1-56898-208-9.
- Weiss, M.; M. Manfredi (2007). Weiss/Manfredi: Surface/Subsurface. USA: Princeton Architectural Press. ISBN 978-1-56898-733-0.
- Weiss, M.; J. Busquets (2008). Olympic Sculpture Park for the Seattle Art Museum:Weiss/Manfredi. USA: Harvard University, Graduate School of Design. ISBN 978-1934510049.
- Weiss, M.; J. Busquets; M. Mostafavi; E. Blau; C. Reed; I. Klein (2011). Deconstruction/Construction: The Cheonggyecheon Restoration Project in Seoul. USA: Harvard Graduate School of Design. ISBN 978-1934510315.
- Weiss, M.; M. Manfredi (2012). Pro Architect:Weiss/Manfredi. South Korea: Archiworld. ISBN 978-8957703809.
- Weiss, M.; M. Manfredi (2015). Public Natures: Evolutionary Infrastructure. USA: Princeton Architectural Press. ISBN 978-1616893774.
- Weiss, M.; M. Manfredi (2016). Converging Territories: Island Incubator. USA: Yale School of Architecture. ISBN 978-1945150241.
