= Tompkins County Public Library =

Public library in Ithaca, New York

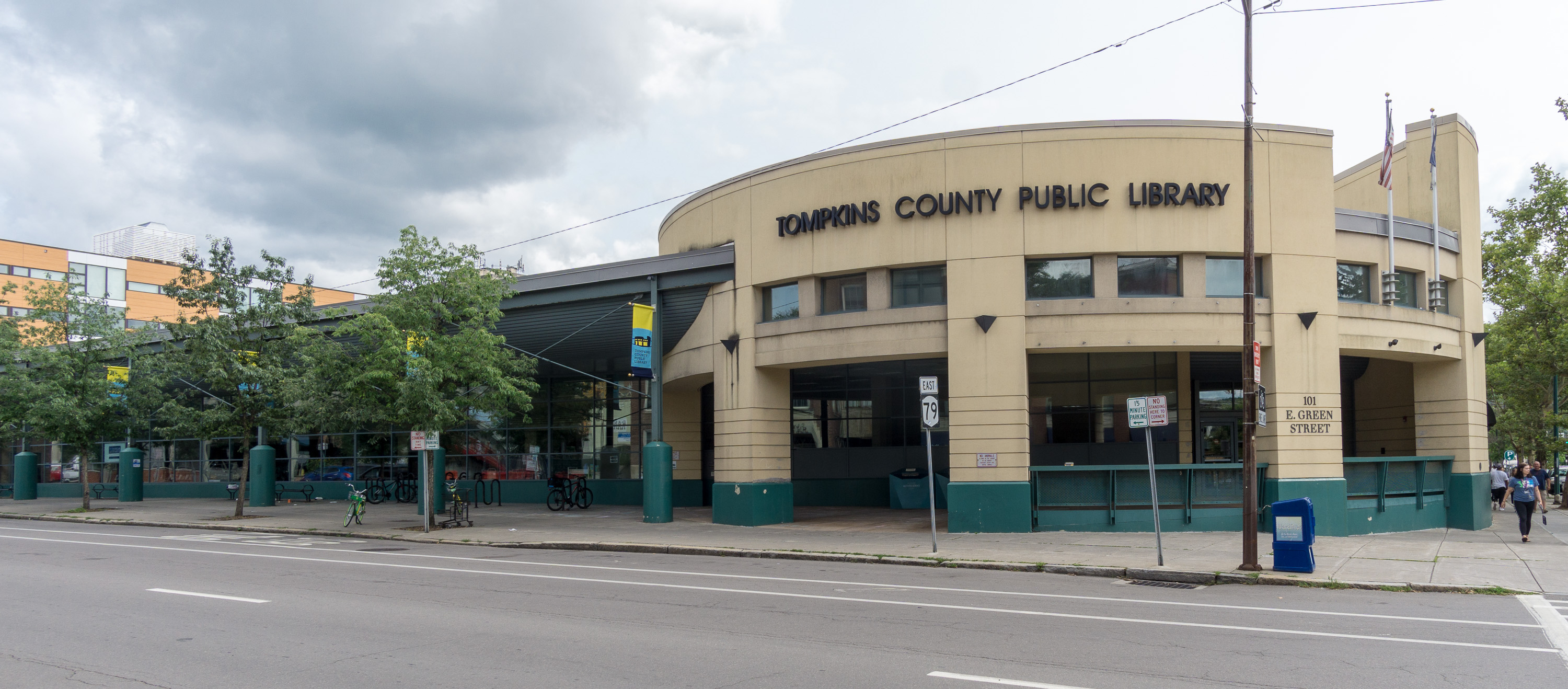
- Current location at the corner of Cayuga and Green Street
- 42.43824°N 76.49831°W
- Location: 101 East Green Street, Ithaca, New York
- Established: 1864
- Branches: 1

Collection
- Size: 148,824

Access and use
- Circulation: 702,395
- Population served: 105,740 (2002 Census)
- Members: 39,542

Other information
- Budget: $5.34 million (2026)
- Director: Emerson DeMeester-Lane
- Website: http://www.tcpl.org

Tompkins County Public Library (TCPL) is the public library for residents of Tompkins County, New York. The library has one branch which is located in Ithaca, New York.

== History ==
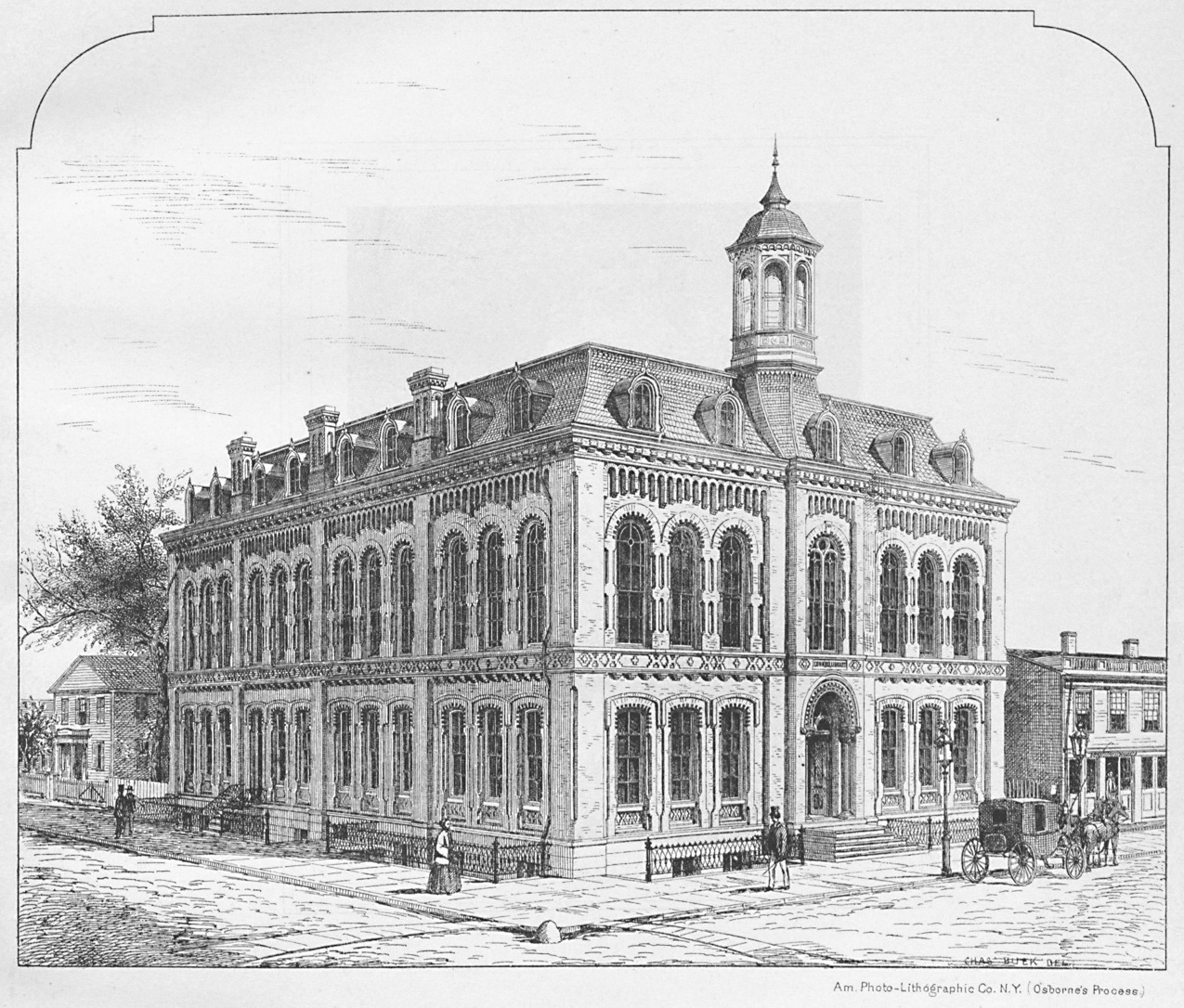
Cornell Free Library, Seneca and Tioga streets, 1864 to 1960.

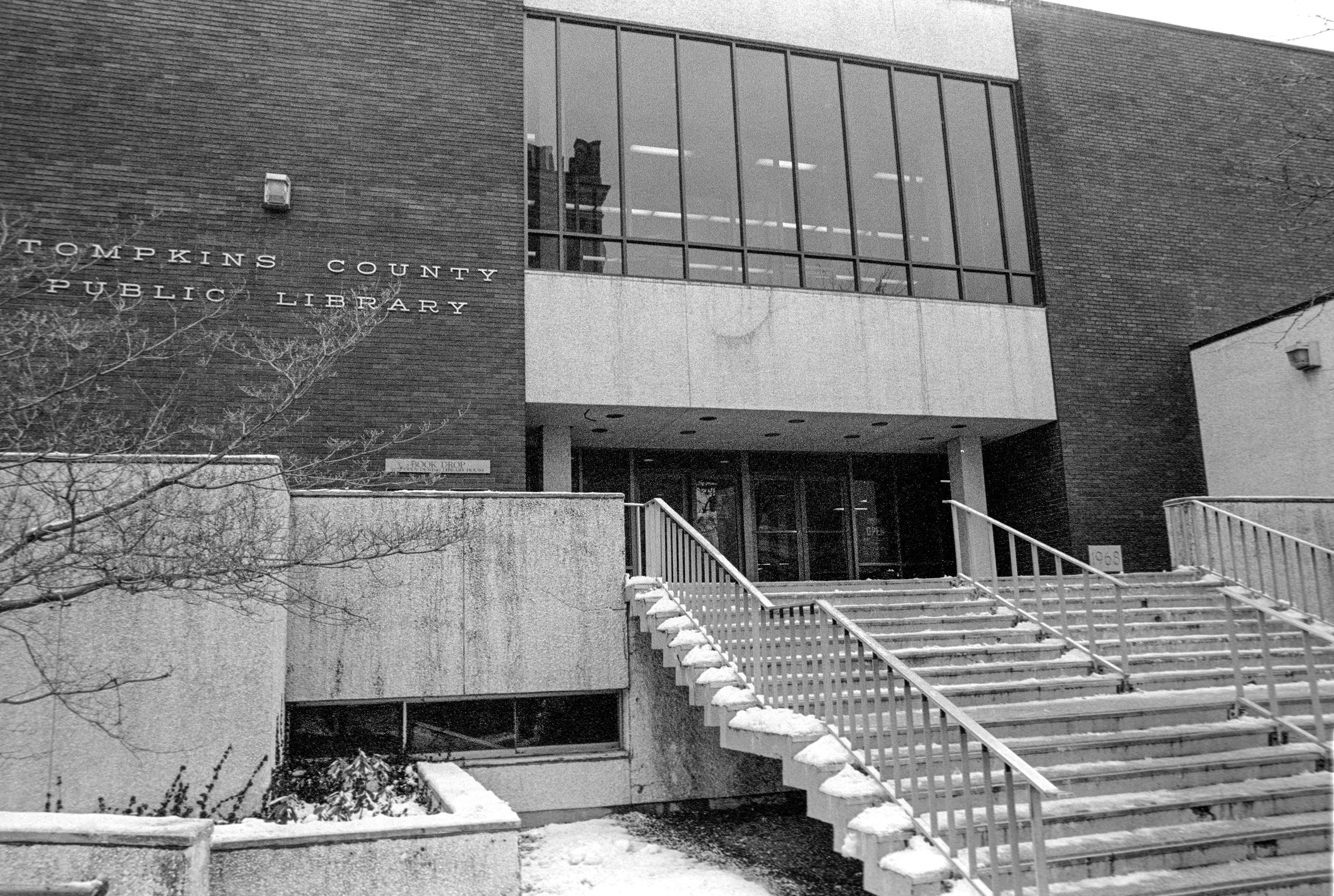
Tompkins County Public Library, 312 N. Cayuga Street, 1969 to 2000.

Ithaca's first public library was founded by Ezra Cornell as the Cornell Free Library and chartered by the New York State Legislature in 1864. Circulation began on March 4, 1867. It stood at the southeast corner of Seneca and Tioga streets from 1864 to 1960. Early classes and commencement of Cornell University took place in the library.

In 1967 the library was re-designated as the county's library when the county paid for the construction of a new $1.7 million building. This new building opened at 312 North Cayuga Street in February 1969.

By the 1990s, the library had outgrown the space at North Cayuga Street. In November 2000, the library moved to a renovated former Woolworths department store, which was double the size of the old building. This current building is located at the corner of Cayuga and Green Street (New York Route 79) just south of the Ithaca Commons. In November 2010 the library celebrated ten years in the current building. The Library began celebration for its Sesquicentennial in 2014. As part of that celebration, a mural of founder Ezra Cornell was hung on the exterior wall of the library building in October 2016.

== Description ==
The Library serves as the Central Library of the five-county Finger Lakes Library System and provides free and equal access to residents of Tompkins, Cayuga, Cortland, Seneca, Schuyler and Tioga counties.

The Library provides access to digital resources, including wireless internet access, databases and eBooks, as well as an extensive print collection. It also serves as the cultural hub of Tompkins County, providing museum quality art exhibits, opportunities for civic engagement and programs for children, teens and adults.

The Library's primary budget allocation comes from Tompkins County, with additional support from the Tompkins County Public Library Foundation and The Friends of the Tompkins County Public Library. In November 2014, The Tompkins County Public Library Foundation announced a $2.75 million campaign for a 21st Century Library in support of the construction of a digital literacy lab, a teen center, collection expansion and endowment building. Another $1.4 million was granted in 2016 for the creation of a teen center and renovations to the interior. Part of the Campaign for a 21st Century Library is the LEGO Library, which was led by Peter and Andrew McCracken. It features a 6' by 6' model of the library post-renovation.

Support from the Friends of the Tompkins County Public Library is funded by the Friends of the Tompkins County Public Library Book Sale. One of the largest events of its type in the United States, the book sale draws thousands to an Esty Street warehouse in May and October of each year in search of books, records, CDs and DVDs provided through community donations.

The Tompkins County Public Library is a part of the eight-site Ithaca Discovery Trail.

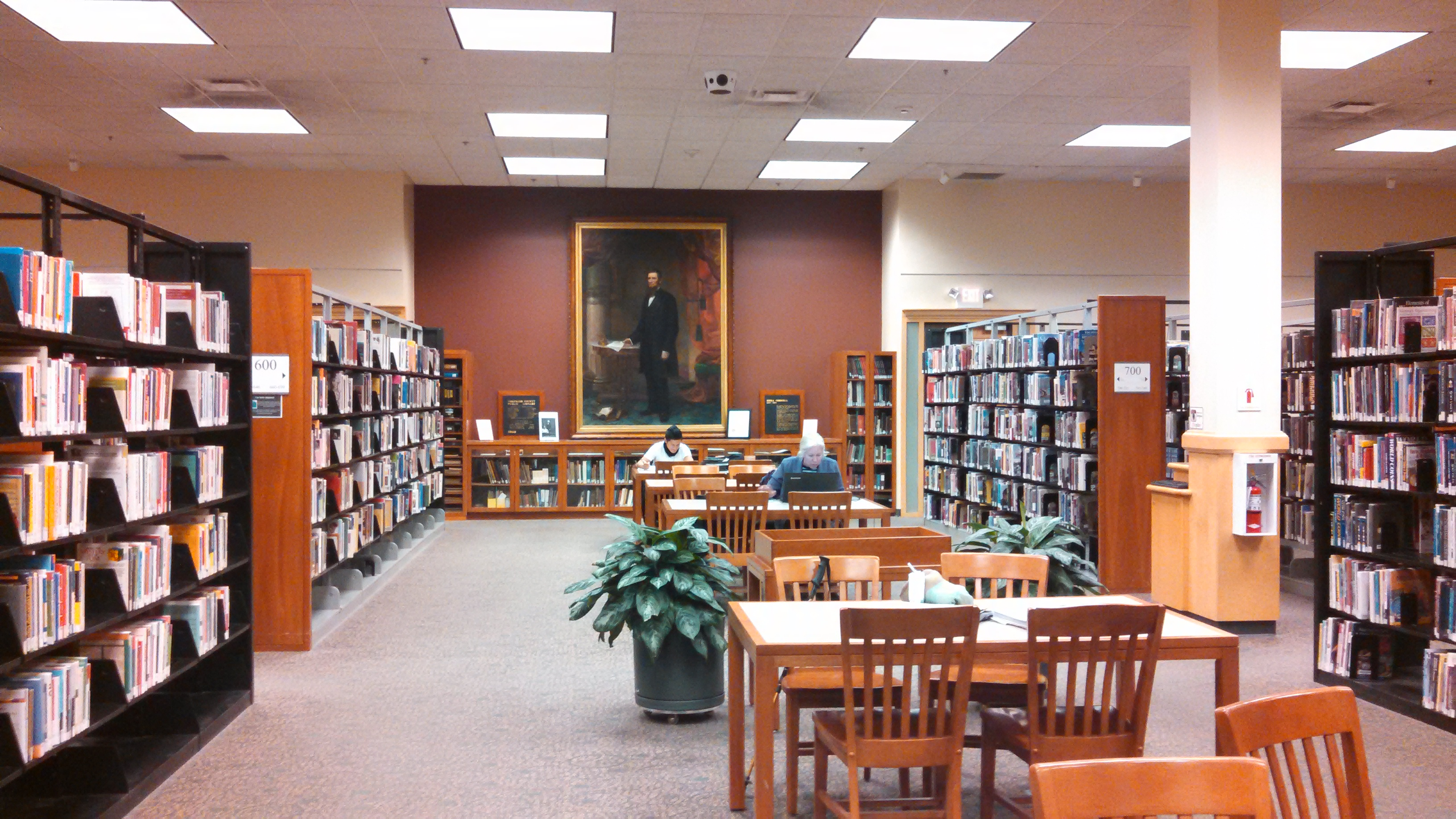
One of the reading areas of the library, with a painting of Ezra Cornell in the background
