= Stony Brook State Park =

State park in Steuben County, New York

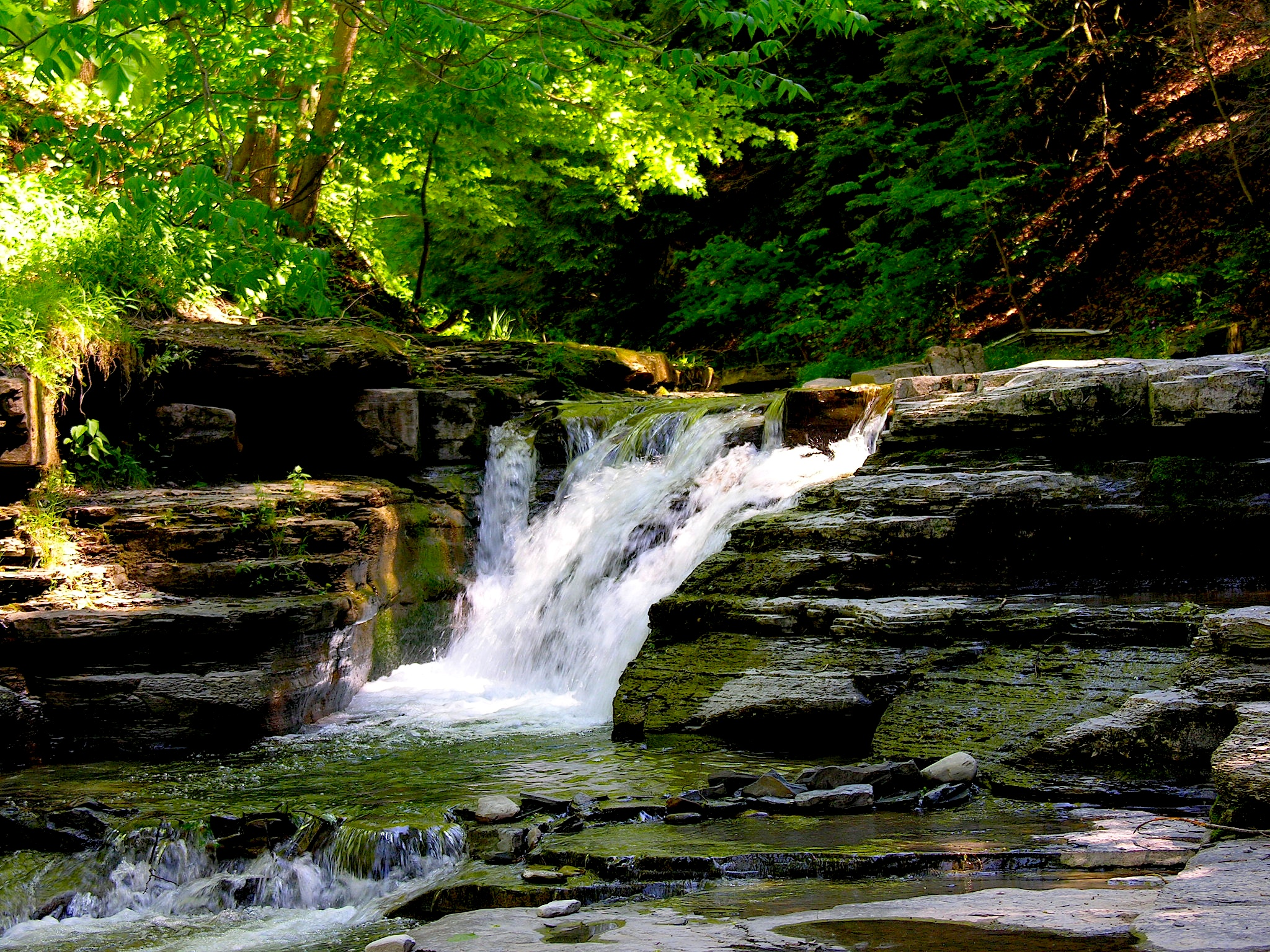

- Location within New York
- Location: Steuben County, New York, USA
- Nearest city: Dansville, New York
- Coordinates: 42°31′15″N 77°41′42″W
- Area: 568 acres (2.30 km^{2})
- Established: 1928
- Operator: New York State Office of Parks, Recreation and Historic Preservation
- Visitors: 164,536 (in 2014)
- Open: All year
- Website: Stony Brook State Park

Stony Brook State Park is a 568-acre (2.30 km^{2}) state park located in Steuben County, New York. It is located south of Dansville, Livingston County, New York Dansville, Steuben County, New York on New York State Route 36.

== History ==
Stony Brook became a summer tourist spot in the late 19th century, following the construction of a railroad in 1883. The resort fell into decline by the 1920s. New York state resurrected the area by buying the land and establishing the state park in 1928.

Stony Brook was enhanced in the 1930s by improvements constructed by the Civilian Conservation Corps and the Works Progress Administration. The footprint of these government programs is evident throughout the park in the form of hiking paths, bridges, picnic areas, and buildings.

== Park description and facilities ==
The signature attraction of the park is the eponymous brook, which is an example of small, post-glacial streams in the Finger Lakes area. The small creeks and brooks in this area cut through the Great Lakes-area escarpments following retreat of the ice age glaciers, creating deep, narrow gorges, with many waterfalls, which are uncommonly accessible.

Initially 250 acres (1.0 km^{2}), the park is now 568 acres (2.30 km^{2}). It offers two stream-fed swimming pools, picnic tables and pavilions, a playground, a nature trail, hiking, fishing and bow-hunting (deer), a campground with tent and trailer sites, and cross-country skiing. The park has an upper and lower entrance, connected only by Route 36 and trails.

As do some other parks in the region, such as Fillmore Glen State Park, Robert H. Treman State Park, and Buttermilk Falls State Park, the park features a semi-natural swimming pool, created by a small dam constructed in the lower reaches of the stream.

== See also ==
- List of New York state parks
- Glacial geology of the Genesee River
