= Schoellkopf Field =

Sports stadium at Cornell University, New York, United States

Coordinates: 42°26′38.71″N 76°28′43.16″W

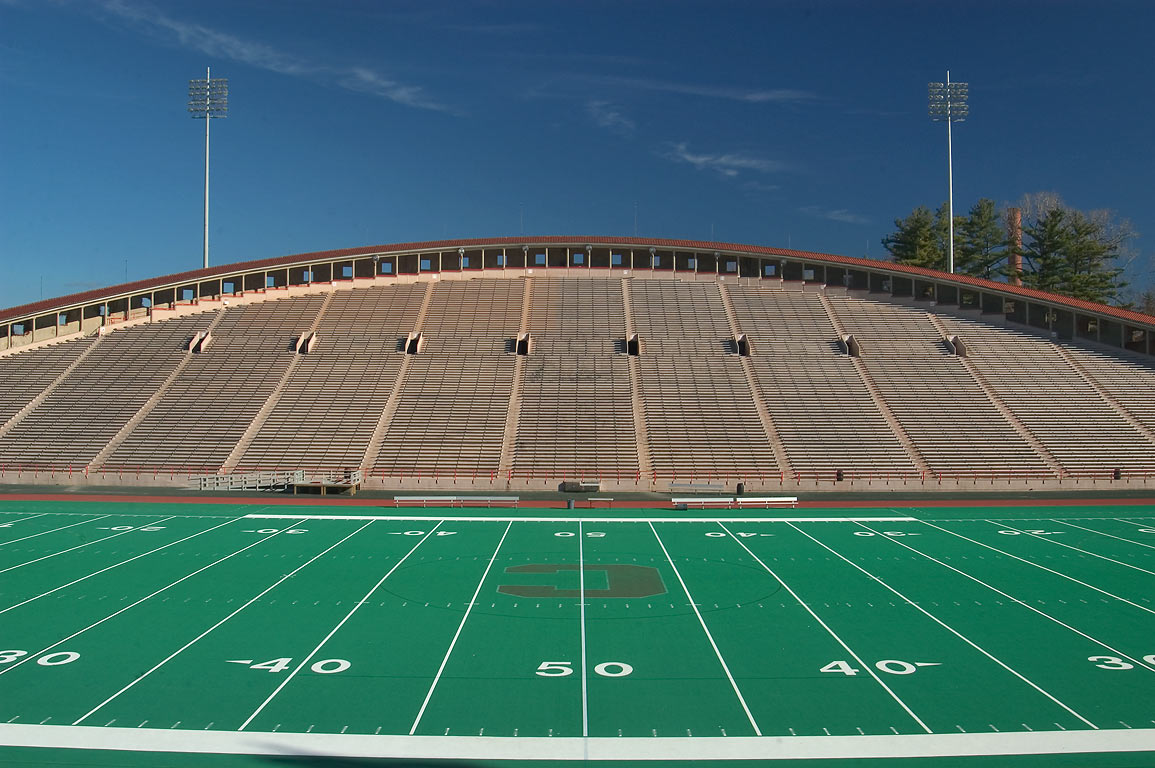
- View of the stadium in 2006
- Interactive map of Schoellkopf Field
- Address: 513 Campus Rd; Ithaca, NY 14850; Ithaca, NY; United States
- Owner: Cornell University
- Operator: Cornell University
- Capacity: 21,500
- Type: Stadium
- Surface: Artificial turf
- Current use: Football

Construction
- Opened: October 9, 1915; 110 years ago

Tenants
- Cornell Big Red (NCAA) teams: football, lacrosse

Website
- cornellbigred.com/schoellkopf-field

Schoellkopf Field is a 21,500-capacity stadium at Cornell University's Ithaca campus that opened in 1915 and it is used for the Cornell Big Red football, sprint football as well lacrosse teams. It is located just north of Cascadilla Creek on the southern end of the campus, which is next to Hoy Field and Lynah Rink; Schoellkopf Memorial Hall, adjacent to the stadium, contains the Robison Hall of Fame Room, the hall of fame for Cornell athletics.

== History ==
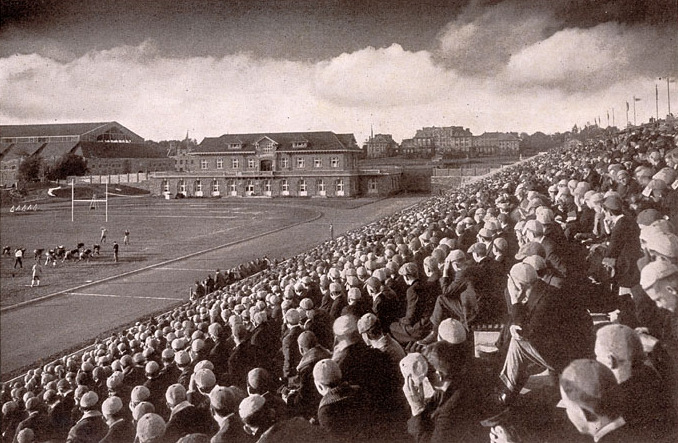
Cornellians cheer on the Big Red in 1919

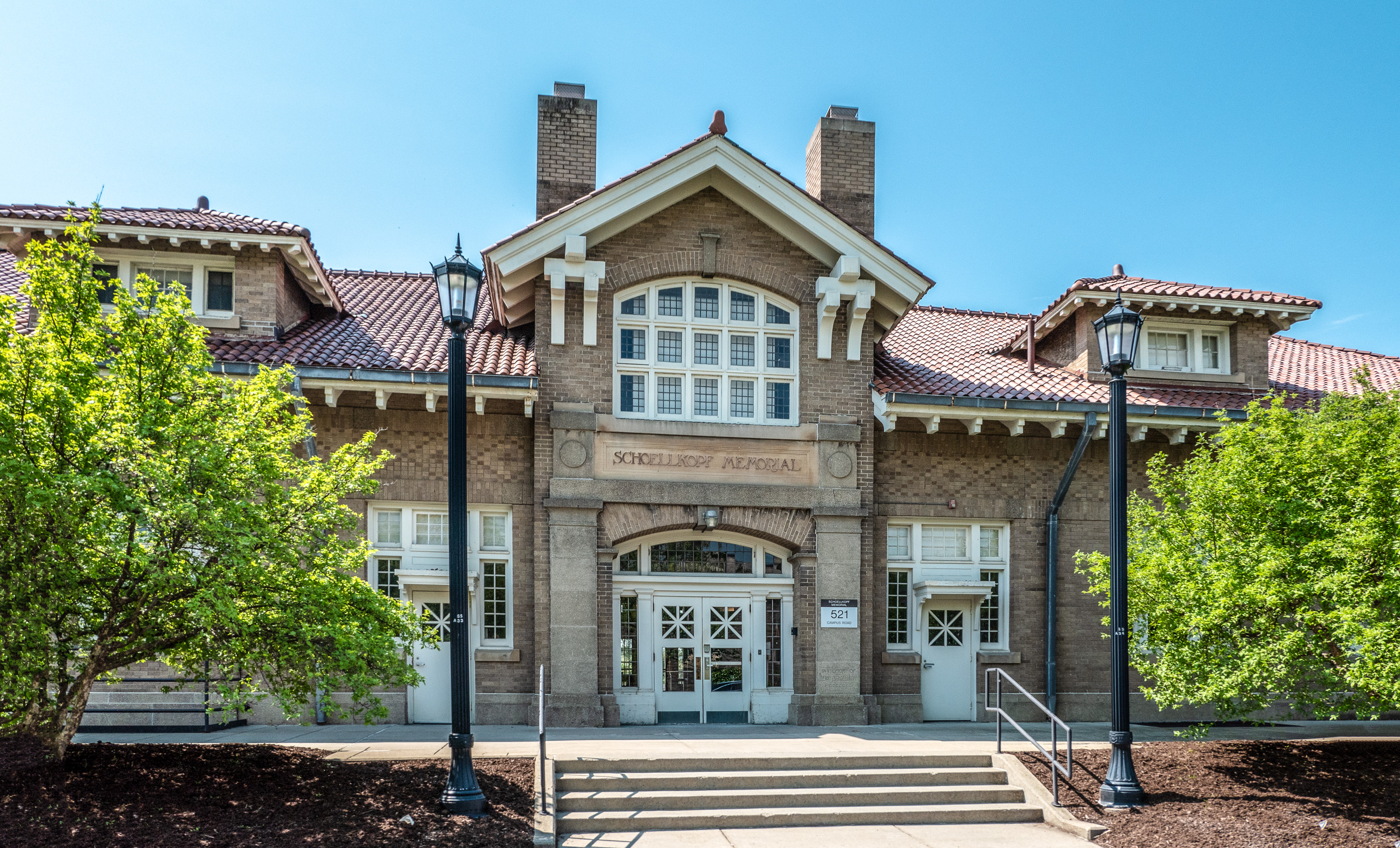
Schoellkopf Memorial Hall

During the 1800s, Cornell athletic teams played on Percy Field, located where Ithaca High School now stands. As the university and town grew, the need for a larger, dedicated stadium on campus became apparent.

Following the death of former Cornell football player and head football coach Henry Schoellkopf in 1912, his close friend, Willard Straight, donated $100,000 (equivalent to $3,336,000 in 2025) to construct the Schoellkopf Memorial Hall in honor of Henry Schoellkopf. The building was completed in 1913. In response to Straight's gift, members of the Schoellkopf family and the Zeta Psi fraternity donated $70,000 (equivalent to $2,250,000 in 2025) for the construction of Schoellkopf Field in honor of the Schoellkopf family patriarch, Jacob Schoellkopf, Schoellkopf Field was completed in 1915. The opening ceremony for Schoellkopf field took place on Saturday, October 9, 1915, in which an estimated 6,000 people marched in a procession led by university president Jacob Gould Schurman from Goldwin Smith Hall to the new stadium. It was said to be the largest gathering in Ithaca up to that time.

In 1920, a flood searchlight system was installed by General Electric. The system was intended to allow for play in the fall and winter months, without causing glare in the players' eyes.

Schoellkopf

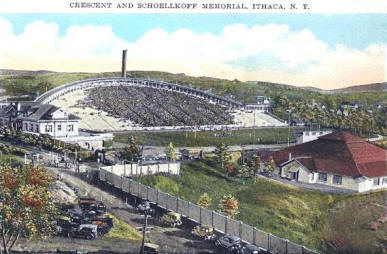
A 1922 souvenir postcard shows Schoellkopf Field's unique crescent-shaped stands

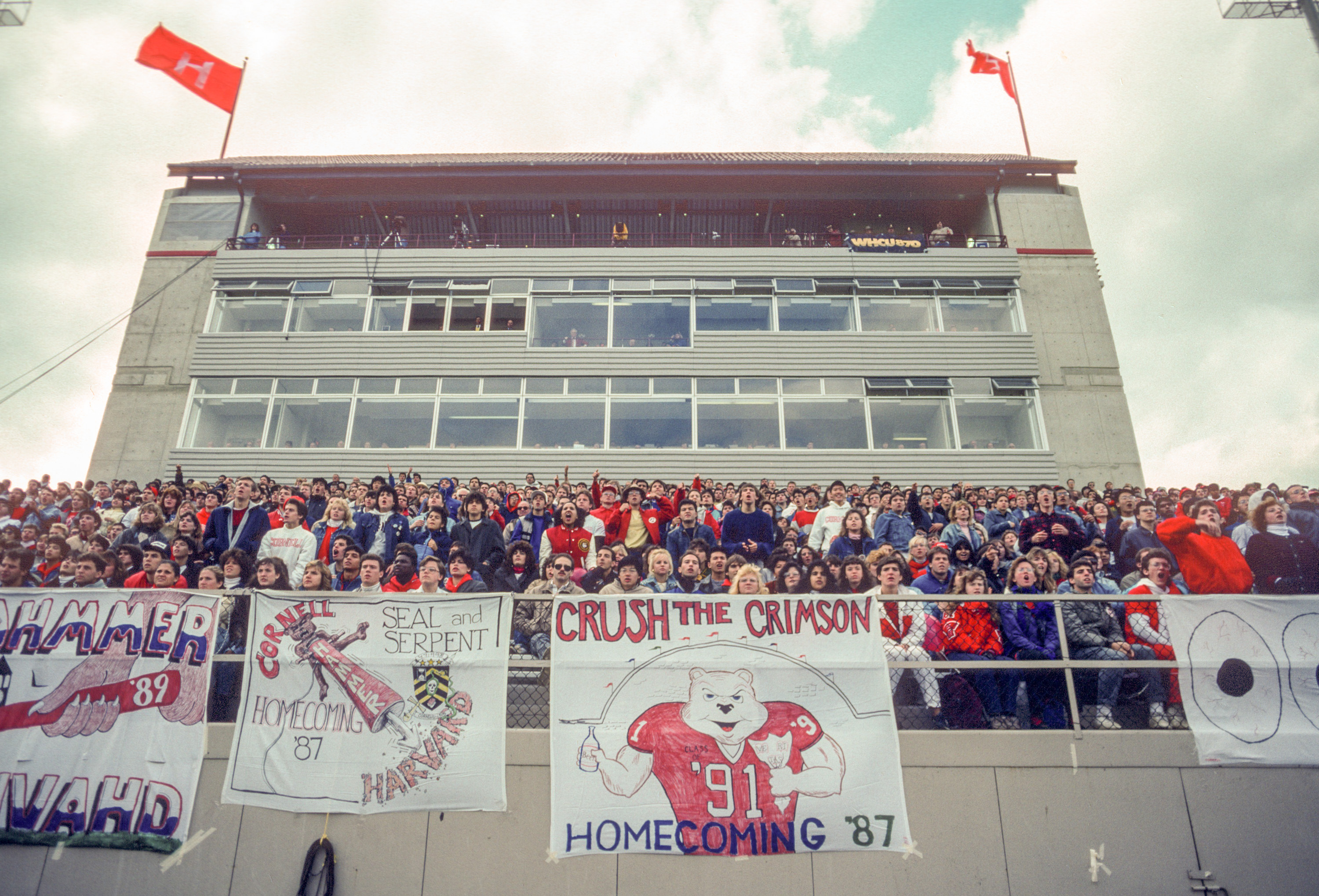
1987 Homecoming fans sit in the West Stands, which were removed in 2016

=== Increased capacity ===
Schoellkopf's original capacity when it was completed was about 9,000, but it has been expanded and changed many times over the years. In 1924, the newly completed "Crescent" replaced the original stands on the east side of the field, increasing seating to about 21,500. In 1947, the stadium's capacity was again increased, this time to a capacity of 25,597, with the construction of permanent steel bleachers on the west side of the field.

In 1971, the surface of the field was converted to "Polyturf", an artificial turf. The field has had its turf replaced by a newer type of turf in 1979, 1988, 1999, 2008 and, most recently, in 2016.

=== Later renovations ===
1986 saw a $3.6 million renovation, including the construction of a press box on the west side. The press box won an award in 1990 from the Sports Writer's Association of America. New light fixtures were installed in 1986 to allow for televised games at night.

During the summer of 2005, renovations on deteriorating concrete forced the university to close the Crescent, but it reopened in time for the fall football season. The renovated Memorial Hall at the north end of the field opened in 2006, containing improved locker rooms and training facilities. The Hall was expanded with a 16,000-square-foot (1,500 m^{2}) three-story wing on its east side, with the varsity football locker rooms on the first floor, a Hall of Fame Room on the second floor, and a museum of Cornell football memorabilia on the third floor. Over the summer of 2008, Cornell replaced the artificial turf with a FieldTurf pitch.

The west stands, which had been erected in 1947 to increase capacity to 25,597, were torn down in March 2016 after falling into disuse and disrepair.

== Commencement and other special events ==
Schoellkopf Commencements

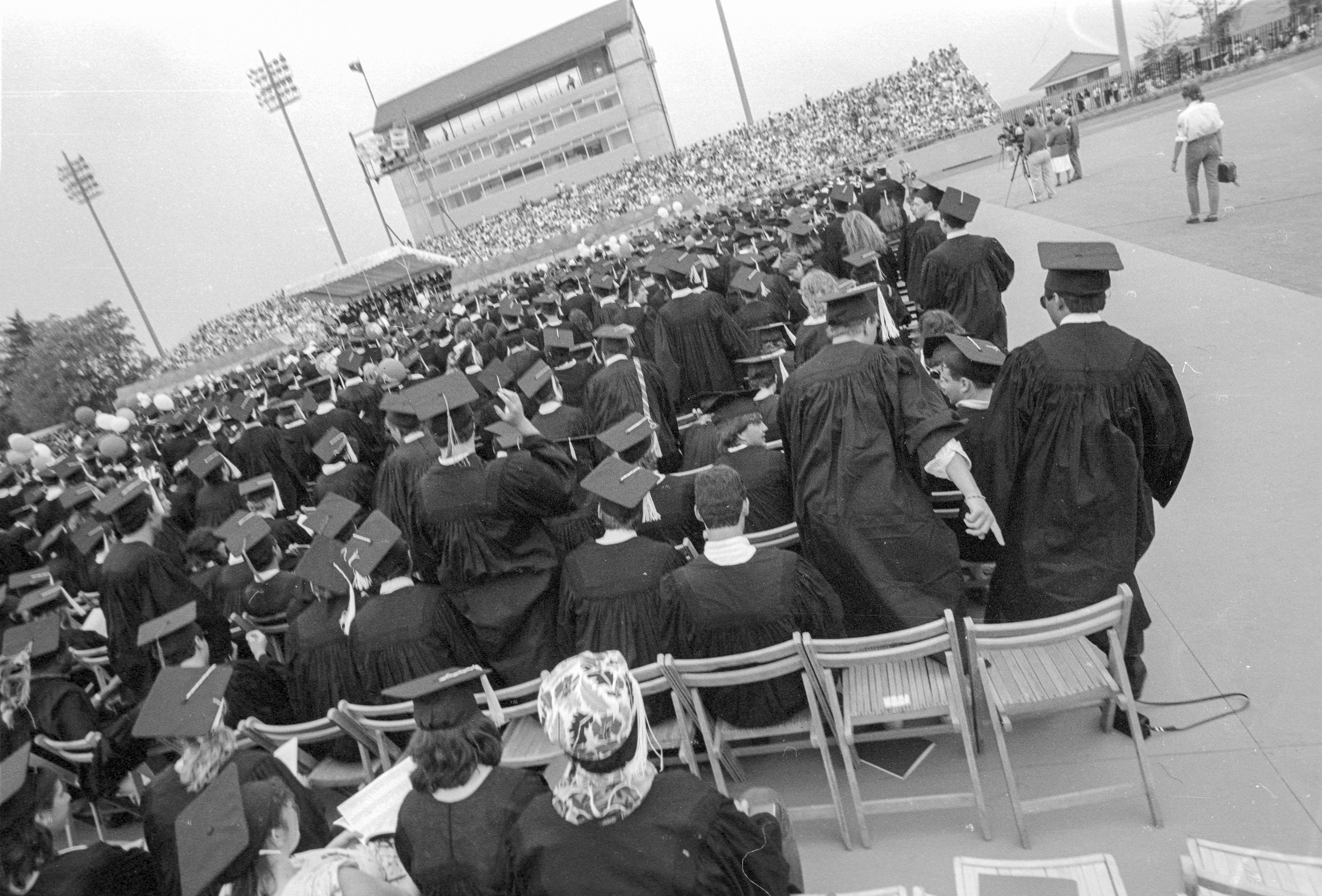
1987

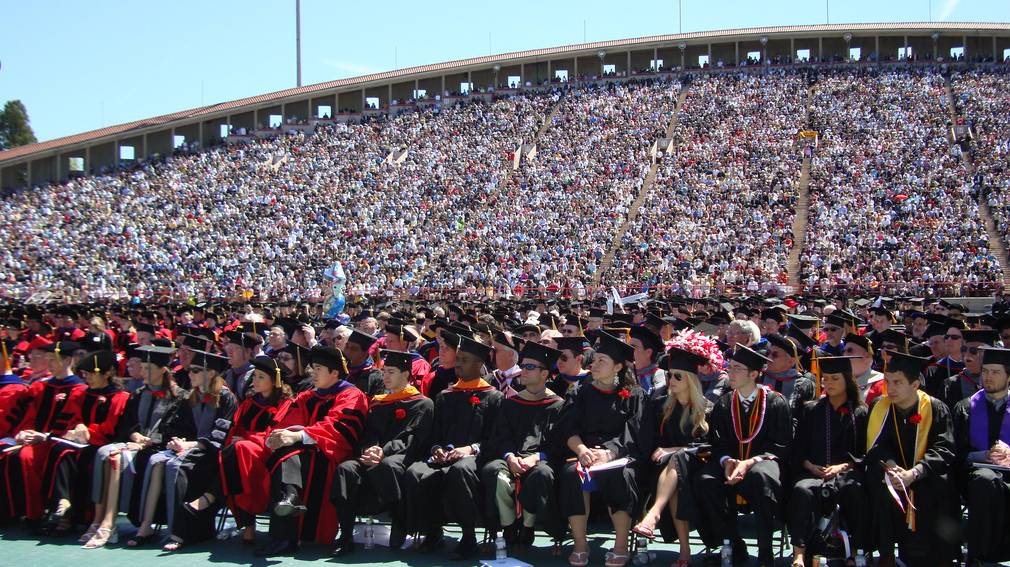
2008

During May of every year, weather permitting, Schoellkopf is the site of the commencement ceremony for Cornell's Ithaca campus. Schoellkopf Field hosted the Division I NCAA Men's Lacrosse Championship in 1980 and the Drum Corps International World Championships in 1974.

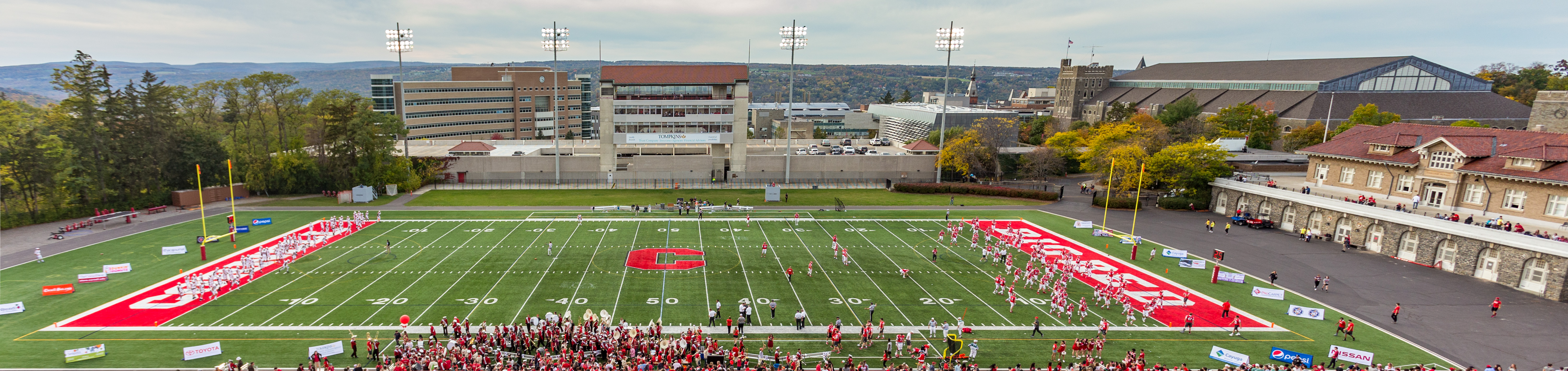
View from the Crescent looking toward the field and the press boxes. Homecoming game, Oct 21, 2017. Schoellkopf Memorial Hall at right.

== See also ==
- List of NCAA Division I FCS football stadiums

Preceded by Warhawk Stadium	Host of the Drum Corps International; World Championship; 1974	Succeeded by Franklin Field
Preceded by Byrd Stadium	Home of the NCAA Lacrosse Final Four; 1980	Succeeded by Palmer Stadium
