= Trails in Ithaca, New York =

This is a list of trails in Ithaca, New York.

== Multiuse and commuter trails ==
Many of the major trails in Ithaca and the surrounding areas lie in abandoned railroad beds. Ithaca was part of the first big railroad boom, in the 1830s. While only one short-haul rail freight line remains in Ithaca (the Ithaca Central Railroad: a 48.8-mile (78.5 km) branch line between Sayre, Pennsylvania and the Cargill salt mine, near Myers Point on the eastern shore of Cayuga Lake, that was the former Auburn & Ithaca Branch of the defunct Lehigh Valley Railroad), the area benefits from the use of the well-graded roadbeds that the railroads left behind.

In 2004, the City of Ithaca drew up a master plan for its trail system, to fill gaps in trail coverage and to make them more usable as commuter trails in addition to providing better access by foot and bicycle to major area natural preserves and state parks. If all of the connecting trails are completed, Ithaca will have a fairly complete network connecting most neighborhoods in the area without roads.

=== Cayuga Waterfront Trail ===
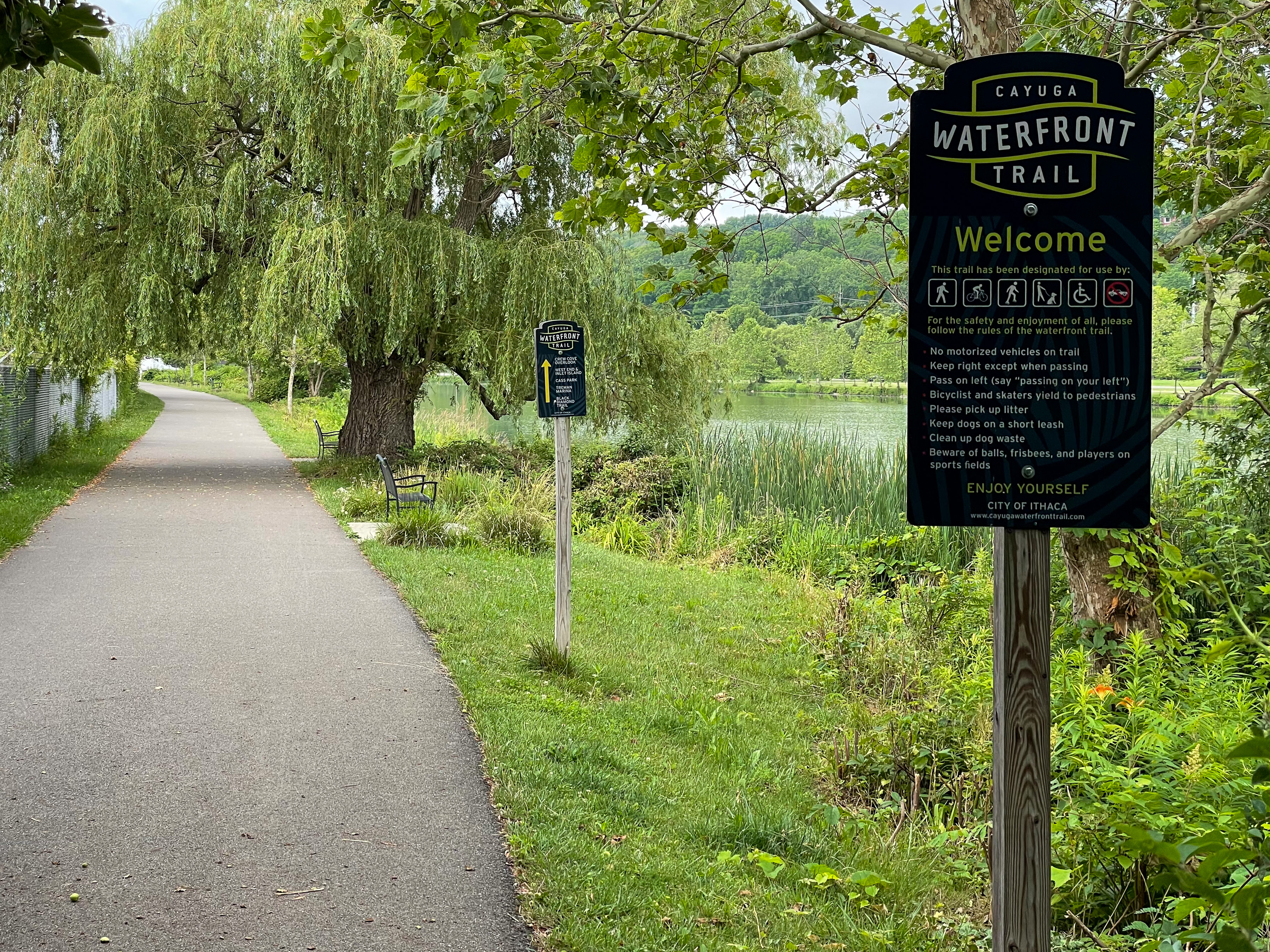
Cayuga Waterfront Trail

The Cayuga Waterfront Trail connects Cass Park, on the western shore of Cayuga Lake, to Stewart Park on its eastern shore. The trail is 10 to 12 feet (3.0 to 3.7 m) wide with an asphalt surface, and links Ithaca's waterfront destinations, including the Tompkins County Visitors' Center, the Ithaca Youth Bureau, Stewart Park, Cascadilla Boat Club, Newman Golf Course, Farmers' Market, Cornell and Ithaca College boathouses, Inlet Island (with a planned extension to the current US Coast Guard at the Inlet Island point), Cass Park and Allan H. Treman State Marine Park.

=== South Hill Recreation Way ===
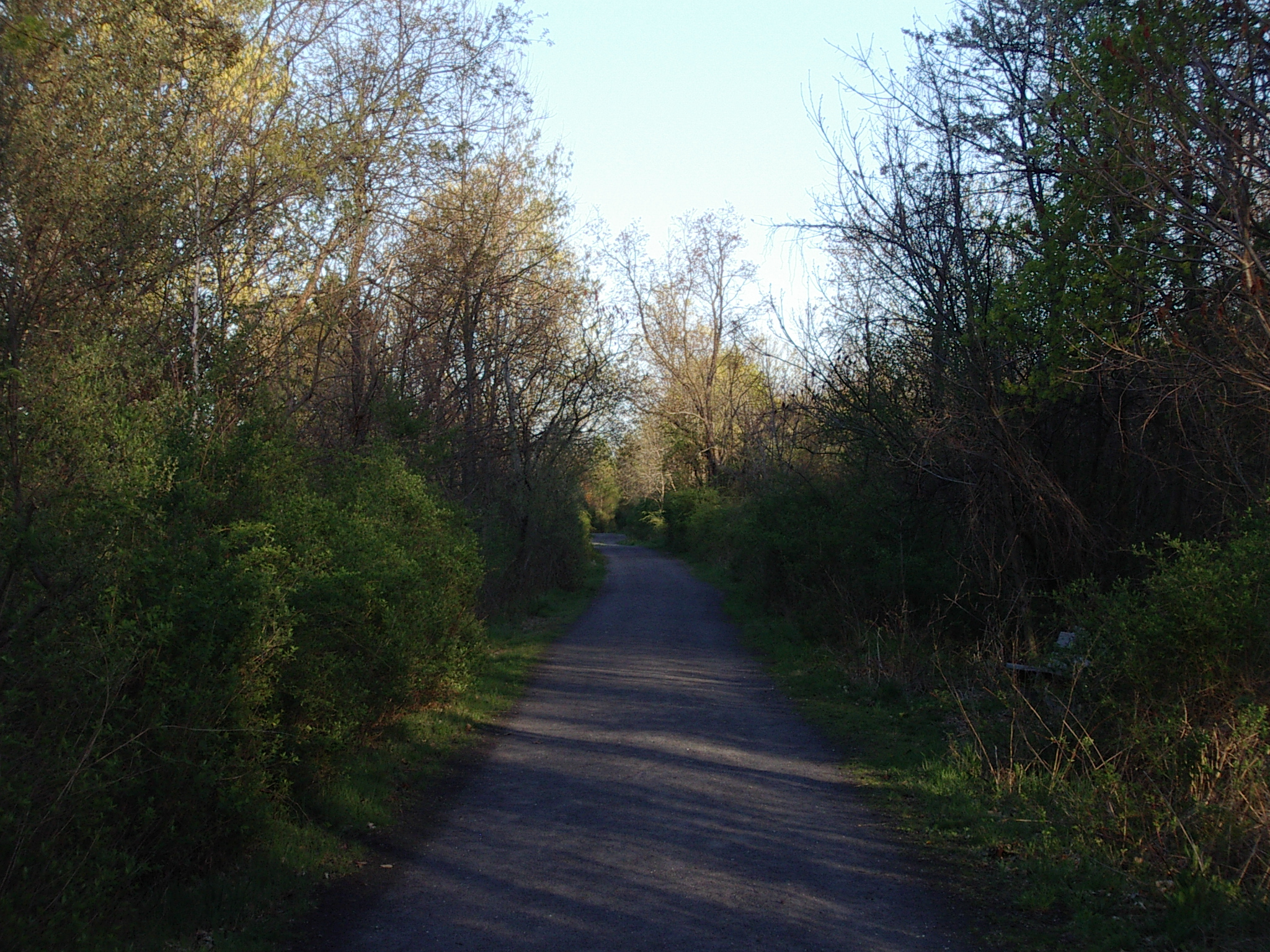
The trail in Spring

This 3.30-mile (5.31 km), packed-gravel trail was developed in 1986 as a New York State Environmental Quality Bond Act Project. It runs parallel to (northeast of) Coddington Road in the Town of Ithaca, mostly following the abandoned rail bed of the Cayuga and Susquehanna Railroad, which was built in 1849 to ship coal from Pennsylvania mines to Ithaca for water shipment over the Erie Canal. Eventually, it merged with the Delaware, Lackawanna and Western Railroad and was abandoned in 1956. The descent into Ithaca from South Hill was via two switchbacks. The trail skips the middle switchback. Instead, it follows a short, steep asphalt-paved connector (not part of the railroad) from the upper to lower grades. The tail tracks of the switchbacks are not included in the trail; these were located northwest of Coddington Road at the end of the upper trail, and southease of the bottom of the connector, respectively. Except for the connector, the trail is a gradual downhill from Burns Road to Ithaca. Hiking paths lead off the biking trail into the Six Mile Creek gorge. The trail is a popular spot for cross-country skiing in the winter and, in the summer, connects Ithaca College students to sunning and (illegal) swimming in Six Mile Creek and the City Reservoir.

Small parking areas are located at the end of Juniper Drive and at the corner of Burns Road and Coddington Road in the Town of Ithaca.

=== East Ithaca Recreation Way ===
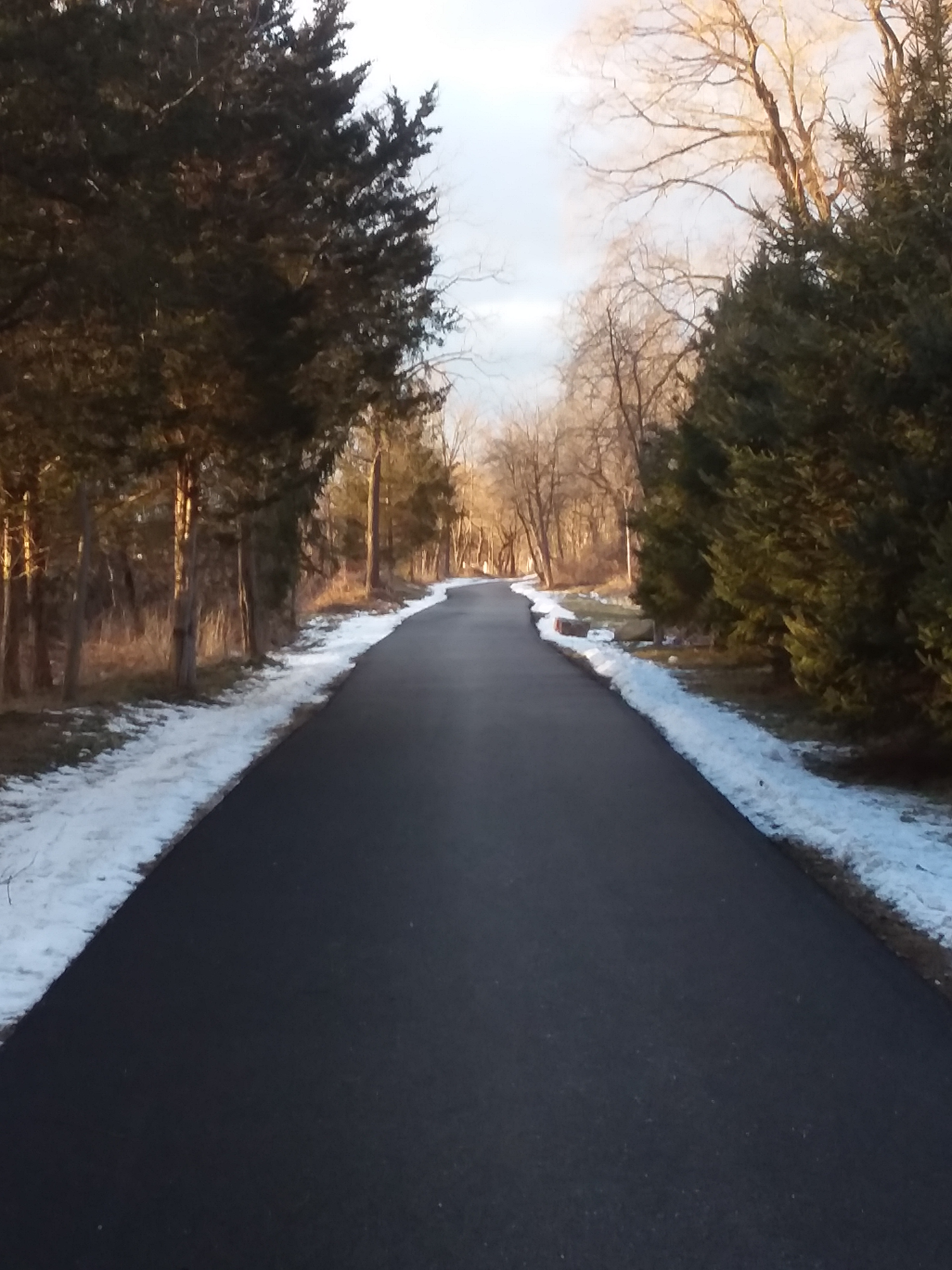
East Hill Recreation Way in winter

East Ithaca Recreation Way is a paved pedestrian/bike trail in East Hill which runs in several sections between Game Farm Road and Honness Lane and joins with the Vincent and Hannah Pew Trail to the south. It is open one-half hour before sunrise until one-half hour after sunset. Many benches exist along the trail, providing rest areas for hikers and joggers.

The northernmost section from Game Farm Road to Maple Avenue runs through Cornell-owned natural areas along Cascadilla Creek, and allows for horseback riding. The total length of this section is 1.2 miles (1.9 km). From Game Farm Road to the bridge over Judd Falls Road it is built on the railroad bed of the former Elmira, Cortland and Northern Railroad (later taken into the Lehigh Valley Railroad) (1871–1976), out of service since Hurricane Agnes in June, 1972 and formally abandoned with the formation of Conrail in April 1976.

To get to the next portion of the trail, one continues for 0.3 miles (0.48 km) west along Maple Avenue, where the trail starts up again.

The middle section runs south from Maple Avenue to Honness Lane (crossing Mitchell Street along the way) and is built on the railroad bed of the former Elmira, Cortland and Northern Railroad (later taken into the Lehigh Valley Railroad) (1875–1936). This section of the trail is a popular way to commute to and from Cornell's main campus. The total length of this section is 0.9 miles (1.4 km).

To get to the next portion of the trail, one continues 0.2 miles (0.32 km) east up Honness Lane and then across Pine Tree Road.

The southernmost section of the trail is also known as the Vincent and Hannah Pew Trail, and connects the trail to the Tudor Park and the Snyder Hill / Eastern Heights neighborhood. This part of the trail travels through the Pine Tree Wildlife Preserve and the East Ithaca Nature Preserve for 0.8 miles (1.3 km). There is a parking area for trail users, a bus pull-off and transit plaza with connections to the trail on Pine Tree Road, benches and plantings. The trail received a federal highway grant to aid in completion in 2004.

The total length of the trail (including all three sections and connecting streets) is 3.3 miles (5.3 km).

=== Jim Schug Trail / Dryden Lake Trail ===
The Jim Schug Trail, named after the Dryden Town supervisor who secured most of the land but died shortly after the beginning of construction, is 4.2 miles (6.8 km) in length. Like other trails in the area, it runs on an abandoned railroad bed (the Southern Central railway: for most of its existence, part of the Lehigh Valley). It begins on Main Street in Dryden, and continues to the Cortland County border, where it connects to the Finger Lakes Trail. A proposed 3.3-mile (5.3 km) extension of the trail would connect it northwest to the nearby village of Freeville (also in the Town of Dryden), and eventually via the Varna / Fall Creek trail to Ithaca. It is gravel-packed and suitable for bicycling, and is also level for the entire route.

=== Black Diamond Trail ===
The Black Diamond trail is the keystone of a major trail system in the Ithaca area, and has been planned since the 1970s. The section of trail from Cass Park to Taughannock Falls State Park opened in the fall of 2016. This section is now (since 1999) owned by the New York State Parks Department.

The main trail segment is the former Lehigh Valley Railroad passenger line from Ithaca to Auburn, New York, popularly known as the "Route of the Black Diamond" from the name of the Lehigh Valley's premier passenger train, which last ran on February 4, 1959. This line stretches along the western shore of Cayuga Lake from Cass Park to Taughannock Falls State Park and Trumansburg, New York, steadily rising from lake level to 840 feet (260 m) above sea level at the bridge across Taughannock Creek.

South of Cass Park, the about 2 miles (3.2 km) of the planned route follows the Cayuga Flood Control Channel along Route 13a, and then crosses the flood control channel via recently-built bridge directly opposite Cecil Malone Drive at Cherry Street, providing access to the Cherry Street Industrial Park, the city's Southwest district, and a housing development. From there, it follows the DL&W right of way built in 1849 as part of the Cayuga & Susquehanna railroad, crossing over the fish ladder and eventually goes underneath the Route 13 bridge near the Town/City of Ithaca line, and then proceeds parallel to its south side, terminating in Robert H. Treman State Park. This urban section of the trail is estimated to cost $5 million, mostly for the construction of three new bridges: the bridge connecting to Cecil Malone Drive, one near the fish ladder and a third bridge crossing over the Cayuga Inlet near the trail branch connecting to Buttermilk Falls.

This last connecting trail is planned to branch near the City / Town of Ithaca line to connect to the (planned) Gateway Trail, past the edge of Buttermilk Falls State Park and towards South Hill Recreation way. A pedestrian/bicycle bridge already stretches over Route 13 near Buttermilk Falls to provide access to the planned Gateway trail. This "bridge to nowhere" was built before any rights to the abandoned DL&W were secured, and at the time was widely criticized as a spectacularly visible example of a "pork barrel" waste of tax money, as the trail it connects was not built until much later. It is now part of the completed section of the Gateway Trail.

Much more information, including the master plans, are available online at the NY State Parks website.

=== Lansing Town Trail (Phase 1 open) ===
The 2.4 miles (3.9 km) Phase 1 walking trail on farmland owned by the Town of Lansing opened on January 22, 2011. It is a loop trail mostly in open fields with magnificent views of the Cayuga Lake Valley and hills to the south east. Although intended for hiking, X-C Skiing (rated easy), and snowshoeing, it may be expanded for multipurpose use in the future.

=== East-South Trail (planned) ===
The East-South connector trail extends from the terminus of South Hill Recreation Way near the intersection of Coddington Road and Burns Road, crosses Route 79/Slaterville Springs Road, runs along it for a short distance, and then connects through Snyder Hill to the planned Pew trail. Almost all of this connector trail will likely be either in the form of bike lanes along the road, or simply the addition of signage to indicate that bikes and cars will share the road. Although Burns Road has fairly light traffic, Route 79 is a major corridor, so safety might be an issue if the route is not separated from traffic.

Because it crosses a shallow valley to join South Hill and East Hill, Burns Road has fairly steep sections, but this likely remains the best route to connect the two existing trails.

=== Varna Trail / Fall Creek Trail (planned) ===
The Varna and Fall Creek trails are one continuous segment on the Lehigh Valley (Elmira, Cortland & Northern) railbed from Varna to the East Ithaca Recreation Way at its northeast terminus, passing through the Monkey Run nature preserve in the Cornell Plantations. As is the case for many of the other planned trails, several bridges need to be repaired or built along its route before it can be completed. Part of the route is already used by the Cayuga Trail.

=== Gateway Trail / Buttermilk Falls Corridor (in progress) ===
The completed Gateway trail will go up South Hill, connecting the Black Diamond trail in the city's Southwest area with the northern branch of the South Hill Recreation Way, using the former DL&W right-of-way. As of 2026 only the section from behind Home Depot to Stone Quarry Road is complete.

==== Lower Buttermilk falls to somewhat past Stone Quarry road ====
This portion belongs to the State of New York and Pennsylvania Lines LLC. It is complete on both sides of the "bridge to nowhere", uphill to Stone Quarry Road and downhill to a dead end behind Home Depot. The missing segment to the Black Diamond Trail needs a bridge across a branch of Cayuga Inlet and a connection to Cherry Street. The section past Stone Quarry Road to Emerson is not developed and on private land.

==== Portion near Emerson ====
This portion belongs to Emerson, still has old railroad ties and would need substantial work. It has a substandard bridge over the extension of S. Cayuga Street. It then connects to the end of Turner Place near Hillview Place. Because Hillview is too narrow for a completely separate path, the current plan involves the use of bike lanes or shared roadway signage for the last connection. The most favorable routing would go through Emerson Power Transmission property, and rights have not yet been negotiated. Despite the barriers to completion, completing this connector trail is frequently cited as a priority by State and County officials when discussing the Black Diamond Trail, because of the connection to the heavily used South Hill Recreation Way. It would provide a pedestrian and bicycle shortcut between South Hill and Southwest Ithaca.

=== East Shore Trail (planned) ===
This trail would extend along the hillside above the eastern shore of Cayuga Lake, connecting the City and Town of Ithaca with Lansing. It would use the abandoned Central New York Southern Railroad grade (popularly known as the Ithaca-Auburn Short Line). Bridges were removed from the line when it was dismantled in the 1920s; two were replaced by footbridges built by the sewer district which uses this right of way and used for monitoring sewer lines, but they are posted "No Trespassing" and have locked fences at both ends.

== Hiking trails and paths ==
=== Finger Lakes Trail System ===
The main Finger Lakes Trail passes south of Ithaca proper and follows the south boundary inside Robert H. Treman State Park. An orange-blazed connecting trail from upper Lick Brook links it with the trail system at Buttermilk Falls State Park, near the S end of Lake Treman. The portion of the Finger Lakes Trail between Watkins Glen and Caroline is maintained by volunteers of the Cayuga Trails Club.

=== Cayuga Trail ===
The 8.5-mile (13.7 km) long Cayuga Trail originates at the Stewart Avenue bridge over Fall Creek, and passes eastward through the Cornell University campus and plantations, generally paralleling Fall Creek. It crosses the Creek on a suspension bridge in the vicinity of Forest Home, and again via the Route 13 bridge. After the second crossing, it turns westward again, using the LV railbed part of the way, and ending in the vicinity of Varna. The Cayuga Trail was built and is maintained by volunteers from the Cayuga Trails Club.

== Natural features and attractions ==
=== Cascadilla Creek ===
A trail leads from the College Avenue Bridge down along the gorge to Court and Linn Street in Ithaca, providing a convenient route between downtown Ithaca and the Cornell University campus. A path also extends through the Cornell Campus from the College Avenue Bridge upstream to the Hoy Road Bridge. The trail is closed during the winter.

=== Six Mile Creek ===
View of Six Mile Creek in winter

Access to this gorge trail can be found within the Town and City of Ithaca. Two major access points within the city are via the South Hill Recreation Way, or via a small parking lot at the intersection of Giles and Water streets. On a given summer day, you might find both human fishermen and a great blue heron. The trail also provides access to the old City Reservoir, a popular (but illegal and unsafe) swimming destination in the summer.

== State parks ==
Buttermilk Falls

Allan H. Treman and Taughannock Falls State Parks are both near Lake Cayuga and are oriented towards shorter, lighter walks and hikes, while Buttermilk Falls and Robert H. Treman State Parks are marked by their waterfalls, and focus on hiking trails which follow their respective creeks, and are thus more difficult although still rewarding trails.

- Allan H. Treman State Marine Park
- Buttermilk Falls State Park
- Robert H. Treman State Park (Also extends into the Town of Newfield)
- Taughannock Falls State Park (In town of Ulysses)

== Water access ==
- Allan H. Treman State Marine Park
- Cayuga Inlet
- Fall Creek (via Stewart Park)
- Beebe Lake
