= Robert H. Treman =

American banker (1858–1937)

Robert Henry Treman
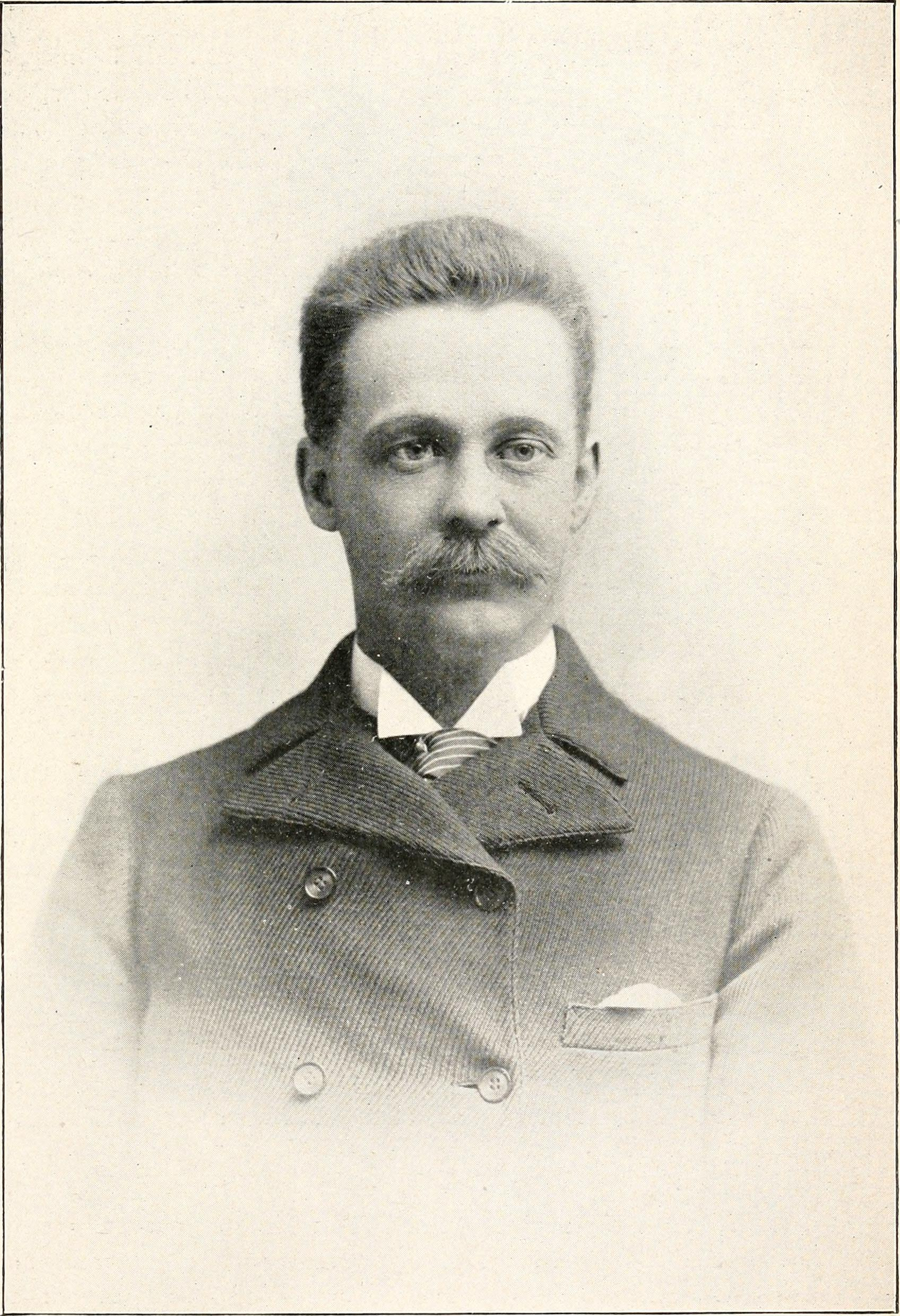

Deputy Governor of the Federal Reserve Bank of New York
- In office July 1, 1916 – November 1, 1919

Personal details
- Born: March 31, 1858 Ithaca, New York, U.S.
- Died: January 4, 1937 (aged 78) Ithaca, New York, U.S.
- Education: Cornell University

Robert Henry Treman (March 31, 1858 – January 4, 1937) was an American banker and financier who served as a director and deputy governor of the Federal Reserve Bank of New York. A native of upstate New York, he attended Cornell University and was a member of its board of trustees for 46 years.

Treman was instrumental in the establishment of several state parks in the Finger Lakes region of New York. Lands acquired by his family were gifted to the state in the 1920s to become Enfield Glen State Park (later renamed in Treman's honor after his death), Buttermilk Falls State Park, and Taughannock Falls State Park, among others.

== Biography ==
=== Early life and education ===
Treman was born in Ithaca, New York on March 31, 1858, the oldest son of Elias Treman and Elizabeth Lovejoy Treman. Members of the Treman family played important roles in the history of Ithaca and the surrounding Tompkins County over five generations from the late 18th century to the late 20th century. His family owned an iron foundry and had controlling interests in the Ithaca Gas Light Company and the Ithaca Water Works.

He attended Ithaca Academy and studied mechanical engineering at Cornell University, graduating in 1878. At Cornell, Treman played baseball and became the team's captain in his senior year. He also rowed on the crew team, played football, and was a member of the Chi Phi fraternity.

=== Banking career ===
Treman's father, Elias, was a partner in the hardware business started by his two brothers and a prominent business leader in the Ithaca community. After graduating from Cornell, Treman joined his father's business as salesman and eventually became a partner several years later. He became interested in banking early in his career and, in 1891, was elected as a director on the board of the Tompkins County National Bank. He would go on to become the bank's president in 1901, a role in which he would stay for more than 30 years before becoming the chairman of the board and heading up a merger with the Ithaca Trust Company.

In 1913, Treman was elected to the board of the directors of the Federal Reserve Bank of New York. He would later serve as the deputy of the bank's first governor, Benjamin Strong Jr., from 1916 to 1919 and took the role of acting governor when Strong was recovering from tuberculosis during World War I. He was also selected as the bank's representative to serve on the Federal Advisory Council. Treman's term on the bank's board of directors ended on January 1, 1931.

=== Personal life ===
Treman married Laura Hosie on June 24, 1885. The couple had two children, Robert Elias Treman and Allan Hosie Treman, both of whom attended Cornell University. Treman died on January 4, 1937, following a heart attack.

== Cornell University trustee ==
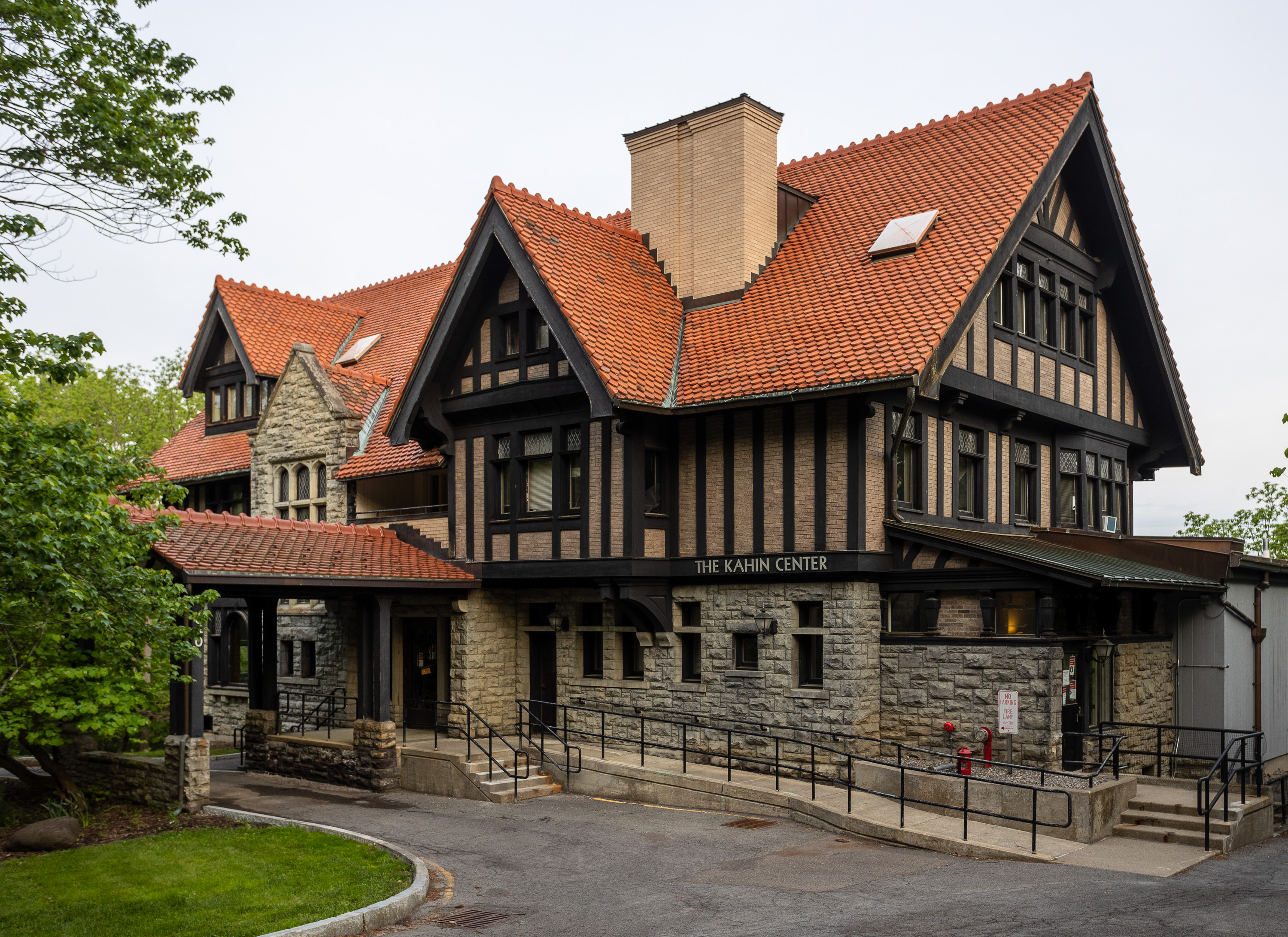
Robert Treman House on 640 Stewart Avenue, now used as the Kahin Center for Advanced Research on Southeast Asia

Treman was elected by his fellow Cornell alumni to the university's board of trustees as an alumnus trustee in 1891. He served in the role for five years before being re-elected as a trustee by the full board. He remained a member of the board for 46 years until his death and, at the time, held the longest continuous record as a trustee in the history of the university.

As trustee, Treman was a member of the committee on buildings and grounds. He led beautification efforts of natural features on campus, such as Cascadilla Gorge and Fall Creek, protecting them from privatization and development and keeping them open for public use. Treman invited Boston-based landscape designer Warren H. Manning to Ithaca in 1900 to design an estate for his family near the Cornell campus. Following this engagement, Manning would later become involved in projects with the university, completing two campus master plans with landscape architect Bryant Fleming in 1910 and 1930.

In 1901, Treman and his brother began building their family estates in Ithaca's East Hill, a new and prestigious neighborhood on the edge of the Cornell campus. His modified Arts and Crafts style house on 640 Stewart Avenue had a view of Cayuga Lake and was designed by architect William Henry Miller. Treman family members continued to live in the house until 1942, and Cornell began negotiations to purchase the house from the family in 1944. The building today houses the Cornell Southeast Asia Program's George McT. Kahin Center for Advanced Research on Southeast Asia.

== Land acquisitions and donations ==
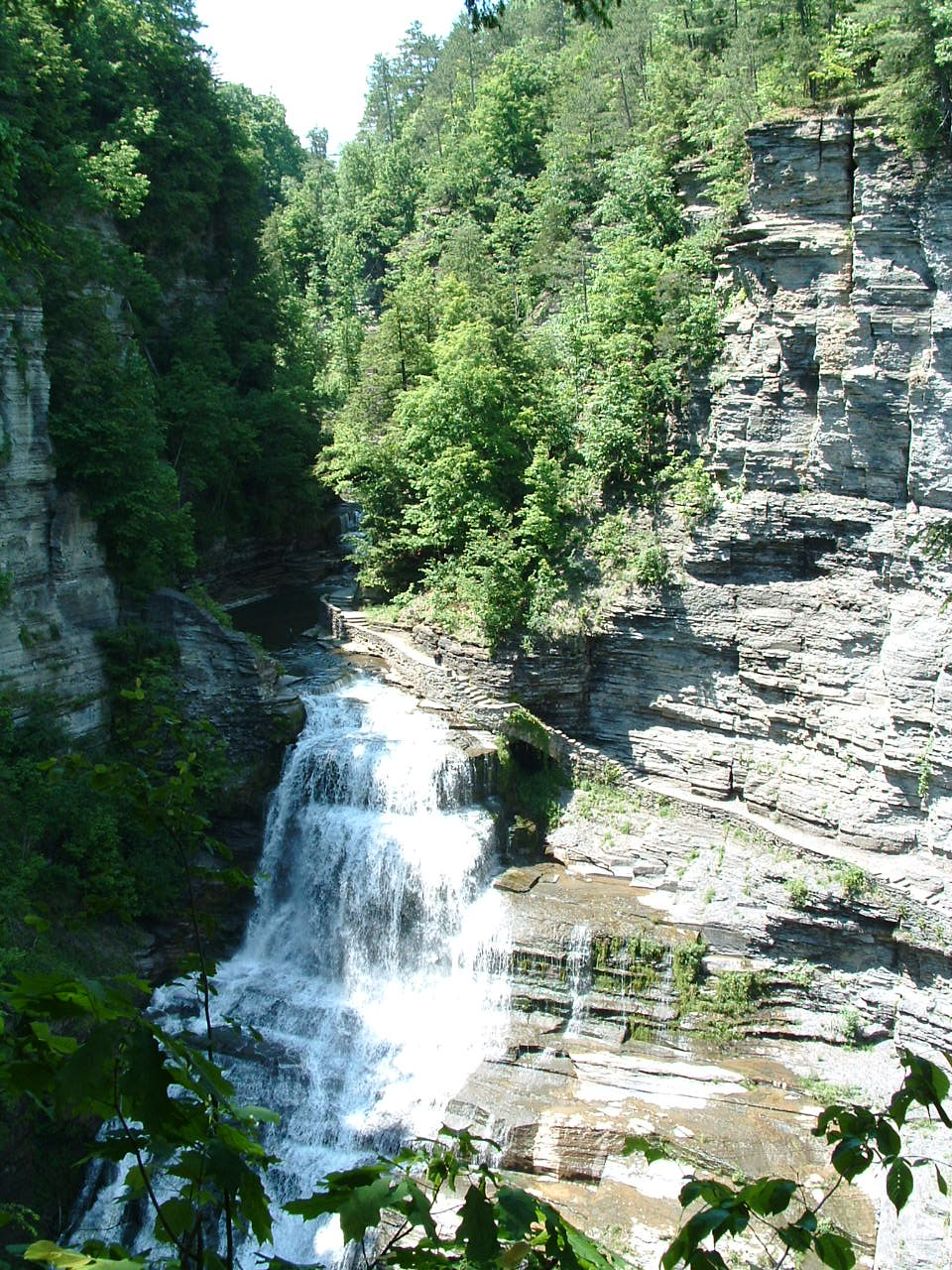
Lucifer Falls, a popular hiking destination, was rehabilitated in 1916.

Treman and his family played an instrumental role in the formation of state parks around the Finger Lakes region of New York state. During a picnic trip to Enfield Glen and Lucifer Falls in 1914, he became concerned about the maintenance of pedestrian paths near area gorges. Many of these paths and bridges were built in the 1890s, but they were not well-maintained despite the popularity of the site for picnic parties. The following year, he purchased the lands containing the gorge to rehabilitate it.

In 1916, Treman once again hired Warren H. Manning to advise on a plan to restore the trails in the forty acres of land around Lucifer Falls. Manning designed improvements that included stone arch bridges, with steps and railings made from natural stone so that the developments are inconspicuous. He also helped preserve an old flour mill which had ceased operations nearby. That site would later be designated Enfield Falls Mill and Miller's House by the U.S. National Register of Historic Places in 1979.

Not satisfied with the achievements in Enfield Glen, Treman and his wife would purchase an additional 387 acres of land around the gorge by 1920. That year, they donated the site's more than 400 acres of land to the State of New York to be designated as Enfield Falls Reservation. After Treman's death, the state changed the name of the reservation to Robert H. Treman State Park.

The Tremans also acquired land that would become Buttermilk Falls State Park (acquired in 1916, gifted in 1924) and Taughannock Falls State Park. In 1924, New York Governor Alfred E. Smith endorsed the establishment of a unified state parks system for the state, and Treman was appointed the first chairman of the state parks commission for the Finger Lakes region. He would go on to serve in that role until his death in 1937.

== Bibliography ==
- Brown, Jacob (2017). "Robert H. Treman and Charles E. Treman Estates". Warren H. Manning: Landscape Architect and Environmental Planner. Athens, Georgia: The University of Georgia Press. pp. 232–235. ISBN 978-0-8203-5066-0.
- "Campus, Town Mourn Passing of Robert Henry Treman, 78; Lehman Offers Condolences". The Cornell Daily Sun. Vol. 57, no. 70. January 5, 1937. p. 1.
- "216. Retirement of Robert H. Treman". Circular No. 216. Retirement of Robert H. Treman. Federal Reserve Bank of New York Circulars. Federal Reserve Bank of New York. October 31, 1919.
- Endres, Gene (June 18, 2004). "A Gift from Generations Past". Ithaca Times.
- Krall, Daniel (2017a). "Cornell University Campus". Warren H. Manning: Landscape Architect and Environmental Planner. Athens, Georgia: The University of Georgia Press. pp. 208–210. ISBN 978-0-8203-5066-0.
- Krall, Daniel (2017b). "Enfield Glen State Park (Robert H. Treman State Park)". Warren H. Manning: Landscape Architect and Environmental Planner. Athens, Georgia: The University of Georgia Press. pp. 211–216. ISBN 978-0-8203-5066-0.
- Palmyra, Cassandra (January 16, 2013). "Treman Family Guided Region Toward the Future For Two Centuries". Ithaca Times.
- Sisler, Carol U. (1986). Enterprising Families, Ithaca, New York: Their Houses and Businesses. Ithaca, New York: Enterprise Publishing.
- Treman, Ebenezer Mack; Poole, Murray E. (1901). The History of the Treman, Tremaine, Truman Family in America. Vol. 1. Ithaca, New York: Press of the Ithaca Democrat.
- "Who was Robert H. Treman?". Friends of Robert H. Treman State Park. December 4, 2012.
