= Allan H. Treman State Marine Park =

State park and marina in Tompkins County, New York

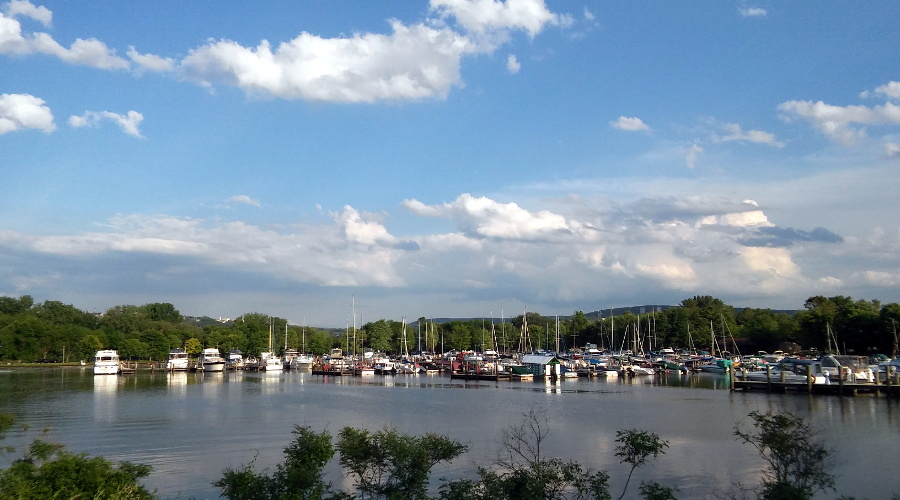
- Marina at Allan H. Treman State Marine Park

- Location within New York
- Type: State park
- Location: 805 Taughannock Blvd. Ithaca, New York
- Nearest city: Ithaca, New York
- Coordinates: 42°28′N 76°31′W
- Area: 91 acres (0.37 km^{2})
- Operator: New York State Office of Parks, Recreation and Historic Preservation
- Visitors: 331,886 (in 2025)
- Open: All year
- Website: Allan H. Treman State Marine Park

Allan H. Treman State Marine Park is a 91-acre (0.37 km^{2}) state park and marina located in the City of Ithaca in Tompkins County, New York, United States. The park is located at the south end of Cayuga Lake, one of the 11 Finger Lakes of New York. The park's namesake, Allan Hosie Treman (1899-1975) was a Cornell University law professor, Ithaca city counsel, and member of the Finger Lakes Park Commission. He is the son of Robert H. Treman, who also has a state park named in his honor.

== Park description ==
Allan H. Treman State Marine Park offers an eight-lane boat launch and a marina that includes 370 seasonal, 30 transient and 30 dry boat slips. Boats launched at the facility have easy access to the New York State Canal System. Fishing, birdwatching opportunities (waterfowl and wetland species), and picnic tables are also available at the park.

== Gallery ==
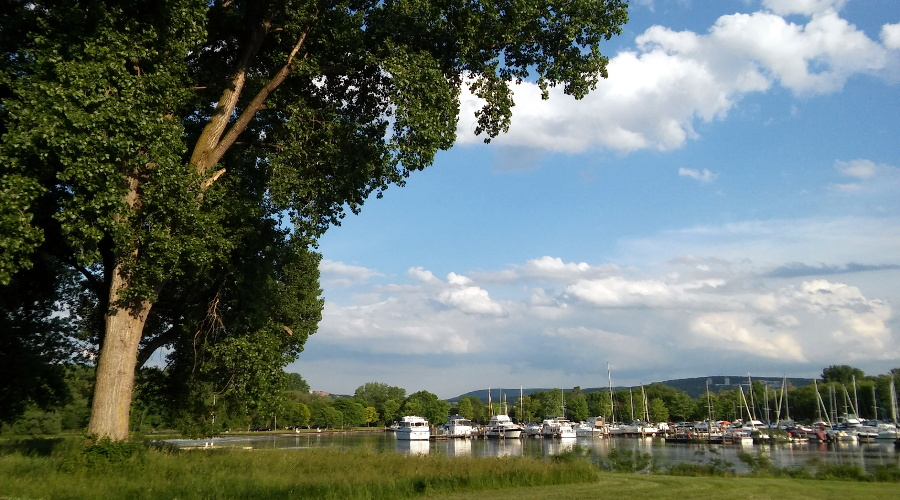
The marina connects to the south end of Cayuga Lake via the lake inlet.

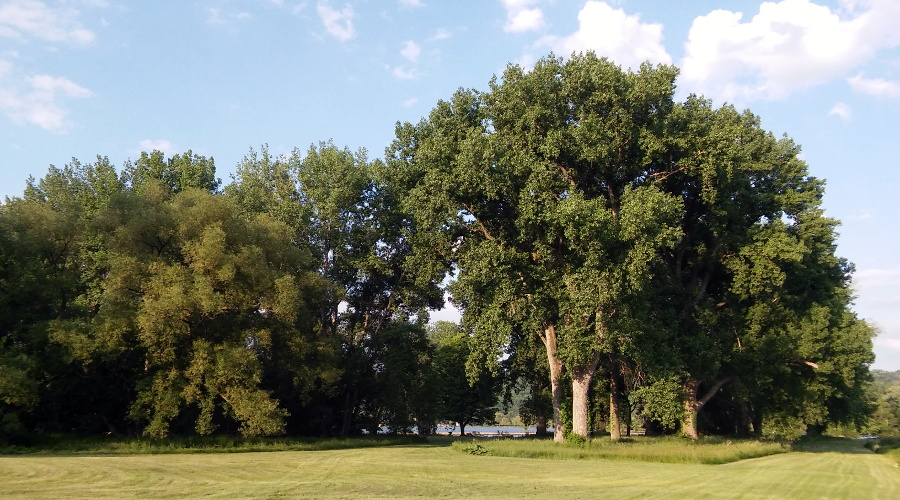
The cottonwood grove features 100-foot (30 m) cottonwood trees mixed with maples and other species

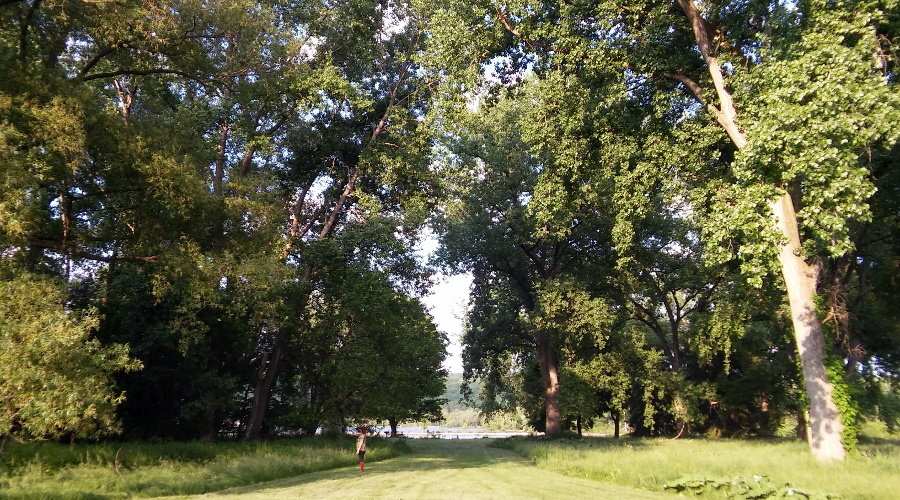
Another view of the cottonwood grove

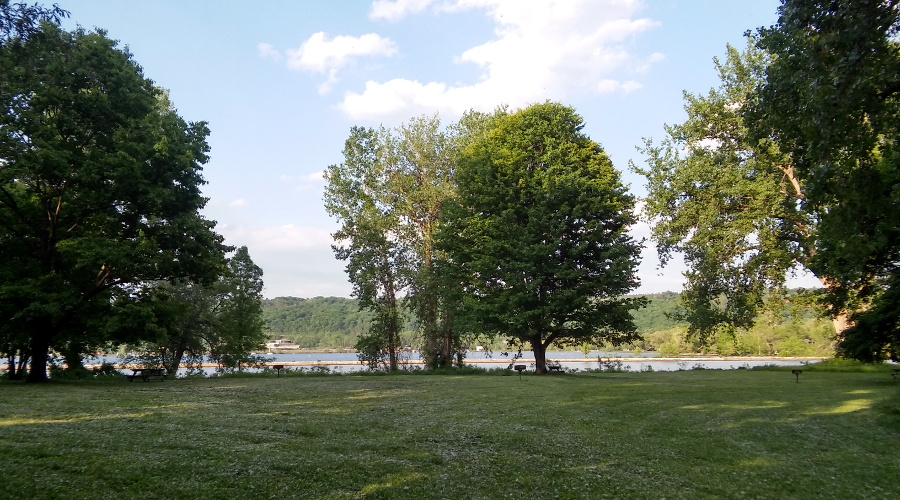
The picnic area in the cottonwood grove

== See also ==
- List of New York state parks
