= Robert H. Treman State Park =

State park in New York, United States

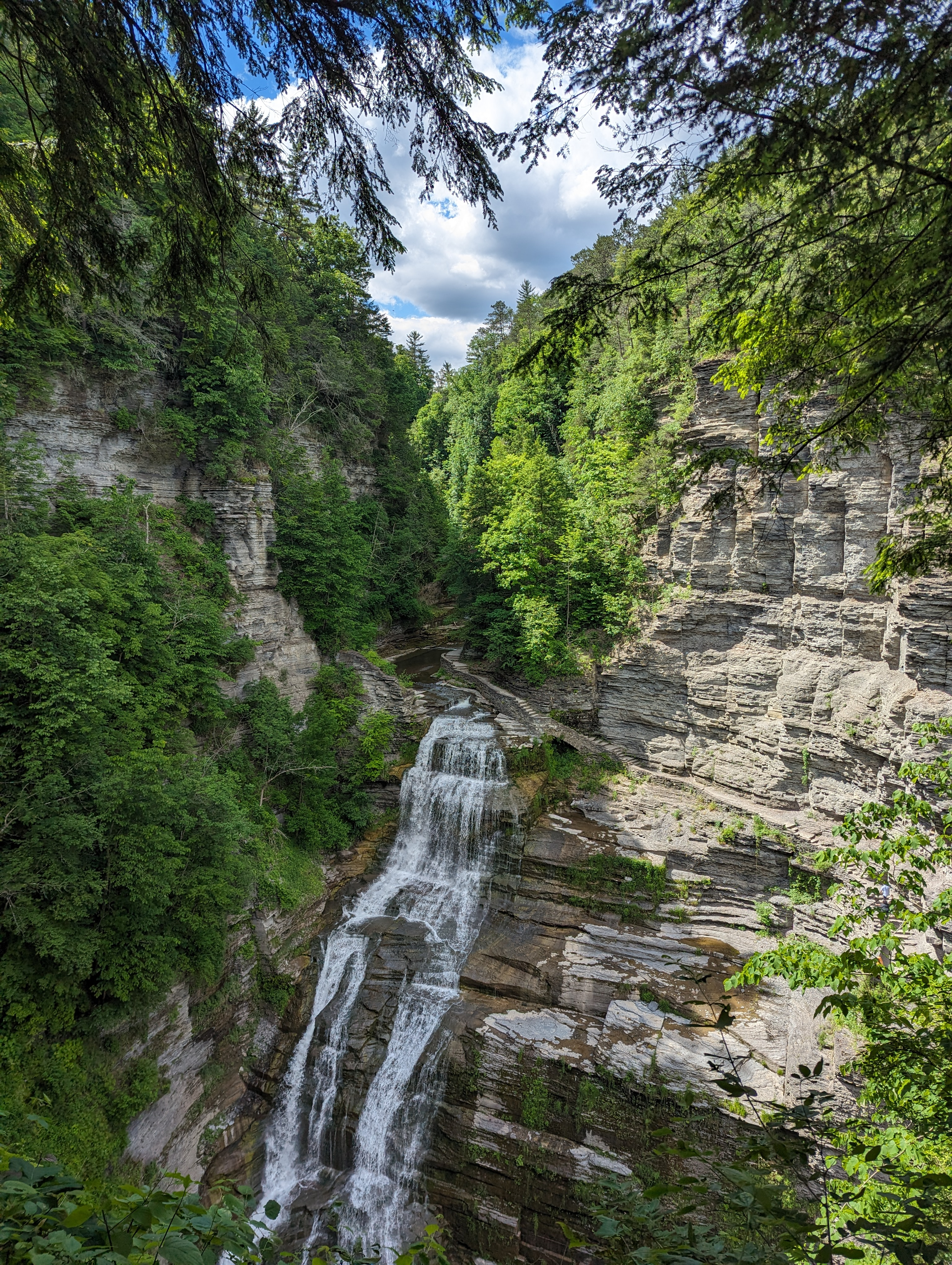
- Lucifer Falls drops 115 feet into the Enfield Creek Gorge

- Location within New York
- Type: State park
- Location: 105 Enfield Falls Road; Ithaca, New York
- Nearest city: Ithaca, New York
- Coordinates: 42°24′00″N 76°34′26″W
- Area: 1,110 acres (4.5 km^{2})
- Created: 1920
- Operator: New York State Office of Parks, Recreation and Historic Preservation
- Visitors: 365,400 (in 2025)
- Open: All year
- Camp sites: 72
- Website: Robert H. Treman State Park

Robert H. Treman State Park is a 1,110-acre (4.5 km^{2}) state park located in Tompkins County, in the Finger Lakes region of New York in the United States. The park is situated in the towns of Ithaca, Enfield and Newfield.

== History ==
Robert H. Treman first purchased land surrounding Enfield Falls in 1915, and worked to improve the property by planting over 1,000 trees. He and his wife, Laura Treman (Hosie), donated the land to New York State in 1920 for the establishment of Enfield Glen State Park. The park was renamed in Robert H. Treman's honor following his death in 1937.

The Enfield Falls Mill and Miller's House was listed on the National Register of Historic Places in 1979.

== Geology ==
The rock formations within the park are primarily made of Devonian shale and sandstone. These rocks formed in horizontal layers, creating flat slabs and angular edges as they erode and fracture.

The valley and waterfalls formed since the last ice age — within the last twenty or thirty thousands years — roughly in-line with previous streambeds. However, around Lucifer Falls, the current streambed completely deviates from its now drift-filled interglacial streambed (where the creek flowed in-between periods of glaciation). This path of new erosion is distinguished by its steep cliffs and narrow gorge.

Additional rock formations near Lucifer Falls include current ripple marks, indicating the direction the creek used to flow.

== Park description ==
Robert H. Treman State Park is located along State Route 327, just west of state routes 13, 34, and 96.

It has 12 waterfalls along a 4.5-mile (7.2 km) round-trip hike. The hiking trails follow Enfield Creek, giving many views of the rock formations in the deep, narrow gorge known as Enfield Glen. The park also offers picnic tables, playing fields, hiking and camping. As do some other parks in the region such as Fillmore Glen State Park, Stony Brook State Park and Buttermilk Falls State Park, it features a semi-natural swimming area created by a small dam; in this park, it is located at the base of the easternmost waterfall known as Lower Falls. Lucifer Falls, a 115-foot-tall (35 m), multi-tiered cascading waterfall, is a short hike from the western portion of the park. Views of Lucifer Falls can be found along the gorge trail, in addition to overlooks along the rim trail. The Finger Lakes Trail skirts the southern edge of the park.

Because of dangerous conditions created by snow and ice, most of the park's trails are inaccessible in the winter. Visitors can view Lower Falls year-round.

== Gallery ==
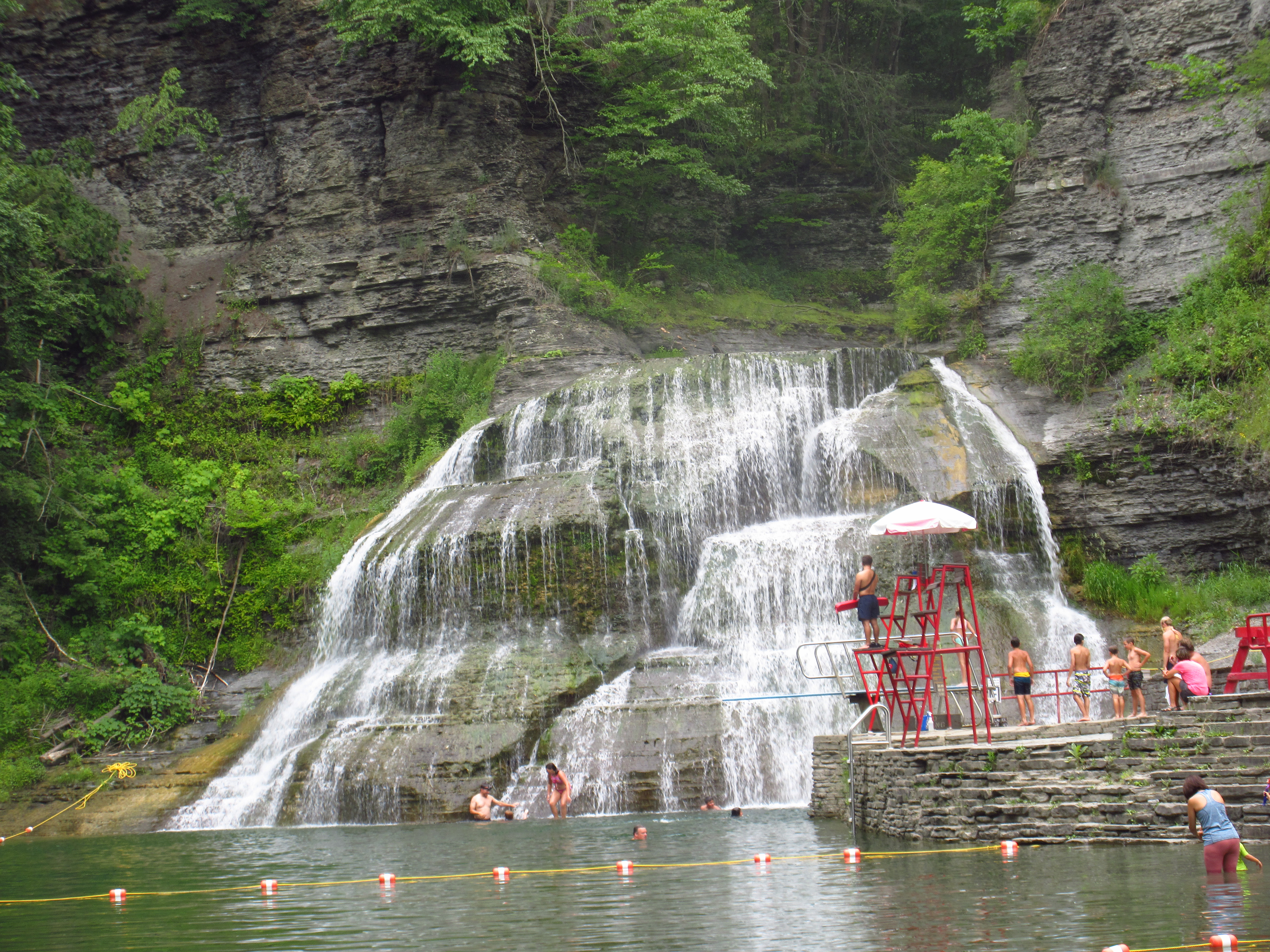
Lower Falls

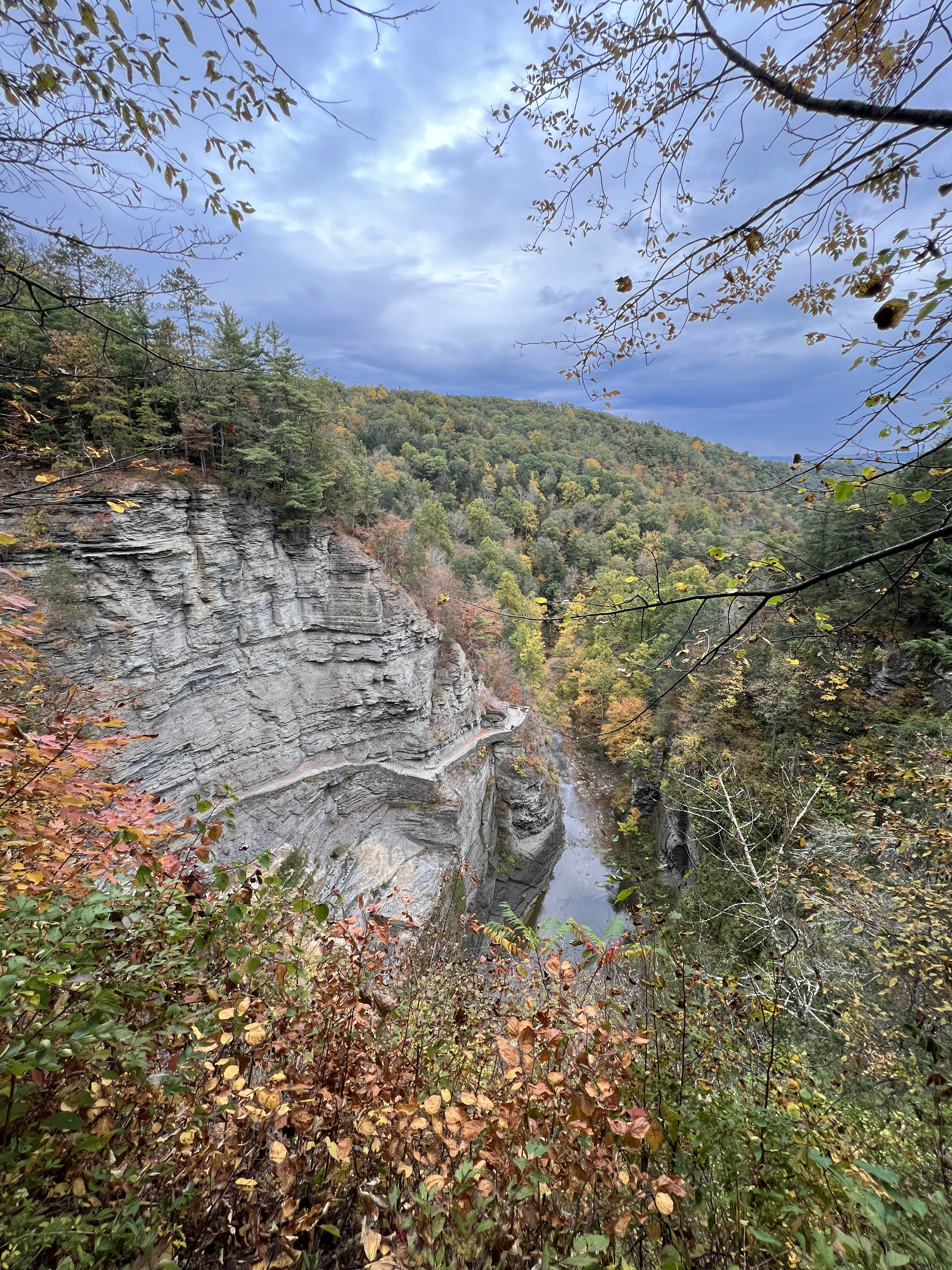

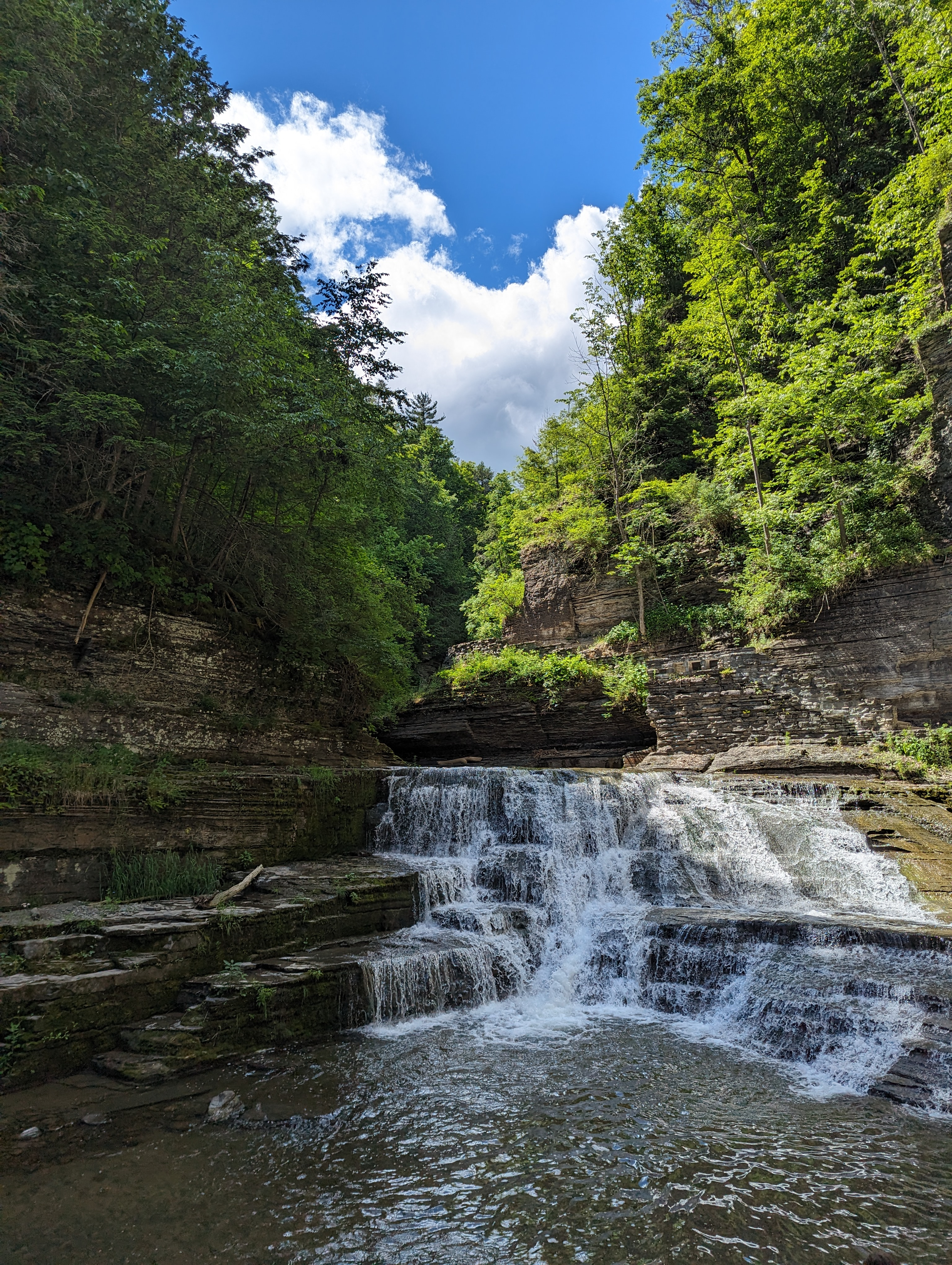
Above Lucifer Falls

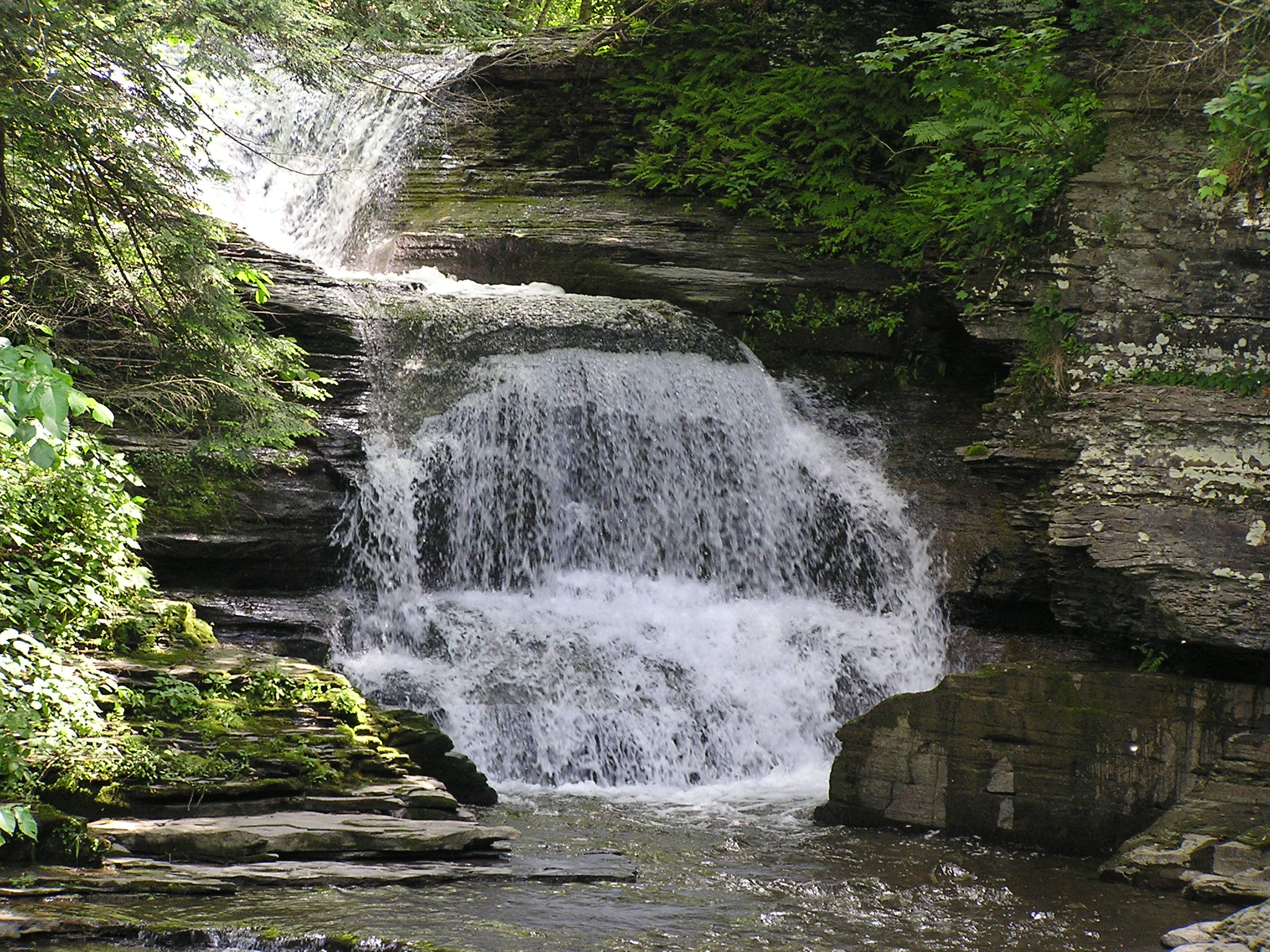
A part of Lucifer Falls

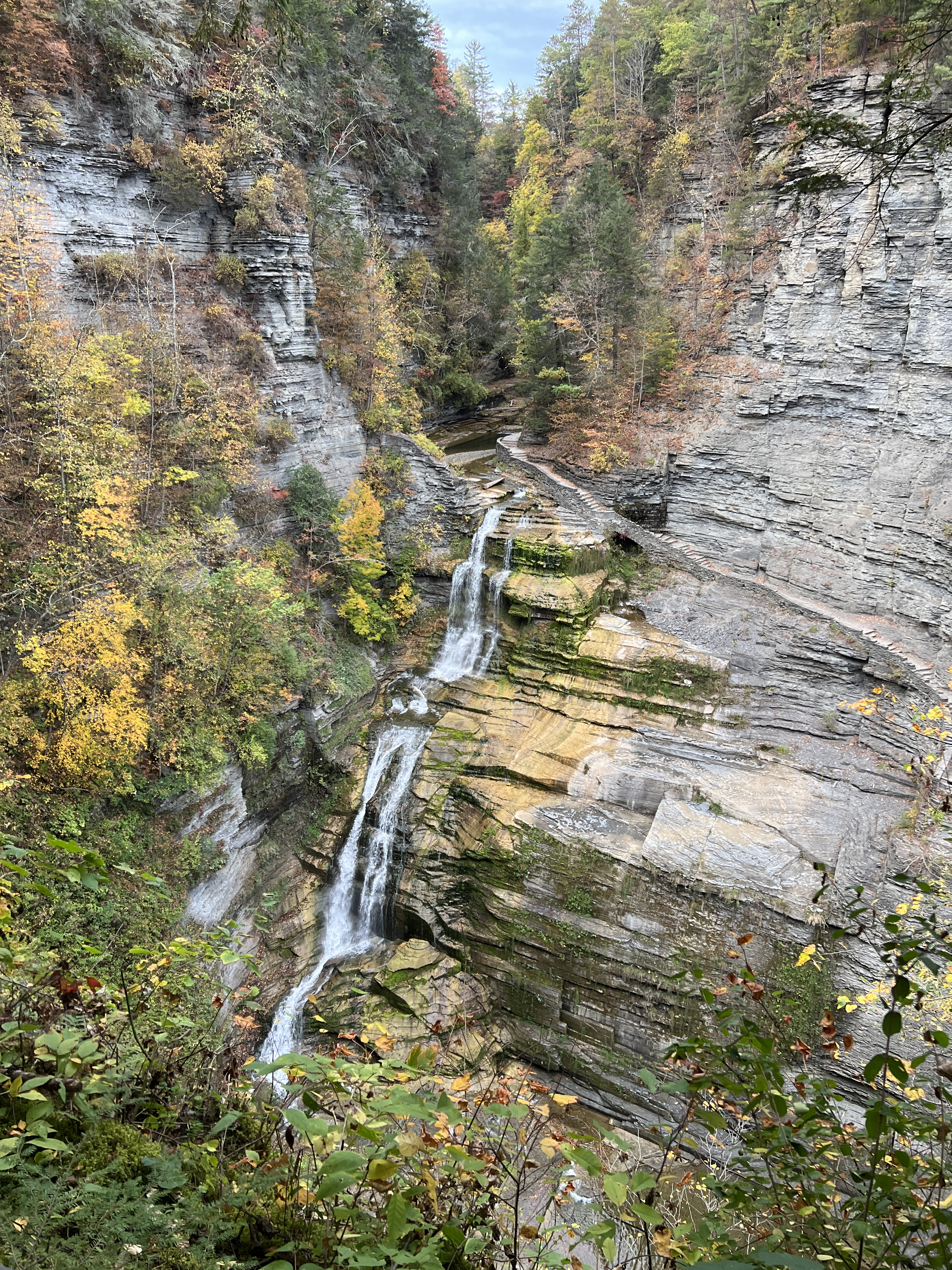
Lucifer Falls

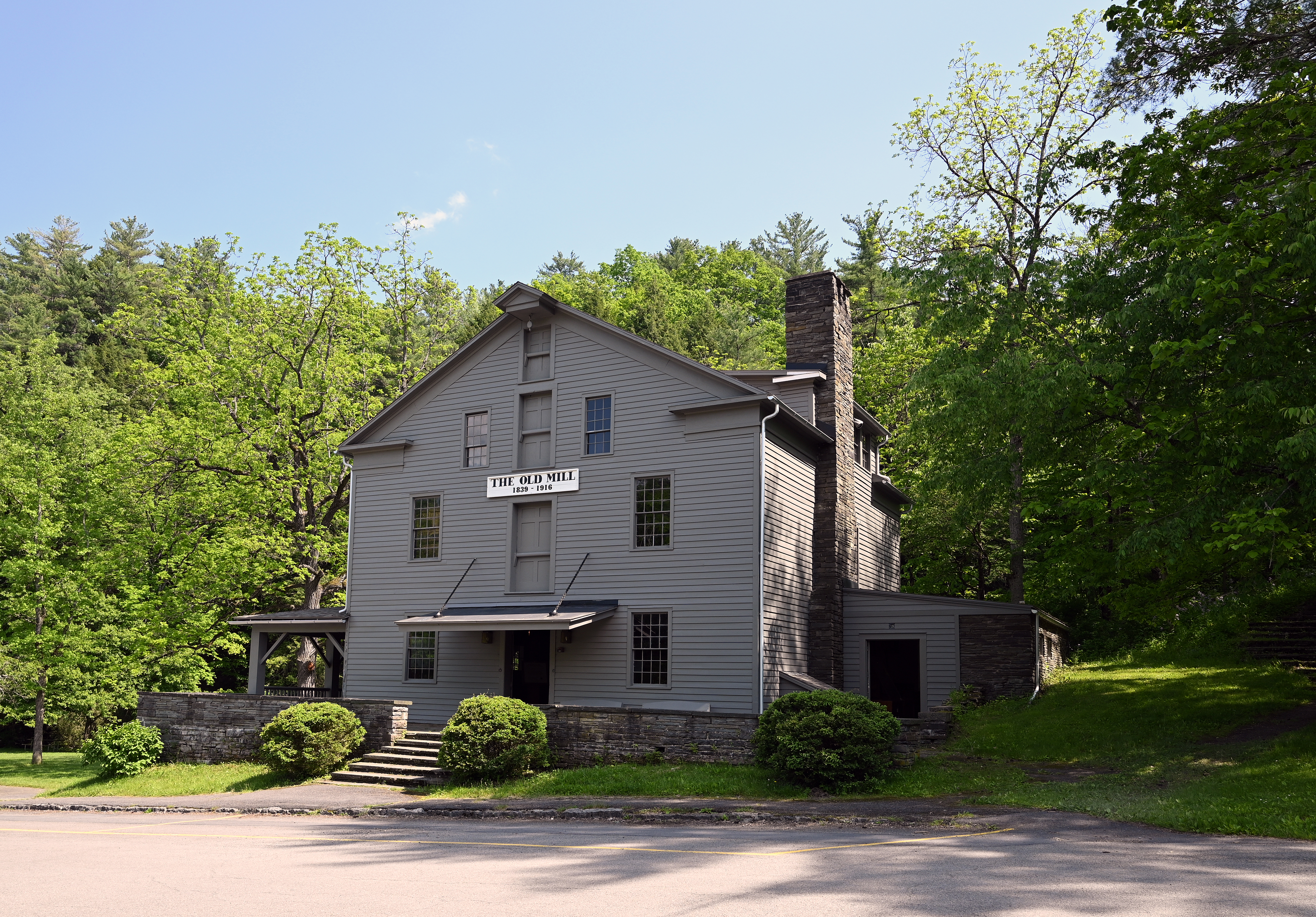
Enfield Falls Mill and Miller's House

== See also ==
- Buttermilk Falls State Park
- List of New York state parks
- List of waterfalls
