= Cayuga and Susquehanna Railroad =

Railroad in New York, United States

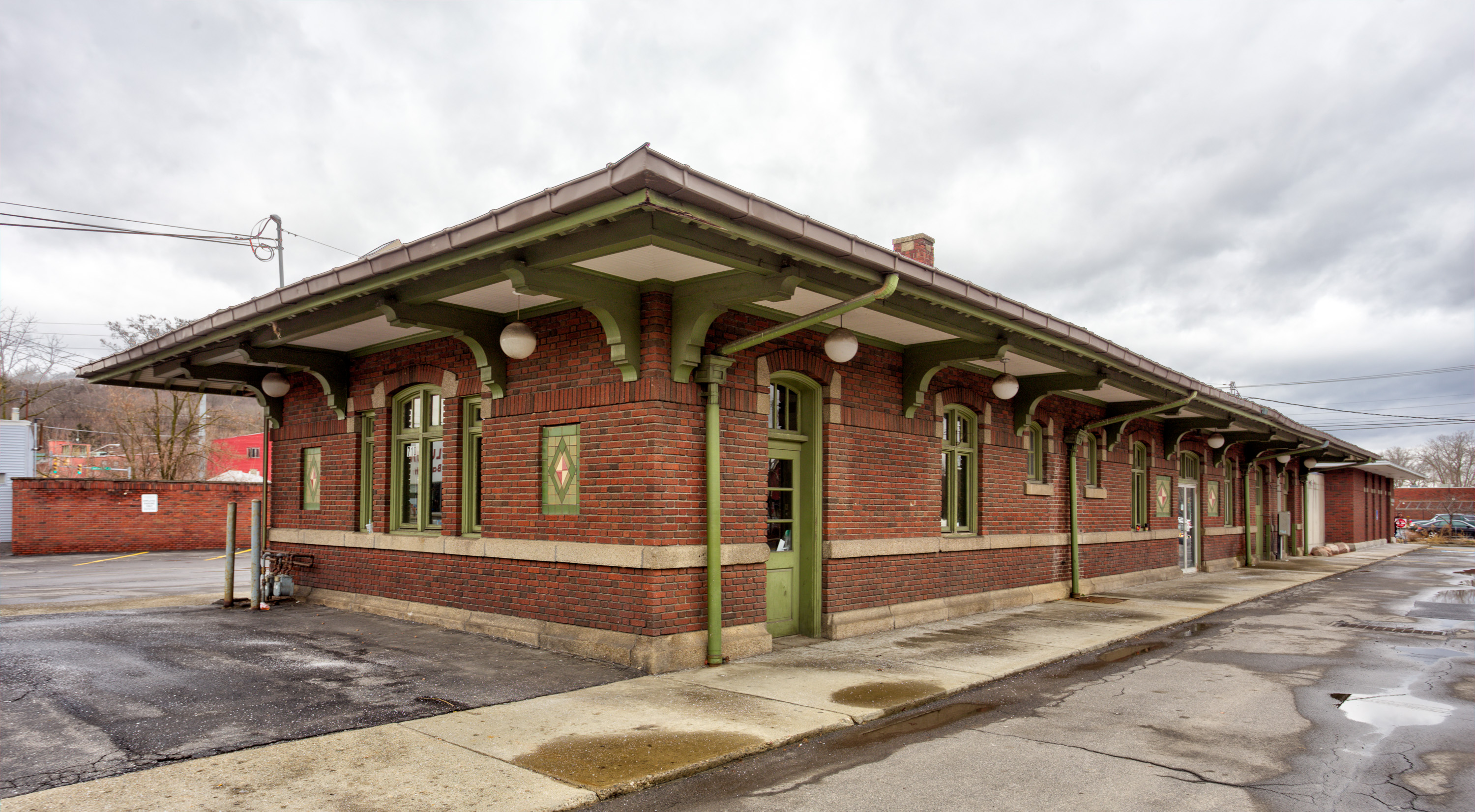
- Former station at 701 West Seneca Street in Ithaca

Overview
- Dates of operation: 1834–1976
- Successor: Conrail

Technical
- Track gauge: 4 ft 8 1/2 in (1,435 mm) standard gauge
- Length: 34 miles (55 km)

The Cayuga and Susquehanna Railroad was a railroad in the state of New York, in the United States. Its line ran from Ithaca, New York, to Owego, New York. It was founded in 1829 and began operations in 1834. The Delaware, Lackawanna and Western Railroad (Lackawanna) leased the company in 1855, but it remained in existence as a non-operating subsidiary. It was conveyed to Conrail in the bankruptcy of the Erie Lackawanna Railway, successor to the Lackawanna, in 1976.

== History ==
The railroad was chartered on January 28, 1828, as the Ithaca and Owego Railroad. It was the third railroad built in North America, and the longest of the three. It connected the town of Ithaca, on the southern shore of Cayuga Lake, with the town of Owego on the Susquehanna River to the south. By 1828, the Cayuga–Seneca Canal connected the Erie Canal to the north end of Cayuga Lake. The Ithaca and Owego was planned to provide a missing link connecting the Erie Canal and the Great Lakes to the coal fields of Pennsylvania and the Chesapeake Bay.

Little construction was done until the Chemung Canal was built along a similar course in 1833, via Seneca Lake and Elmira, diverting trade from Ithaca and Owego. At this point, construction was started and the work was completed by 1834. The chief engineer for the construction was John Randel Jr.

The track was standard gauge strap-iron rails— strips of cast iron attached to wooden rails. The line covered a distance of approximately 30 miles (48 km). It comprised an ascent from Cayuga Lake of 602 feet (183 m) in 8 miles (13 km) followed by a descent to Owego of 276 feet (84 m). Two inclined planes accomplished the lift from Ithaca, one driven by a stationary engine and the second by a horse-drawn windlass. Originally the cars were pulled by horse power, An engine, "The Pioneer", built by Walter McQueen of Albany, was purchased in 1840. This engine was in service for a few years before crashing through a bridge, killing the engineer and fireman, and the railroad returned to horse power.

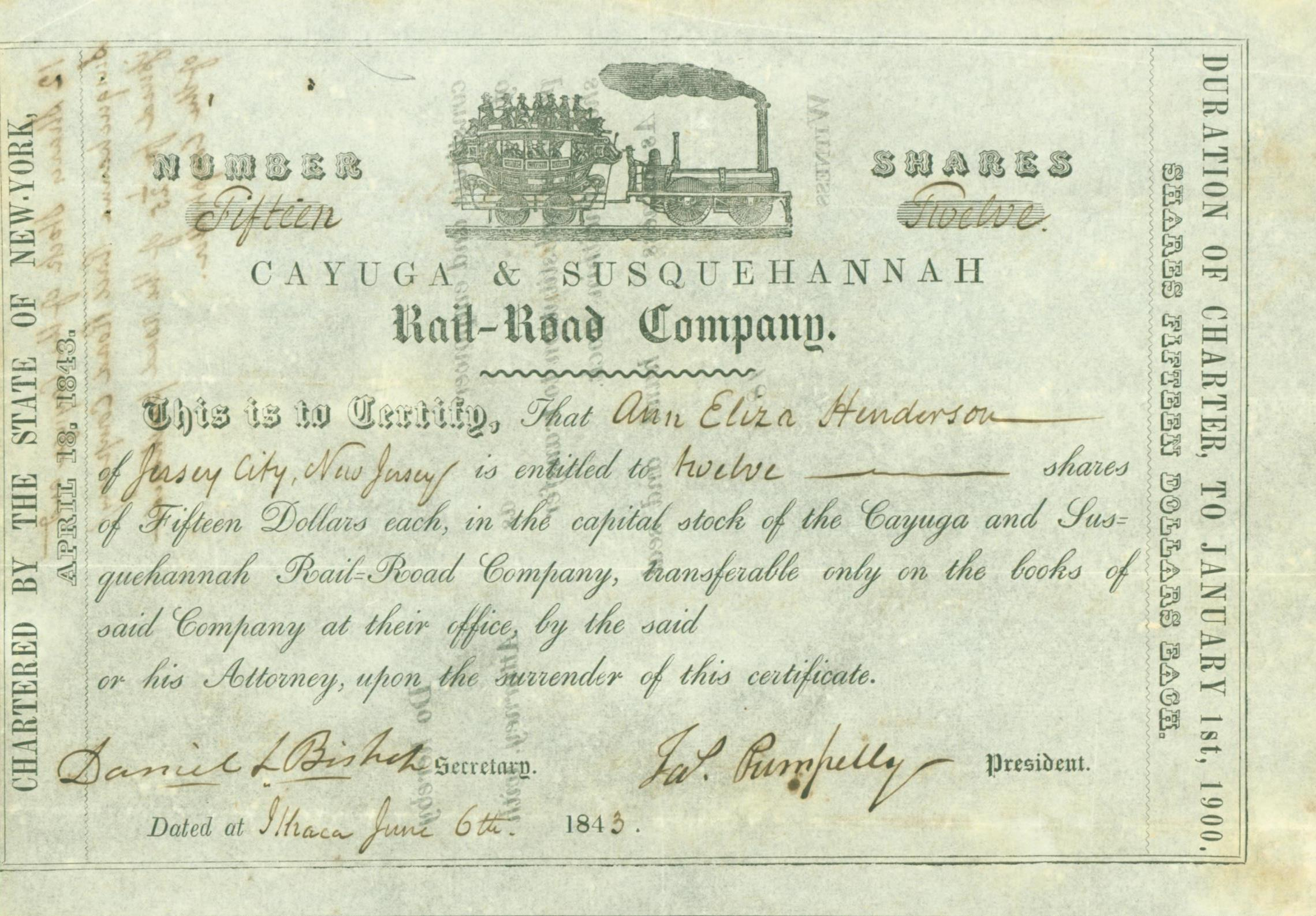
Share of the Cayuga & Susquehannah Rail-Road, issued 6 June 1843

In 1842, the railroad defaulted on its debts and was foreclosed and sold to Henry Yates and Archibald McIntyre, who reorganized the company as the Cayuga and Susquehanna Railroad. At this time the track was changed to broad gauge. The Delaware, Lackawanna and Western Railroad leased the company in 1855 and operated the line thereafter as part of its Cayuga Division. The DL&W reconstructed the line with "heavy T rails" and converted it back to standard gauge, facilitating a connection to the Erie in Owego.

In 1956, the physical right-of-way was abandoned; it would later be incorporated into the South Hill Recreation Way in Ithaca.

The company remained in existence as a non-operating subsidiary through the merger with the Erie Railroad in 1960 to form the Erie Lackawanna Railway. It was conveyed to Conrail in 1976 in the Erie Lackawanna's bankruptcy.
