= Buttermilk Falls State Park =

State park in New York state, United States

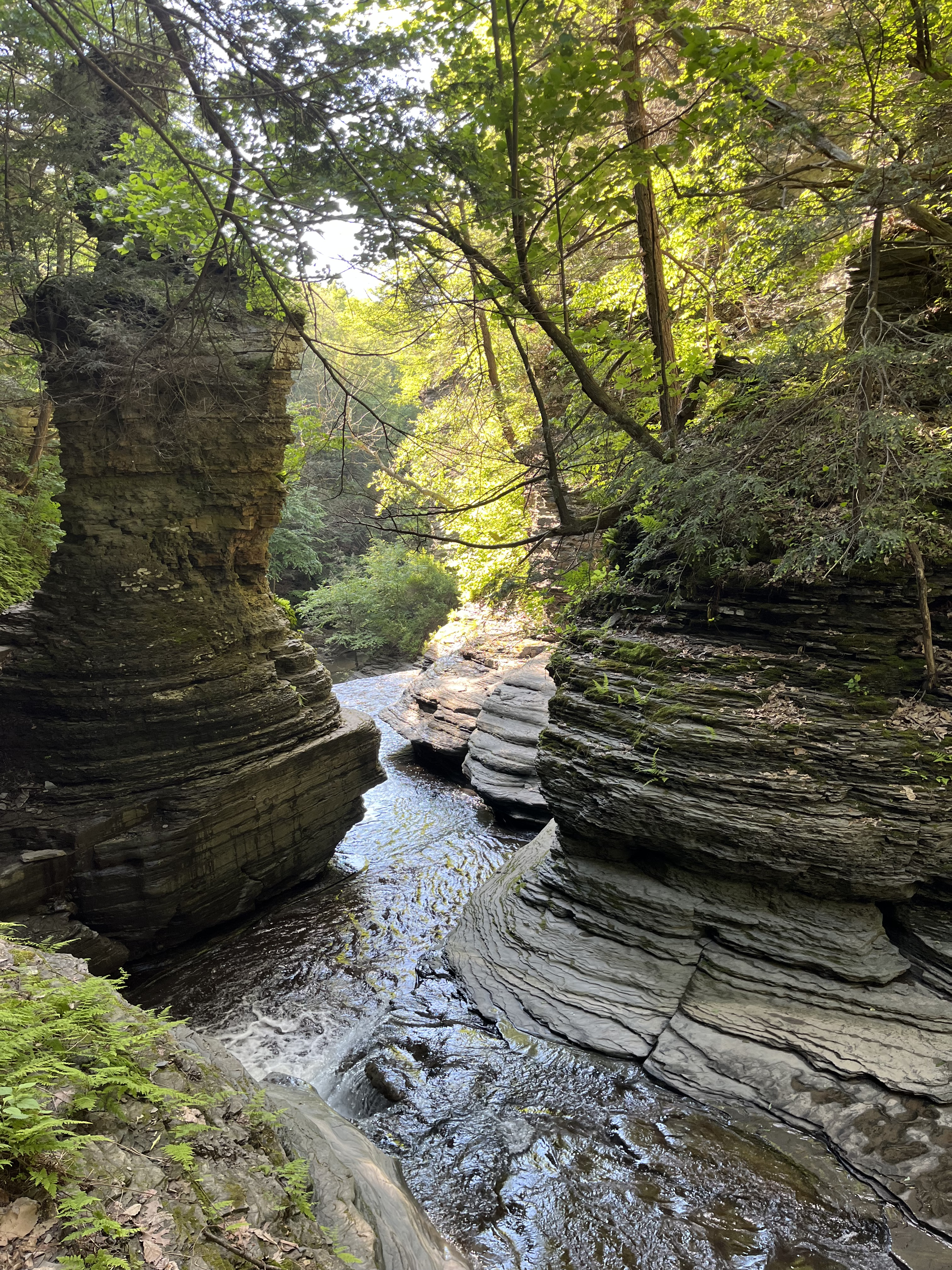
- Buttermilk Falls, June 2022

- Location within New York
- Type: State park
- Location: 112 East Buttermilk Falls Road; Ithaca, New York
- Nearest city: Ithaca, New York
- Coordinates: 42°24′N 76°32′W
- Area: 811 acres (3.28 km^{2})
- Created: 1924
- Operator: New York State Office of Parks, Recreation and Historic Preservation
- Visitors: 379,423 (in 2025)
- Website: Buttermilk Falls State Park

Buttermilk Falls State Park is a 811-acre (3.28 km^{2}) state park located southwest of Ithaca, New York, United States. Like Robert H. Treman State Park, a portion of the land that was to become the state park came from Robert and Laura Treman in 1924.

== History ==
Buttermilk Falls was named for the frothy appearance of its churning waters. The naming of the cascade was described in 1866:

Here cleft by a mountain torrent, that comes pouring over the sharp rocks of its bed in a mass of thick, frothy foam, that evidently suggested to the unaesthetic and domestic countryman the name of Buttermilk Falls.

The original 164 acres (0.66 km^{2}) of the park were presented as a gift to New York State by Robert and Laura Treman in 1924. It grew to its current 811-acre (3.28 km^{2}) size through various state acquisitions in the years that followed.

== Geology ==
The rock formations within the park are primarily made of Devonian shale and sandstone. These rocks formed in horizontal layers, creating flat slabs and angular edges as they erode and fracture. The gorge and waterfalls formed since the last ice age — within the last twenty or thirty thousands years — as Buttermilk Creek eroded back from the head of a hanging valley. Additional formations along the creek include potholes and a stack called "Pinnacle Rock".

== Park description ==
Buttermilk Falls State Park features 10 waterfalls in total, with Buttermilk Falls being the main attraction. The park also offers a beach, cabins, fishing, hiking, deer bow-hunting, nature trails, pavilions, a playground, playing fields, recreation programs, and a campground with tent and trailer sites.

=== Trails ===
The nature trails in the park include Gorge Trail, which follows Buttermilk Creek as it cascades, dropping about 600 feet (180 m) along the trail. Gorge Trail is complemented by Rim Trail on the other side of the creek, which make for a loop of about 1.5 miles (2.4 km). Beyond these two trails is the Bear Trail which continues up Buttermilk Creek to Lake Treman Falls and Lake Treman. The trail to and around the lake is another 1.5 miles (2.4 km). At the far end of the lake is a spur of the Finger Lakes Trail. Another trail in the park is the Larch Trail, which circles a marsh near the main (lower) parking area and is about one mile (1.6 km) in length.

== Gallery ==
Falls of Buttermilk State Park

Foaming cascade of Buttermilk Falls

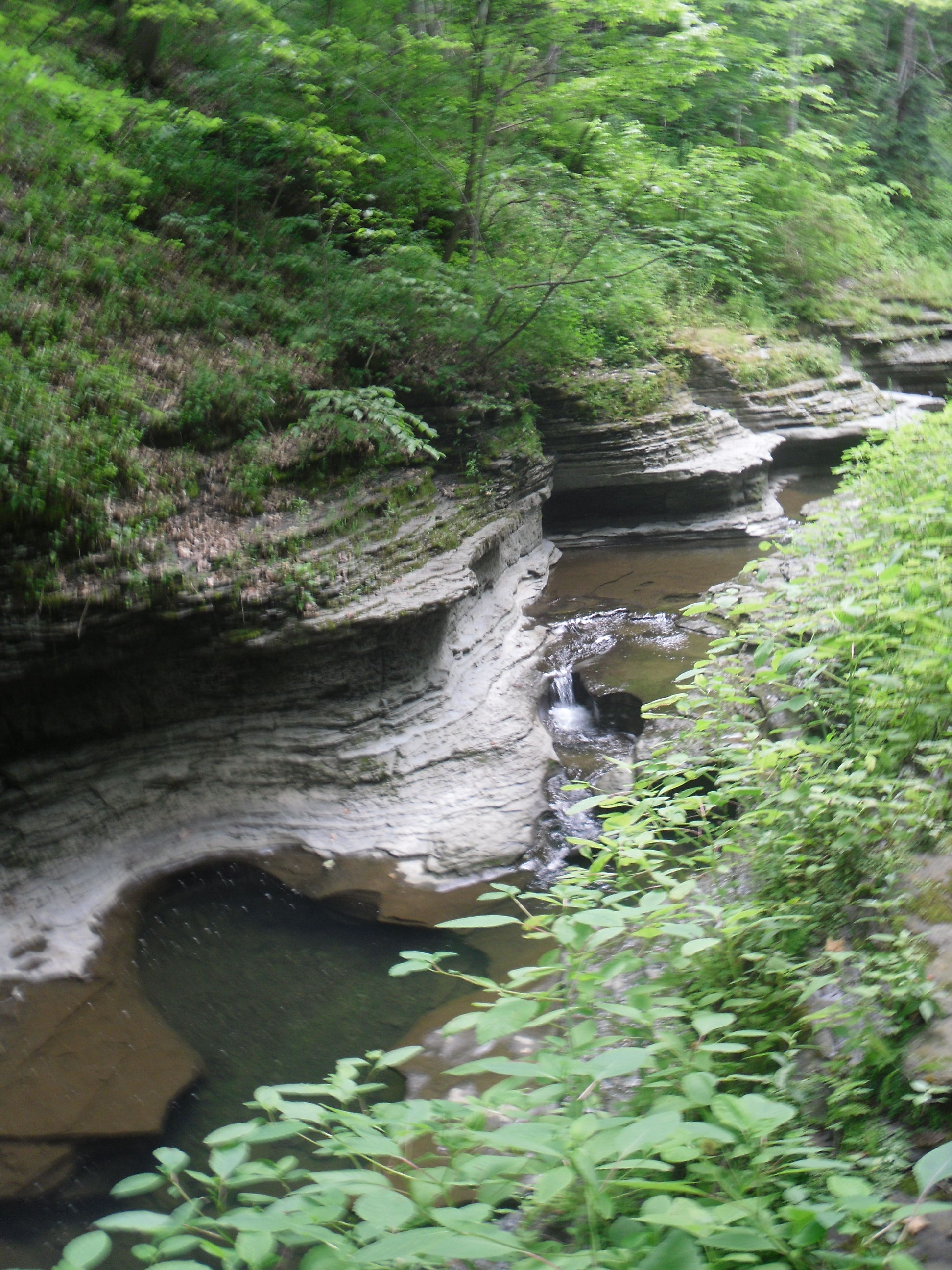

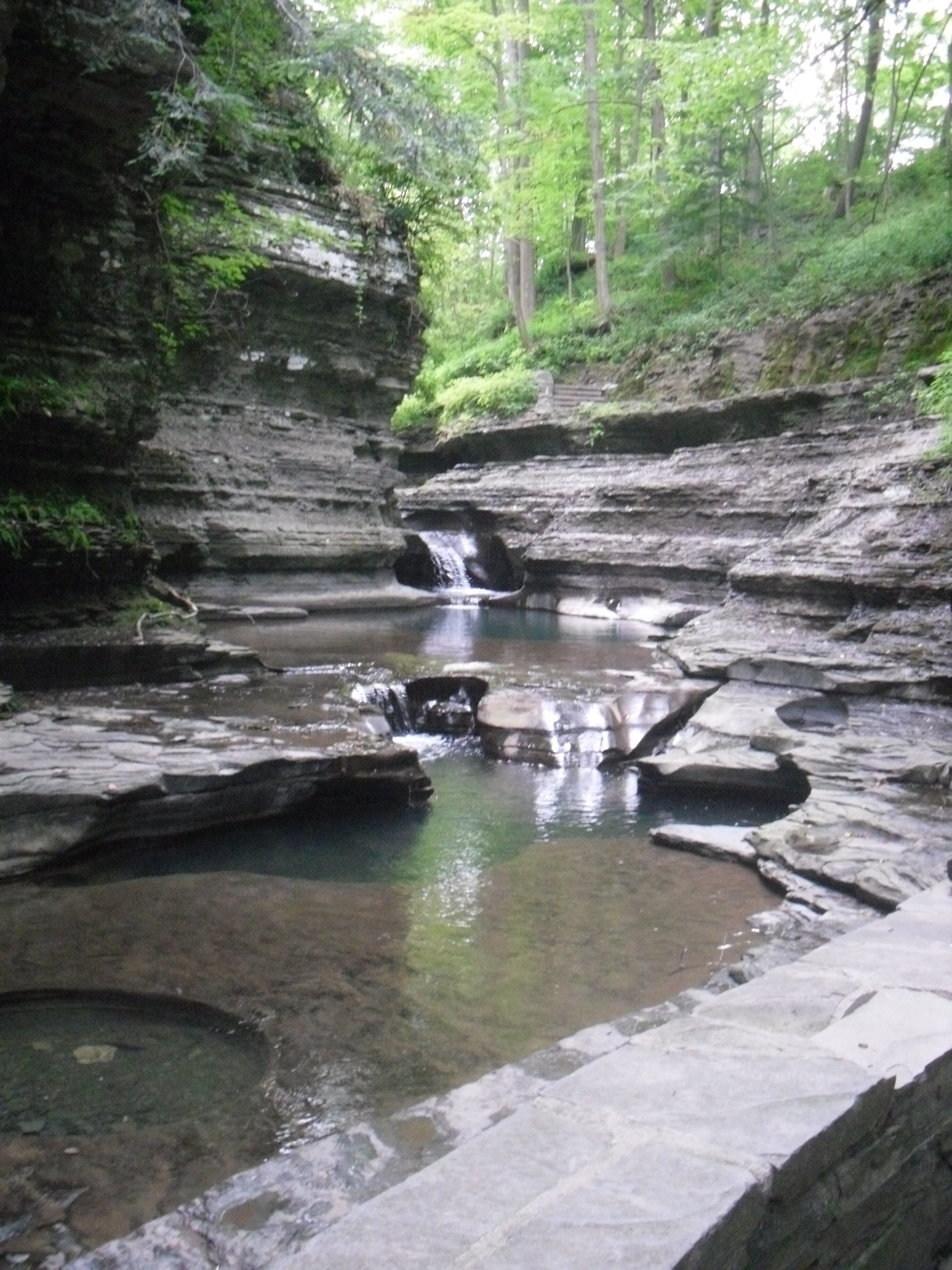

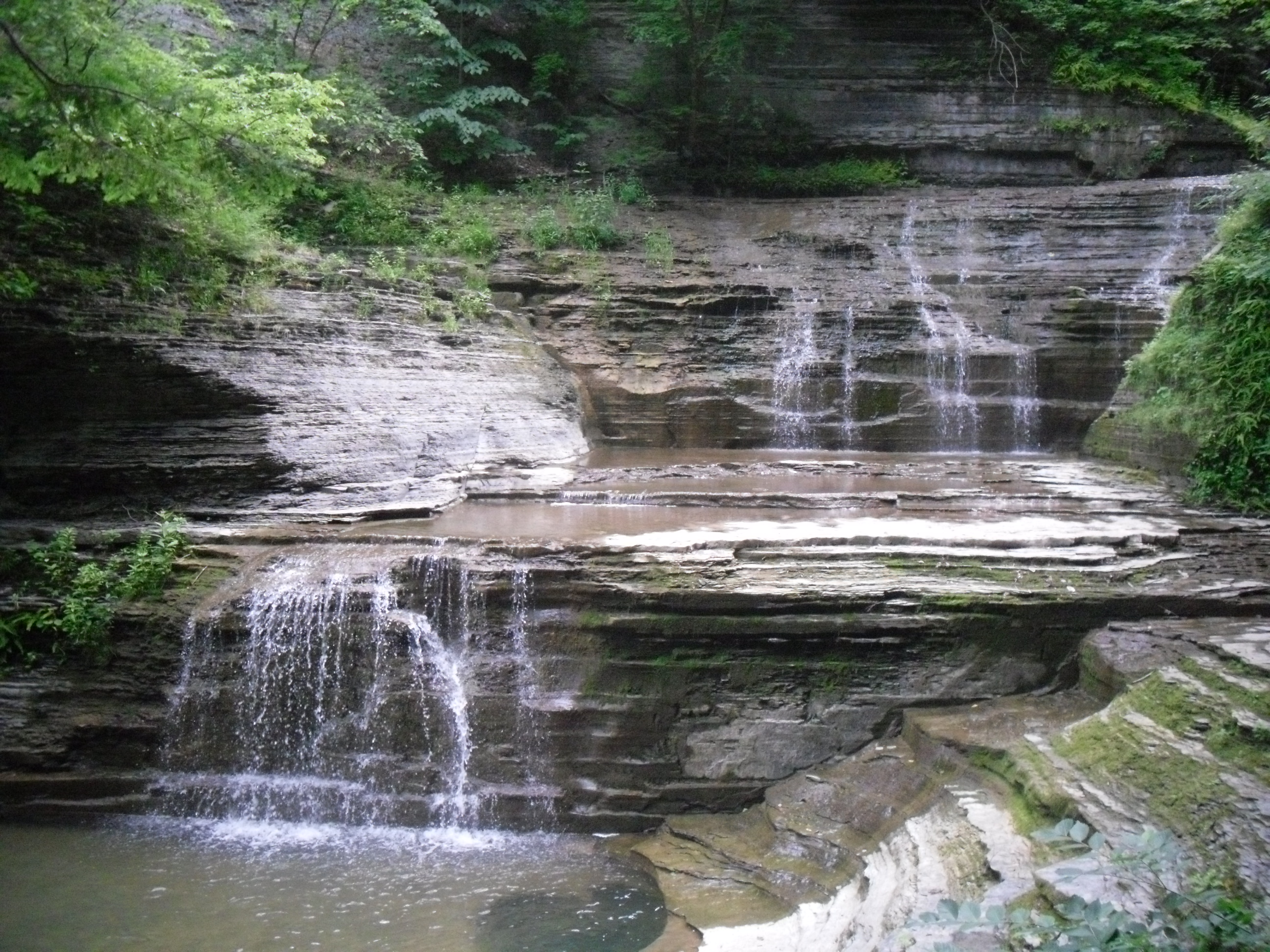

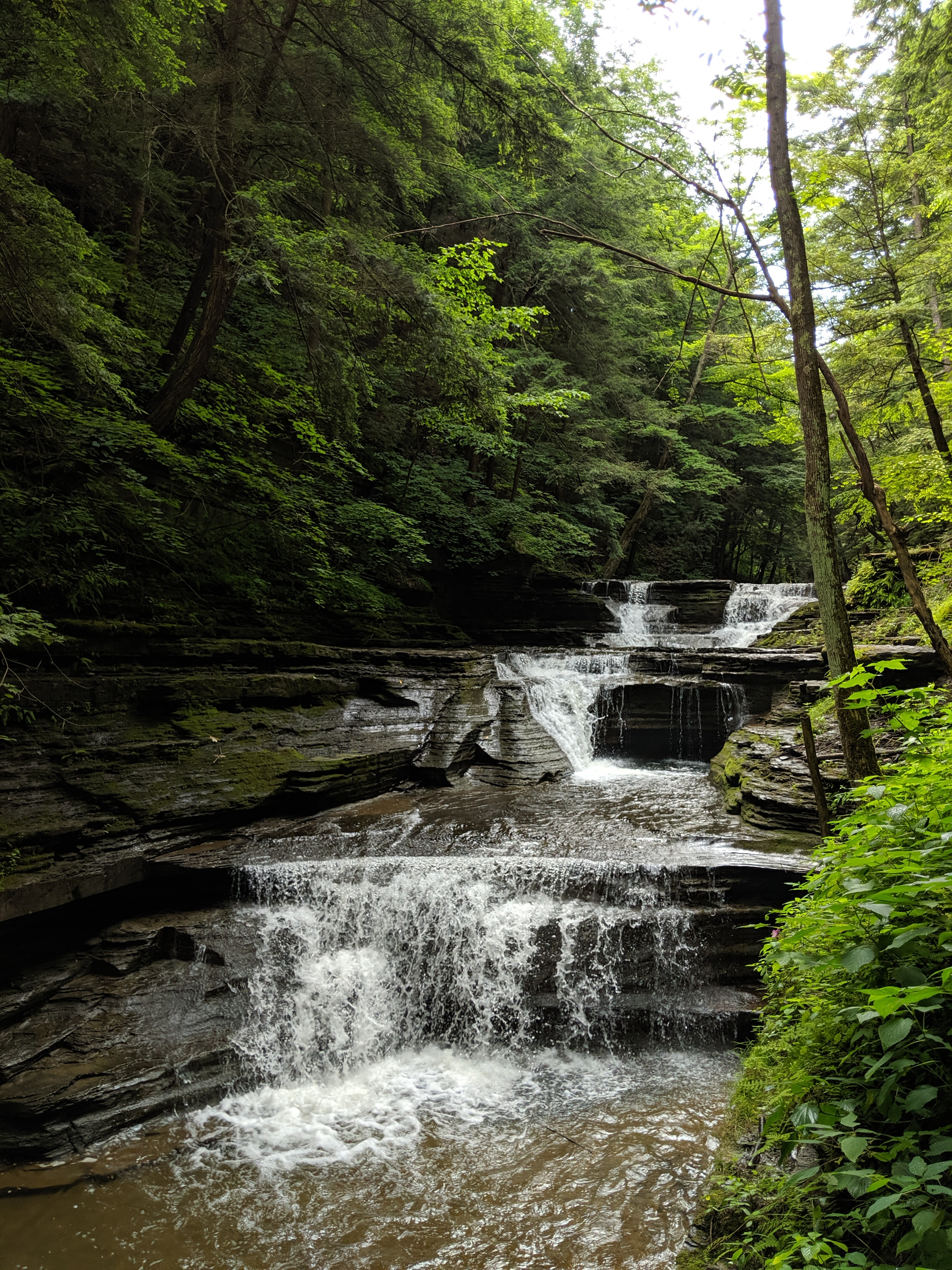
Falls in the Upper Gorge

== See also ==
- List of New York state parks
- List of waterfalls
- Trails in Ithaca, New York
