= Enfield Falls Mill and Miller's House =

Historic house in New York, United States

- U.S. National Register of Historic Places
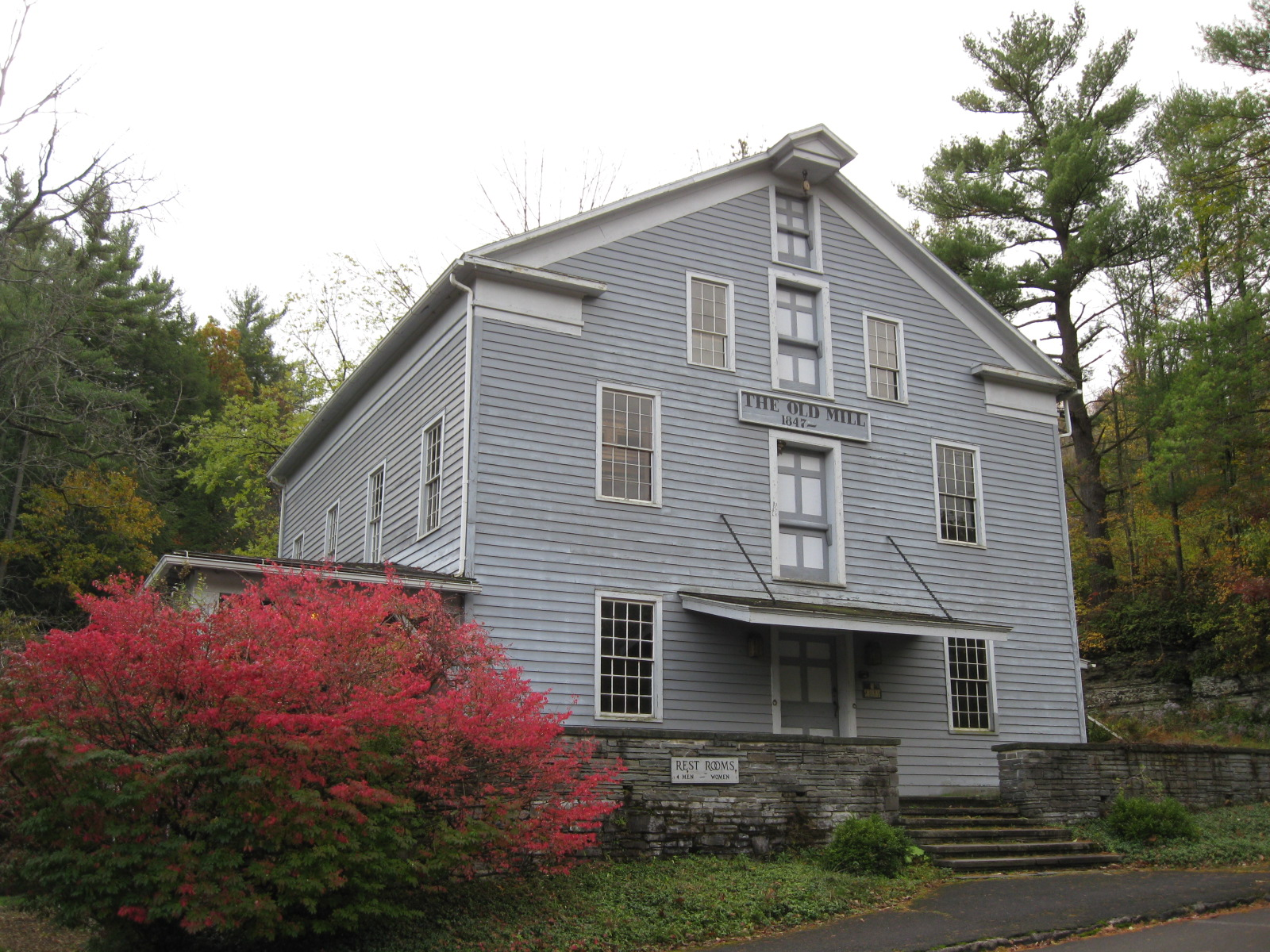
- Enfield Falls Mill, October 2009

- Location within New York Location within the United States
- Nearest city: Ithaca, New York
- Coordinates: 42°24′5″N 76°35′26″W
- Area: 13 acres (5.3 ha)
- Built: 1839
- Architectural style: Greek Revival, Greek Revival vernacular
- NRHP reference No.: 79001637
- Added to NRHP: February 25, 1979

Enfield Falls Mill and Miller's House, also known as Treman House and Mill, is a historic grist mill and former mill-owner's residence located at Robert H. Treman State Park near Ithaca in Tompkins County, New York. The mill is a 2 1/2-story frame structure over a stone foundation. It is a turbine-powered mill constructed in 1839. The mill has three runs of stones: one for grinding buckwheat, one for grinding wheat, and a third for grinding coarser grain. The mill ceased operation in 1917. The mill-owner's house is a simple but elegant vernacular Greek Revival–style dwelling. The house consists of a 1 1/2-story main section, with a slightly lower L-shaped wing. It serves as home for the park superintendent.

It was listed on the National Register of Historic Places in 1979.
