= Fillmore Glen State Park =

State park in Cayuga County, New York

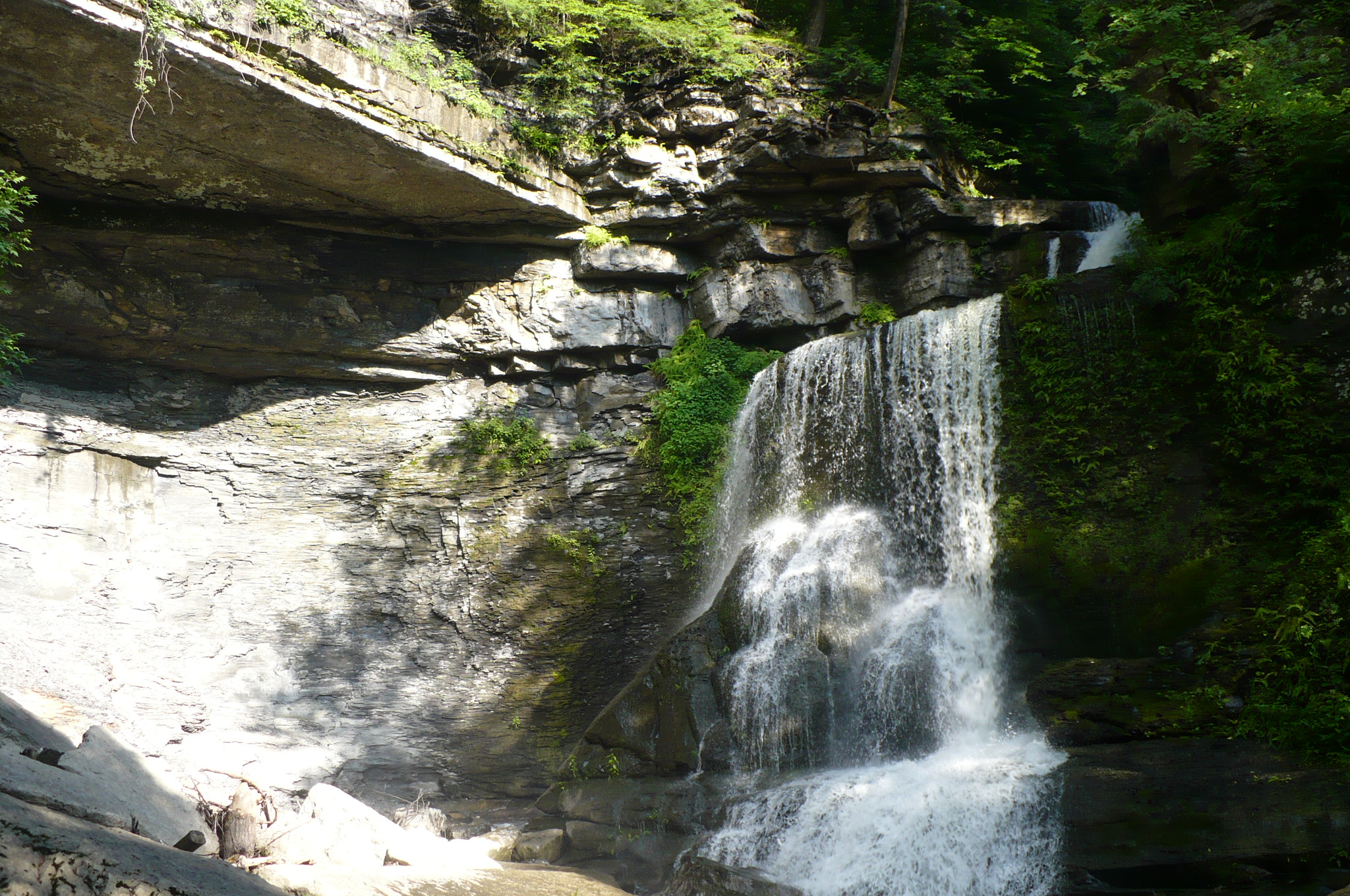
- The Cowsheds, a waterfall at Fillmore Glen State Park. Reputedly, cattle would shelter against the cliff to the left on hot summer days in years past.

- Location within New York
- Type: State park
- Location: 1686 State Route 38; Moravia, New York
- Nearest city: Ithaca, New York
- Coordinates: 42°42′N 76°25′W
- Area: 941 acres (3.81 km^{2})
- Created: 1925
- Operator: New York State Office of Parks, Recreation and Historic Preservation
- Visitors: 83,044 (in 2014)
- Open: All year
- Camp sites: 60
- Website: Fillmore Glen State Park

Fillmore Glen State Park is a 941-acre (3.81 km^{2}) state park located in the Finger Lakes region of New York adjacent to the Village of Moravia in Cayuga County.

== Park description ==
The primary attractions of the park are the hiking trails with views of a stream and five waterfalls, in addition to the swimming pond, made by damming the stream. It also features a replica of President Millard Fillmore's boyhood log cabin, as the park is about five miles (8 km) from the former president's birthplace.

The park offers swimming, picnic tables and pavilions, cabins, a campground with 60 tent and trailer sites, hunting and fishing, hiking, a playground, snowmobiling, and cross-country skiing.

== See also ==
- List of New York state parks
