= Wetherell =

Wetherell is an English surname, and may refer to:

- Sir Charles Wetherell (1770–1846), English lawyer, politician and judge
- Chris Wetherell, musician in American rock bands Dealership and Citizens Here and Abroad
- Elizabeth Wetherell, pen name of Susan Warner (1819–1885), American evangelical writer
- Eric Wetherell (1925–2021), British conductor, composer, author
- Ernest Wetherell (1893–1969), Australian politician
- Frank E. Wetherell, American architect
- Ginger Wetherell (born 1947), American businesswoman and politician
- Gordon Wetherell (born 1948), British diplomat, governor of the Turks and Caicos Islands
- Henry Wetherell (1775–1857), British Anglican priest, Archdeacon of Hereford
- Ian Colin Wetherell, birth name of Ian Colin (1910–1987), British film and television actor
- Joe Wetherell (1880–unknown), English footballer
- Kenneth Alwyn Wetherell (1925-2020), British conductor and composer
- Manoli Wetherell (radio), New York Bureau Chief Engineer for National Public Radio
- Margaret Wetherell, British discourse analyst
- Marmaduke Wetherell (1884–1939), British–South African actor, screenwriter, film director and big-game hunter alleged to have committed a Loch Ness Monster hoax
- Nathan Wetherell (1726–1808), Vice-Chancellor of the University of Oxford
- Nathan Wetherell (cricketer) (1808–1887), English amateur cricketer
- Nathaniel Wetherell (1800–1875), British geologist and surgeon
- T. Kent Wetherell II (born 1970), American judge
- T. K. Wetherell (1945-2018), American educational administrator and politician
- Virginia Wetherell (born 1943), English actress
- Walter D. Wetherell (born 1948), American writer
- Steven Wetherell, English writer

== See also ==
- Manoli Wetherell, a fictionalized version of the real person featured in Marvel Comics
- Weatherall
- Wetherall
- Wetherill
