= Wetherill =

Wetherill is an English language surname, and may refer to:

- Anna Wetherill Olmsted (1888–1961), American curator and museum director
- Charles M. Wetherill, American chemist
- Christine Wetherill (1878–1922), heiress to the Pittsburgh Paint Company, dramatist and arts patron
- David Wetherill, British table tennis player
- George Wetherill, American physicist
- Louisa Wade Wetherill (1877–1945), American explorer and trader
- Marietta Palmer Wetherill (1876–1954), American anthropologist and rancher
- Richard Wetherill, American archaeologist
- Roderick Wetherill, American Army general

== See also ==
- 2128 Wetherill
- Fort Wetherill
- Wetherill Park, New South Wales
- Wetherell
- Weatherall
- Wetherall
