= Old Guard State Fencibles =

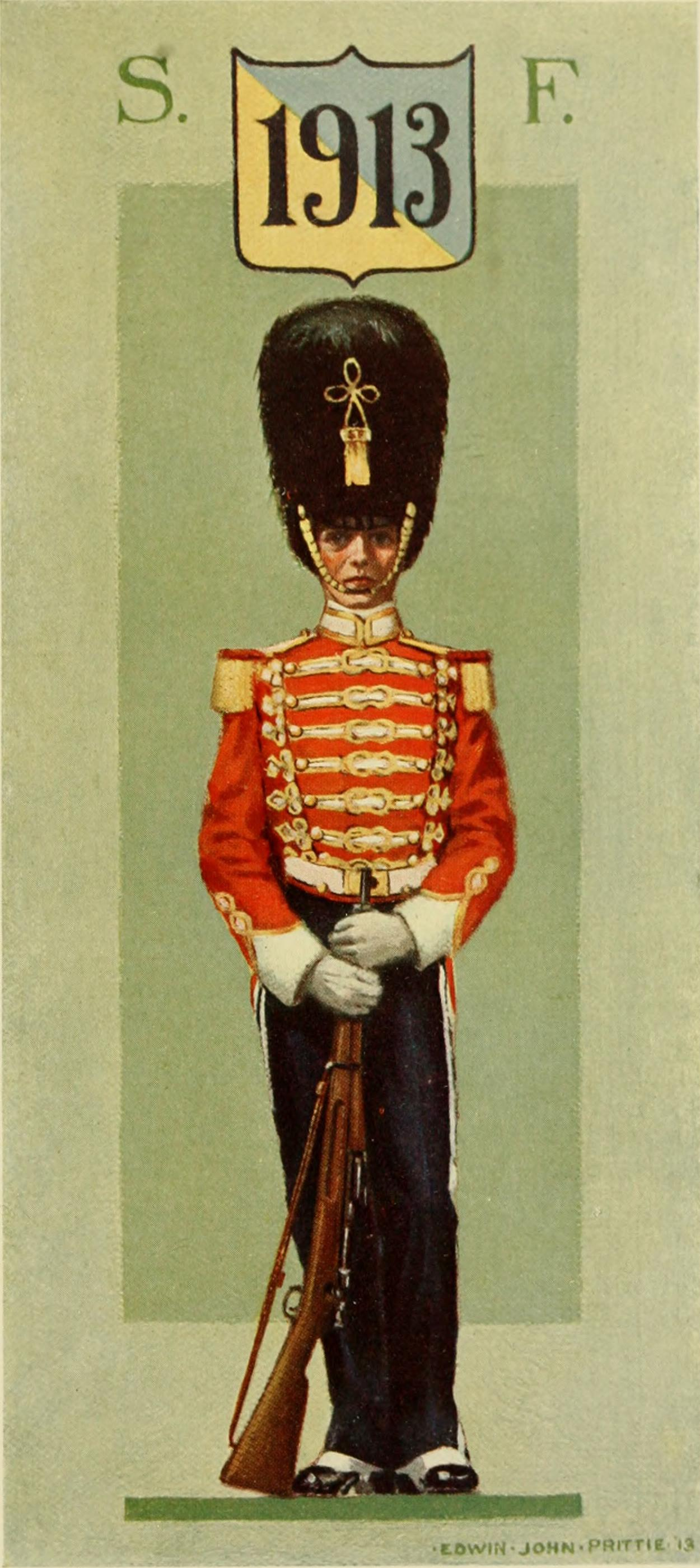
Dress uniform of the Old Guard State Fencibles

The Old Guard State Fencibles was a militia organization in Philadelphia, Pennsylvania, that existed between 1813 and 1981.

The Old Guard State Fencibles, "a military organization raised in Philadelphia in 1813 as part of the Pennsylvania militia and continued as a unit in the National Guard until independent battalions were abolished around 1900. The unit then was chartered as a Philadelphia quasi-military unit and continued as a social club. Lineage of the State Fencibles is carried on by Troop B, 1-104th Cavalry Regiment of the Pennsylvania Army National Guard."

== Organization ==
"A gentleman whose abilities and virtues, domestic and public, are the theme of universal applause and who received the undivided homage of citizens of later days, that gentleman was Joseph Reed Ingersoll. He may therefore be called, with pride, the father of the Fencibles."

== Philadelphia nativist riots ==
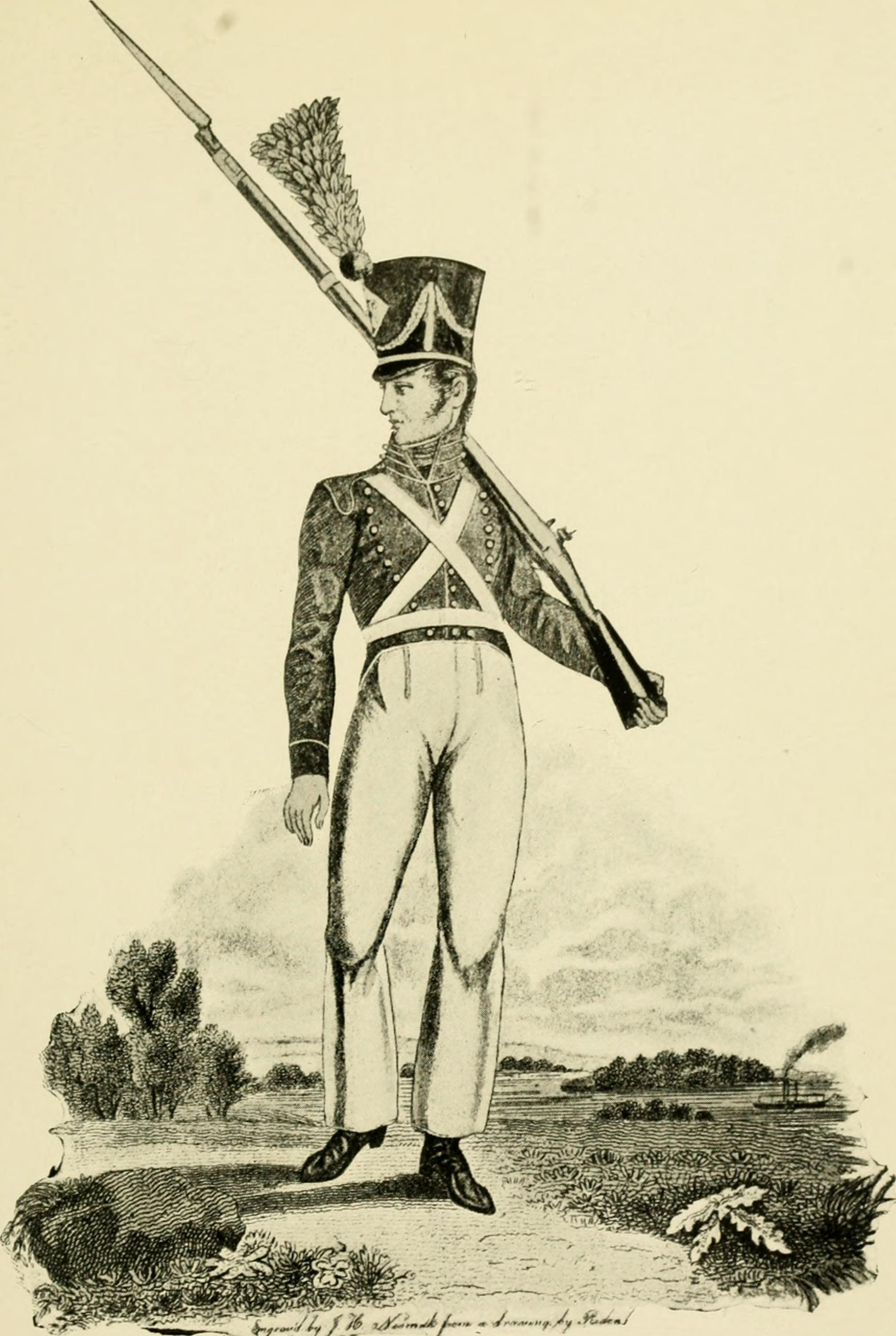
State Fencible uniforms in 1826

The Old Guard State Fencibles participated in the Philadelphia nativist riots as part of the First Infantry Regiment of the First Brigade, composed of the State Fencibles, Captain Page; Washington Blues, Captain Patterson; National Grays, Captain Fritz, and other companies, were under the command of Col. Joseph Murray.

== Mexican War ==
The State Fencibles offered their services to the governor, but the quota for Pennsylvania troops had already been met, and as a body the Fencibles were not called to active service. Many of the members then entered into the service with other units. They were: Capt. William F. Small. Capt. R. B. ]\raeey, Lieut. R. Crittendon, Lieut. Orlando Griffith, Sergt. William Rice; Privates — George Gardner, Charles B. Packer, B. P. Button, Andrew Butler, Samuel Brown, Theodore Hesser. David B. Scheble, Jacob Stapleton, James Anderson, Thomas Punston, Thomas McClintock.

== 1859 target practice illustration ==
There is an illustration of the Old Guard State Fencibles marching to a target firing exercise held by the Library Company of Philadelphia. "Scene showing the State Fencibles militia marching past the Wetherill mansion on the Fatland estate. The men march in seven lines, led by the Fencibles marching band, followed by officers, and then four lines of enlisted men fronted by a single Fencible. All the men wear uniforms and the officers wear Hardee hats, while the enlisted men wear tall, Bearskin hats. In the left foreground, a group of well-dressed men, women, and children watch the militia. In the background, other guests line the portico and verandas of the mansion. near clusters of Fencibles and spectators lining the grounds in front of the mansion. The scene also includes the trees and bushes that surround the grounds and mansion.

During the 1850s, Charles M. Wetherill, a partner in the Wetherill & Brother White Lead Works, annually invited the Fencibles to his estate for spring target firing. The June 1859 excursion included seventy-four muskets and five officers, a lunch, dinner, and dance. The State Fencibles was a military organization raised in Philadelphia in 1813 as part of the Pennsylvania militia.

In 1871, the military company, recruited under James Page, became attached to the Eighth Regiment National Guard of Pennsylvania. The Fatland seat was owned by William Bakewell beginning in 1803 before being sold to the Wetherill Family about 1821 and his death. Fatland, named for the estate's great soil fertility, remained in the Wetherill family through the early 20th century."

== Civil War ==
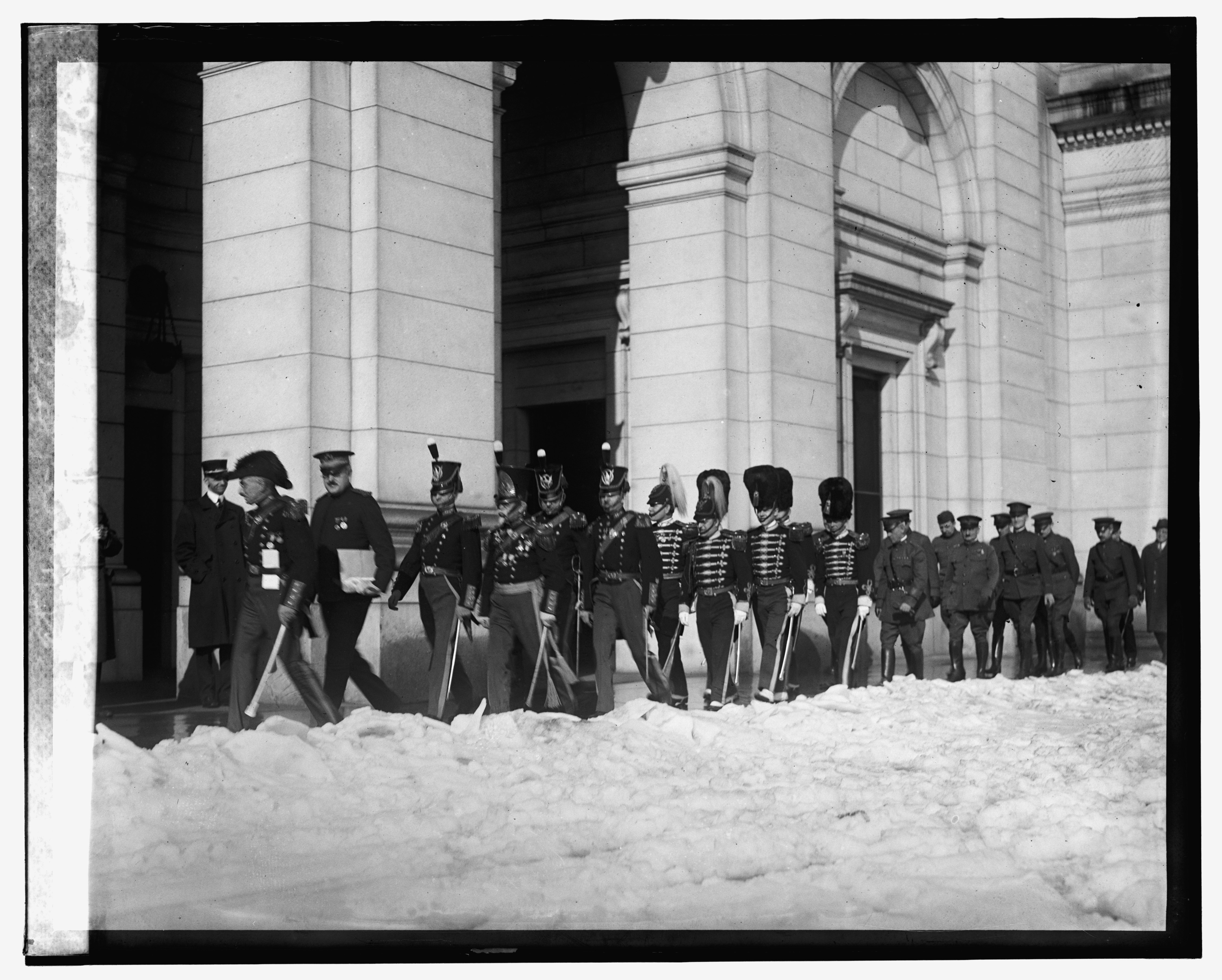
Members of the Old Guard State Fencibles at Washington Union Station in Washington, D.C. in January 1925

In 1861, at the beginning of the American Civil War, the State Fencibles began training. "The original Company being full, an additional Company was organized, and on April 24th, both companies were mustered into the United States service, for the period of three months by Captain Neill... Out of 85 officers and men who were active members before the war, 62 entered the U. S. service in the three months campaign; 68 were elected into the Corps after the President's Proclamation, from which the second Company was formed, and the Companies were lettered E and K, 18th Regt. Company E, commanded by Capt. John Miller and Co. K, by Capt. Theo Hesser. The Corps furnished the Government during the war 177 of its members, 28 of its retired members taking up the sword in defense of the Flag, making a total of 205. It is stated with much satisfaction that the active members to the number of 23 who did not enter the three months service, all but three afterward served the Government in the three-year service, fully sustaining our Latin motto, "Spectamur Agendo." (To be tried by our Actions) and preserved their ancient record that they were soldiers for war as well as for peace. The two Companies E and K, left the city on the night of May 14, with the 18th Pa. Regiment, and the 19th and 20th Regiments which formed the Brigade. They were landed at Locust Point, near Baltimore, and at once went under canvas."

After the three month's service was up, many of the men re-joined the service in the 82nd Pennsylvania Infantry, also known as the "State Fencible Regiment". Other men in the regiment went with Captain Theodore Hesser into the 72nd Pennsylvania Infantry regiment.

== Pittsburgh and Scranton riots ==
The Old Guard State Fencibles were called out by the governor of Pennsylvania to help keep the peace during the Scranton general strike of 1877.

== Homestead strike ==
The Old Guard State Fencibles were called out by the governor of Pennsylvania to restore order during the Homestead strike of 1892.

== Philadelphia trolley strike 1910 ==
The Old Guard State Fencibles were called out with the National Guard to restore peace and to guard state and private property during the Philadelphia general strike in 1910.

== Spanish American War ==
"The Sixth Regiment Infantry, as a National Guard organization, was an eight-company regiment, but at the time of its entrance into the service of the United States it was augmented by the addition of the State Fencibles Battalion of four companies, making the Sixth Regiment Pennsylvania Volunteer Infantry the only twelve company regiment originally mustered into the United States service from Pennsylvania." Company A of the State Fencibles became Company K of the 6th Pennsylvania US Volunteers; Company B became Company M of the 6th Pennsylvania US Volunteers; Company C of the State Fencibles became Company L of the 6th Pennsylvania US Volunteers; Company D of the State Fencibles became Company D of the 6th Pennsylvania US Volunteers.

== Bibliography ==
- Aledo, Marcus F. The State Fencibles Flag Presentation March. Philadelphia: Lee & Walker, 1860. Notes: Cover title. For piano. "As performed by the Philadelphia Band no. 1 on the occasion of the presentation of a suite of colors to the Battalion of State Fencibles"—Cover. "Composed and respectfully dedicated to Col. James Page"—Cover. Description: 1 score (5 pages).
- Chew, William W. State Fencibles: A Few Points on Guard Duty. 1887. Description: 22 pages; 14 cm.
- J. J. [Colonel James Page: State Fencibles Philada.] : [Pencilled in Below Portrait]. [Place of publication not identified]: J.J. [on stone], 1839. Description: 1 print: lithograph; 22.8 x 18.6 cm.
- Johnson, Francis, and Daniel Nightingale. The State Fencibles: Captain Page : Kent bugle quick step. [United States]: D. Nightingale, 1988. Notes: Originally for band. Description: 1 score (14 pages); 37 cm. Notes: For voice and piano. Subsequent verses printed as text on p. [3]. At head of title, monochrome lithograph of the firing on Fort McHenry with a boy in foreground. Lithography by Lehman & Duval Lithrs. Phila. "Humbly dedicated to Col. James Page, Commanding the State Fencibles of Philadelphia"—Caption. James G. Osbourn's Music Saloon was at 30 S. 4th Street, Philadelphia, Pa. between 1835 and 1842. Cf. Handbook of Early American Sheet music 1768-1889 / Dichter and Shapiro. Description: 1 score ([3] pages): illustrations; 34 cm. Other Titles: Father look up and see that flag; It is your country's flag. American sentinel (Philadelphia, Pa.: Daily).
- Johnson, Francis, and James Page. The American boy: a new patriotic song from the American Sentinel. Philadelphia (No. 30 South 4th St, Philadelphia): J.G. Osbourn's Music Saloon, 1835.
- Lanard, Thomas S. Interesting Moments with the State Fencibles of Philadelphia, A Brief Synopsis of Its Organization and Chronology of Its Progress 1813-1937. 1938.
- Lanard, Thomas S. One Hundred Years with the State Fencibles; A History of the First Company State Fencibles, Infantry Corps State Fencibles, Infantry Battalion State Fencibles, and the Old Guard State Fencibles, 1813-1913. Philadelphia: Nields Co, 1913.
- Lanard, Thomas S. Spectemur Agendo A History of the State Fencibles, 1913-1919, Including All of the Principal Events from the Centennial Anniversary to the End of the World War. Camden, N.J.: I.F. Huntzinger Co., printers, 1920. Notes: "Published pursuant to a resolution by the board of officers of the State fencibles infantry regiment."
- The Pennsylvania Troops -- State Fencibles Papers. 1842. Summary: Contains the following types of materials: clippings, newspapers, books / manuals, diary / journal. Contains information pertaining to the following military unit and organization: 1st Company, State Fencibles. General description of the collection: The Pennsylvania State Fencibles papers include book of clippings, newspaper, handwritten notes about State Fencibles.
- Old Guard State Fencibles (Philadelphia, Pa.). State Fencibles Records. 1875. Summary: Scrapbooks (1875-1885, 1891, 1898, 1904-1957) containing clippings chiefly relating to the social activities of the organization; minute books (2 v., 1911-1932, 1947-1961) of monthly meetings; and other papers (1876-1886, 1899, 1908-1942, 1963-1981) including correspondence, photos, and clippings.
- Paddock, Wilbur F. Honey Out of the Rock: A Discourse Delivered in St. Andrew's Church, Philadelphia on the Day of National Thanksgiving, November 26th, 1874, in the Presence of the Infantry Corps of State Fencibles. Philadelphia: Rowley & Chew, printers, 1874.
- Philadelphia (Pa.). Fourth Annual Reception State Fencibles Battalion N.G.P. Monday Evening, February 2, 1891. American Academy of Music. [Philadelphia]: [Geo. S. Harris & Sons], 1891. Description: 80 pages: illustrations; 8vo.
- Philadelphia (Pa.). State Fencibles. 1889. Notes: Printed in double columns. This organization furnished two companies to the 18th Penn. Infantry.
- Ratel, Ph, and George Willig. State Fencible's March & Quick Step. Philadelphia: Printed by G, 1814. Notes: For piano. Caption title. Pages [1] and [4] are blank. At head of music: copy right secured. Description: 1 score (4 unnumbered pages); 35 cm.
- Victor Orchestra. Infantry Corps State Fencibles March. 1903. Description: 1 audio disc: analog, 78 rpm; 7 in.
- Walch, J. The Philadelphia State Fencibles Quickmarch. New York: Hewitt, 1820. Notes: For piano. "As performed by the Boston Band in Philadelphia, respecttully dedicated by them to Capt. J. Page. Caption title. Description: 1 score (2 pages).
