= Audubon, Pennsylvania =

Unincorporated community in Pennsylvania, US

Audubon
- Census-designated place
- Audubon is located north of Valley Forge National Historical Park
- Location of Audubon in Pennsylvania Audubon (the United States)
- Coordinates: 40°07′51″N 75°25′33″W
- Country: United States
- State: Pennsylvania
- County: Montgomery
- Township: Lower Providence

Area
  - Total: 4.60 sq mi (11.92 km^{2})
  - Land: 4.59 sq mi (11.89 km^{2})
  - Water: 0.012 sq mi (0.03 km^{2})
- Elevation: 194 ft (59 m)

Population (2020)
  - Total: 8,688
  - Density: 1,893.0/sq mi (730.91/km^{2})
- Time zone: UTC-5 (EST)
  - Summer (DST): UTC-4 (EDT)
- Postal code: 19403
- Area codes: 610 and 484
- FIPS code: 42-03544

Audubon is a census-designated place (CDP) in Lower Providence Township, Pennsylvania, United States. It was named for naturalist John James Audubon, who lived there as a young man. As of the 2020 census, Audubon had a population of 8,688.

== Geography ==
Audubon is located in the southwest section of Lower Providence Township, opposite Valley Forge National Historic Park, and includes "The Peninsula" formed by the Schuylkill River and Perkiomen Creek. According to the U.S. Census Bureau, the CDP has a total area of 4.5 square miles (12 km^{2}), of which 0.04 square miles (0.10 km^{2}), or 0.44%, is water.

== Demographics ==
Historical population
Census	Pop.	Note	%±
1990	6,328		—
2000	6,549		3.5%
2010	8,433		28.8%
2020	8,688		3.0%

As of the 2010 census, the CDP was 78.1% White, 5.2% Black or African American, 13.4% Asian, 0.7% were Some Other Race, and 1.2% were two or more races. 2.3% of the population were of Hispanic or Latino ancestry.

As of the census of 2000, there were 6,549 people, 2,379 households, and 1,750 families residing in the CDP. The population density was 1,461.1 inhabitants per square mile (564.1/km^{2}). There were 2,457 housing units at an average density of 548.1 per square mile (211.6/km^{2}). The racial makeup of the CDP was 87.86% White, 4.35% African American, 0.05% Native American, 6.03% Asian, 1.28% from other races, and 0.43% from two or more races. Hispanic or Latino of any race were 2.03% of the population.

There were 2,379 households, out of which 35.9% had children under the age of 18 living with them, 63.8% were married couples living together, 7.1% had a female householder with no husband present, and 26.4% were non-families. 20.5% of all households were made up of individuals, and 6.1% had someone living alone who was 65 years of age or older. The average household size was 2.67 and the average family size was 3.14.

In the CDP, the population was spread out, with 28.4% under the age of 18, 5.9% from 18 to 24, 31.8% from 25 to 44, 22.5% from 45 to 64, and 11.3% who were 65 years of age or older. The median age was 36 years. For every 100 females, there were 107.3 males. For every 100 females age 18 and over, there were 99.2 males.

The median income for a household in the CDP was $70,527, and the median income for a family was $80,178. Males had a median income of $51,852 versus $35,965 for females. The per capita income for the CDP was $28,144. About 3.1% of families and 5.1% of the population were below the poverty line, including 5.4% of those under age 18 and 6.5% of those age 65 or over.

== History ==
The villages that have comprised Lower Providence Township since the early eighteenth century include Evansburg, Shannonville (now called Audubon), Eagleville, and Providence Square.

Lower Providence Township is currently bounded on the west by Upper Providence Township, on the northeast by Perkiomen and Worcester townships, on the southeast by West Norriton Township, and on the south by the Schuylkill River. The area of the township is 9,143 acres (37.00 km^{2}). Red shale predominates in the soils of this part of Montgomery County. Many years ago, lead mines were worked near Perkiomen Creek at Oaks, Pennsylvania, but did not generate profits. The mines were opened in 1800 and were being operated in 1818 by a Mr. Wetherell. The discovery of copper followed that of lead, and in January 1848, the Perkiomen Mining Association was formed. Its land cost about $10,000; much costly machinery was placed in position and a shaft was dug. Many thousands of tons of copper were unearthed over the years until deposits were exhausted.

Shannonville was named after a large, influential family in 1823, when a post office was established there. Jack's tavern—the old Bud's Bar—was opened here as well. Mr. Shannon was a prosperous pig farmer and hence the town gained the nickname "Hogtown".

Present-day Audubon was christened in 1899 in honor of early-19th century resident John James Audubon, who resided at Mill Grove, located at the intersection of Audubon and Pawlings Roads.

== Local landmarks ==
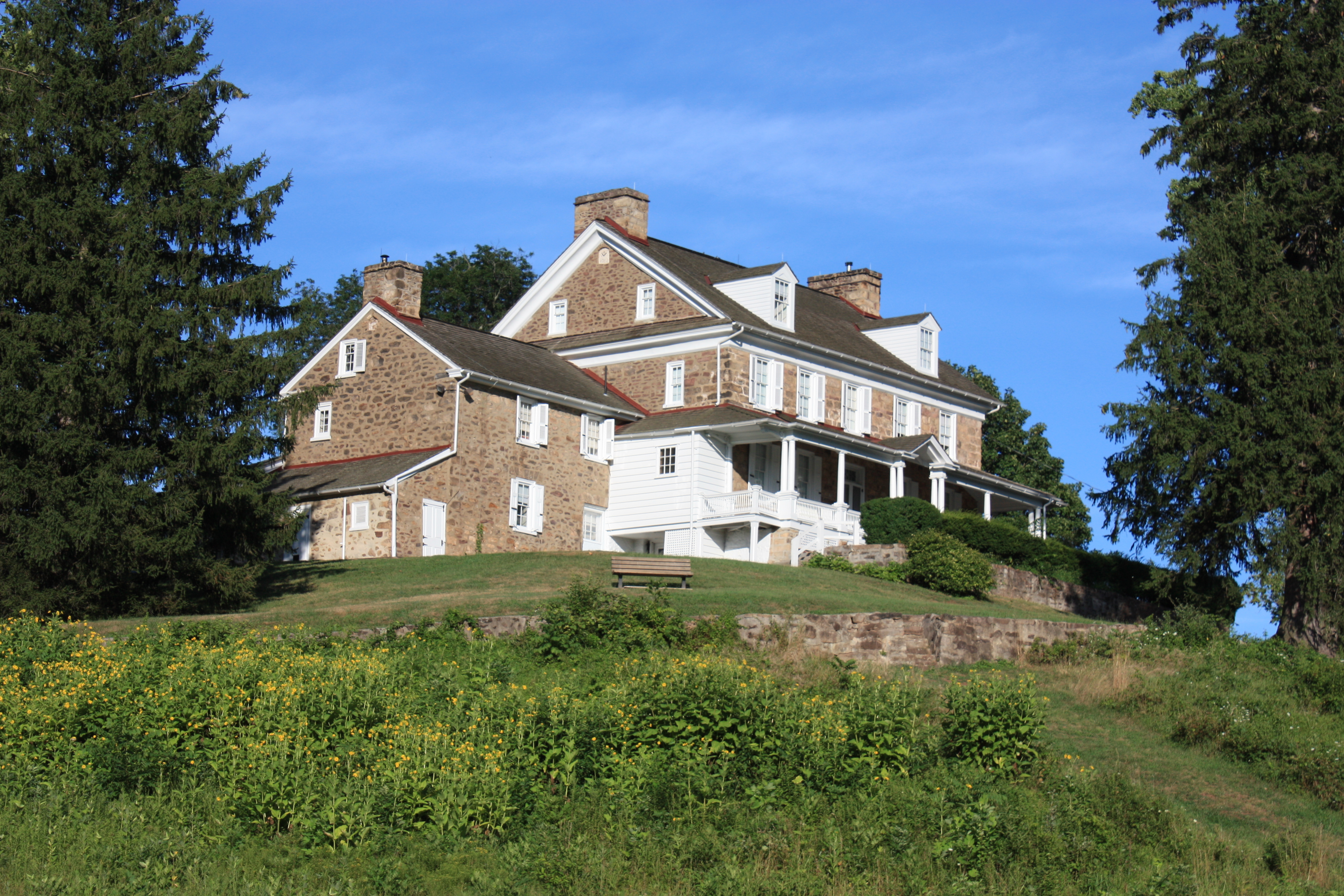
Mill Grove

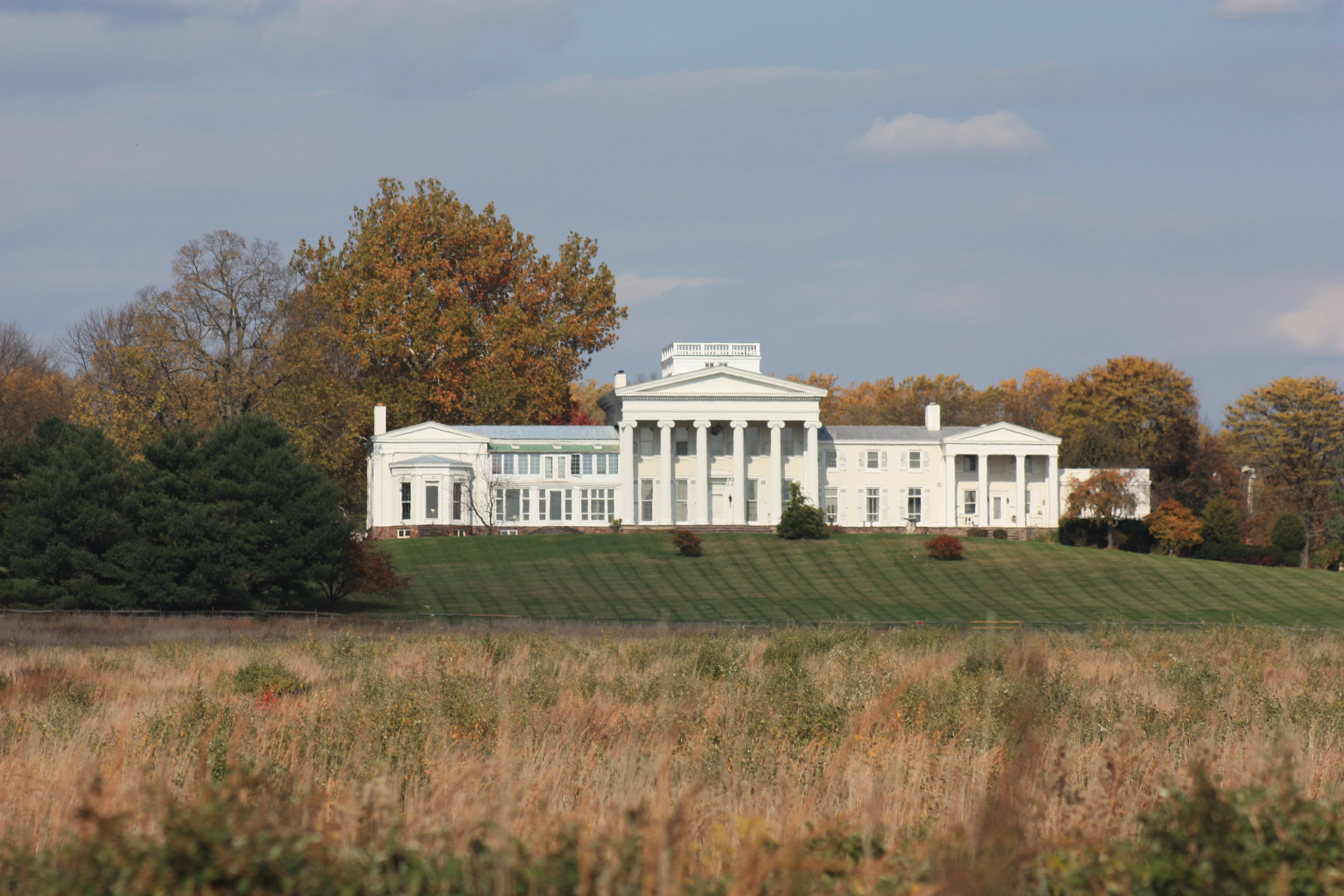
Fatland Hall

Audubon lies on the north side of the Schuylkill River across from Valley Forge National Historical Park, and is situated about 5 miles (8.0 km) away from the King of Prussia Mall, one of the largest malls in the United States. Local landmarks include:

=== Mill Grove ===
Built in 1762 and listed on the National Register of Historic Places, Mill Grove was the first American home of the artist, author and naturalist John James Audubon. Between 1803 and 1806, Mill Grove and its surrounding fields and woodlands first inspired young Audubon's passion for painting and drawing birds. Today, the 175-acre (0.71 km^{2}) estate serves as an educational center of the National Audubon Society, dedicated to connecting people with nature. A haven for birds and wildlife, the property has more than 7 miles (11 km) of trails and views of Perkiomen Creek. The historic three-story stone farmhouse contains a museum displaying original Audubon prints, oil painting, and Audubon memorabilia.

Discouraged by disputes with partners and the failure of the lead mine on the property, Audubon sold Mill Grove. He married Lucy Bakewell Audubon, the daughter of a neighboring landowner, and moved to Kentucky to seek his fortune as a frontier merchant. Mill Grove later became the property of Samuel Wetherill 3rd of Philadelphia, who purchased the property in 1813. It remained in that family for 138 years, when Herbert J. Wetherill sold it in 1951 to Montgomery County. In April 2003 the National Audubon Society and Montgomery County signed an agreement creating the Mill Grove Audubon Center. The center is managed by Audubon Pennsylvania, the state office of the National Audubon Society.

=== Walnut Hill (Pawlings Farm) ===
The land known as the Perkiomen Peninsula, and particularly the Pawling Farm, played an essential role in the Valley Forge winter encampment of 1777–1778. It provided strategic protection for the camp, serving as the site of the newly commissary function, which saved the Continental Army from starvation, and the site of the encampment itself before the Continental Army marched on to victory at Monmouth.

The peninsula is now a mix of habitats—open meadow, riparian and upland forest, wetlands, and extensive vernal ponds. This is why the Pawling Farm lands provide the best wildlife habitat in the entire 3,500-acre (14 km^{2}) park. The park's unpaved River Trail runs from the Pawling Bridge to Betzwood, and is a favorite of local residents. The paved Schuylkill River Trail runs along the northern edge of the Pawling Farm. Located on the south side of Apple Valley Lane is a reconstructed stone wall, commissioned by David Lapps and Eileen Moran), from one of the original structures that some of the troops stayed in during the winter of 1777–1778.

=== Schuylkill River Trail ===
13.5-mile (21.7 km) multiuse trail that runs from Philadelphia to Oaks. It was built on the Pennsylvania Railroad right-of-way and parallels the scenic Schuylkill River as it passes through various townships and boroughs. The trail is a destination for biking, rollerblading, jogging, and walking. It is recognized as a National Recreation Trail by the U.S. Department of Interior's National Trails System. Trailheads include Betzwood Park (parking/restrooms), Pawlings Road (parking), Mill Grove, and the Upper Providence Park (parking/restrooms) off Rt. 422 and Egypt Road in Oaks.

=== Perkiomen Trail ===
The 19-mile (31 km) scenic Perkiomen Trail runs through the Perkiomen Creek Valley from its junction with the Schuylkill River Trail at Oaks, Upper Providence Township, to Green Lane Park, the largest county park. Most of the trail is a 10-foot (3.0 m)-wide cinder or stone aggregate (unpaved) surface with grass shoulders. Selected sections are paved where deemed appropriate. The trail is used by walkers, joggers, bicyclists, cross-country skiers, and equestrians.

The trail, developed on a former railroad bed, follows Perkiomen Creek and connects three county parks (Lower Perkiomen Valley Park, Central Perkiomen Valley Park, and Green Lane Park) and two county historic sites (Mill Grove at Audubon Wildlife Sanctuary and Pennypacker Mills). It passes directly through ten municipalities, making connections to numerous municipal parks and open spaces along the scenic waterway. It provides access to Valley Forge National Historical Park via its connection to the Schuylkill River Trail extension.

=== Audubon Elementary School ===
Located roughly in the center of Audubon, Audubon Elementary school was decommissioned from the late 1980s until the mid-1990s. During that interim period, it housed the town library and a YMCA. In the mid-1990s, it underwent extensive renovation and was reopened to coincide with a large housing boom in the area. On the corner of its property, there is a tree that is at least two centuries old. In 2017, the Methacton School District Board of Education voted to close Audubon Elementary effective July 1, 2017.

=== The Club at Shannondell (formerly General Washington Golf and Swim Club) ===
Leased from Lower Providence Township by Shannondell Retirement Services around the year 2000, this 18-hole championship golf course features 6,122 yards (5,598 m) of golf from the tips for a par of 70. The course rating is 69.9, and it has a slope rating of 121 on ryegrass. General Washington golf course opened in 1965. The facility is currently paid for by the taxpayers of Lower Providence who pay a $417K per year mortgage while the township receives $100K per year and receives no profit share or tax revenue from the lease. The facility also includes a family-oriented swim club and upscale family-dining restaurant. A pool membership in 2019 cost $900 for a family.

=== Audubon Inn ===
This large colonial-era structure is located at the corner of Park Avenue and Egypt Roads, and its proposed demolition was a subject of dispute in a 2005 township rezoning hearing. Currently it houses a law firm, though in the past it has served as a restaurant and inn. The Audubon Inn was bought by a local law firm, and the property behind it bought by CVS.

== Education ==
The Methacton School District serves public school students in Audubon. Portions of the Audubon CDP are served by Woodland Elementary School and Arrowhead Elementary School.

Skyview Upper Elementary School, Arcola Intermediate School, and Methacton High School serve all parts of the district. Skyview Upper and Arcola Intermediate are in Trooper CDP, and Methacton High is near the Eagleville CDP but not in it.
