= Chris Groves =

Chris Groves may refer to:

- Chris Groves of Dealership (band)
- Chris Groves (The Inbetweeners), character in the British sitcom The Inbetweeners, which ran for three seasons from 2008 to 2010
