= Secret American Livingroom =

EP by Dealership
- Released: August 8, 1998
- Recorded: Locomoto Productions
- Genre: Indie pop, indie rock
- Length: 27:45
- Label: Self-released (DLRSHP-01)
- Producer: Dealership

Dealership chronology
Secret American Livingroom (1998)	TV Highway to the Stars (2001)

Professional ratings
Review scores
Source	Rating
babysue	(5/6)
In Music We Trust	(A)
Splendid E-zine	(positive)

Secret American Livingroom is the first album by the indie pop/rock band Dealership. The album was self-released by the band in 1998.

The project began as a two-song single, but it soon expanded into an eight-song EP.

After the album's release, it remained in the KALX Top 35 for eight weeks.

== Track listing ==
All songs written by Dealership.

1. "Jungle Gym" – 3:26
2. "My Box" – 2:41
3. "Nerdy Girl" – 3:00
4. "Fallout" – 2:50
5. "Perfectly Happy" – 4:05
6. "Montserrat" – 2:21
7. "You're Dumb" – 5:01
8. "Green" – 4:21

== Personnel ==
=== Dealership ===
- Chris Groves - vocals, bass guitar
- Miyuki Jane Pinckard - guitar, vocals
- Chris Wetherell - drums, vocals

=== Production ===
Secret American Livingroom was produced by Dealership, recorded and mixed at Locomoto Productions by Guy Higbey. The album was mastered at Olde West by Guy Slater. Album design was by Dealership with photography by Eric Schulz and Liisa Pera.
