= Jason Koxvold =

British artist and director

- Born: 1977 (age 48–49); Liège, Belgium
- Education: University of Edinburgh, Haileybury and Imperial Service College
- Known for: Film, Photography, and Interactive media

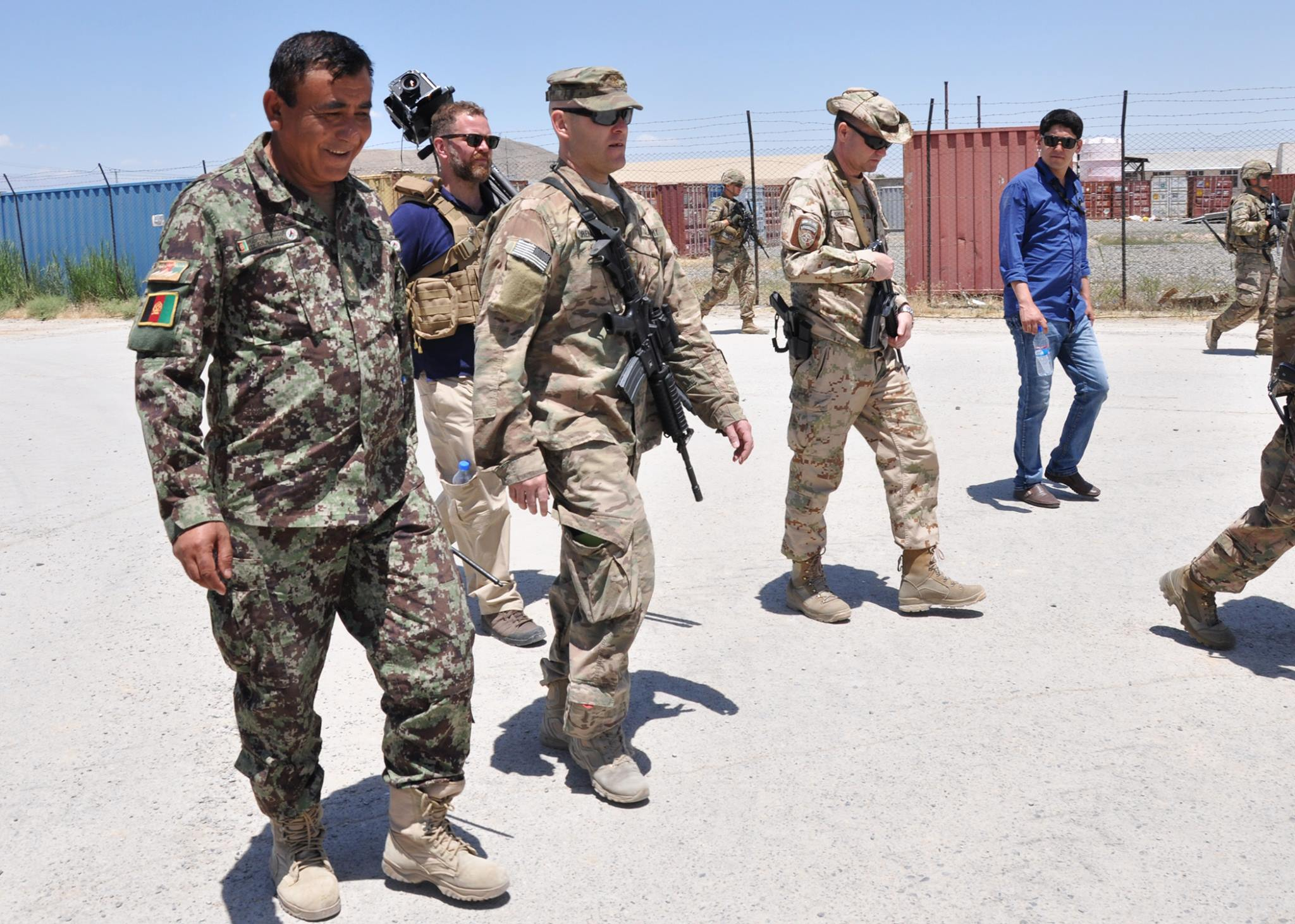
Jason Koxvold in Kabul, 2015

Jason Koxvold (born 1977 in Belgium) is a British artist and director based in New York City in the United States working in photography, interactive media and film. He is also the founder of Gnomic Book, an imprint focused on high-quality artist books. Best known for his stark, graphical large-format photographs depicting the topology of globalisation, he works in 4x5" and 8x10" using Kodak film, with lenses by Schneider Kreuznach and Nikkor. He has worked in Europe, Asia, the Middle East, and the Americas, from China to Kuwait, Afghanistan to South Africa.

== Awards ==
Koxvold has judged the 2007 Emmy Awards, the 2008, 2009, 2010, 2013 & 2014 AICP shows, and the 2009 & 2013 One Show Awards. His short films and music videos have been screened at South by Southwest, the Los Angeles Film Festival, Hawaii International Film Festival, San Francisco Independent Film Festival and the RES (magazine) Los Angeles Screenings. His music video for Citizens Here and Abroad, 'You drive and we'll listen to music,' won Best Short Film at the Queens International Film Festival and Best Short Film in the Rockstar Games UPLOAD05 competition.

== Collaborators ==
Early in his career, Koxvold directed music videos for San Francisco band Citizens Here and Abroad (now separated), Dealership, and Vervein. He has collaborated with multimedia artists Steve Lambert, Noah Kalina, and Adam Marks and participated in PSST! Pass It On. Koxvold was the title designer for the Ewan McGregor-narrated film 'The Doctor, the Tornado, and the Kentucky Kid', directed by Mark Neale.
