= Fatland =

American mansion and estate

Vaux Hill
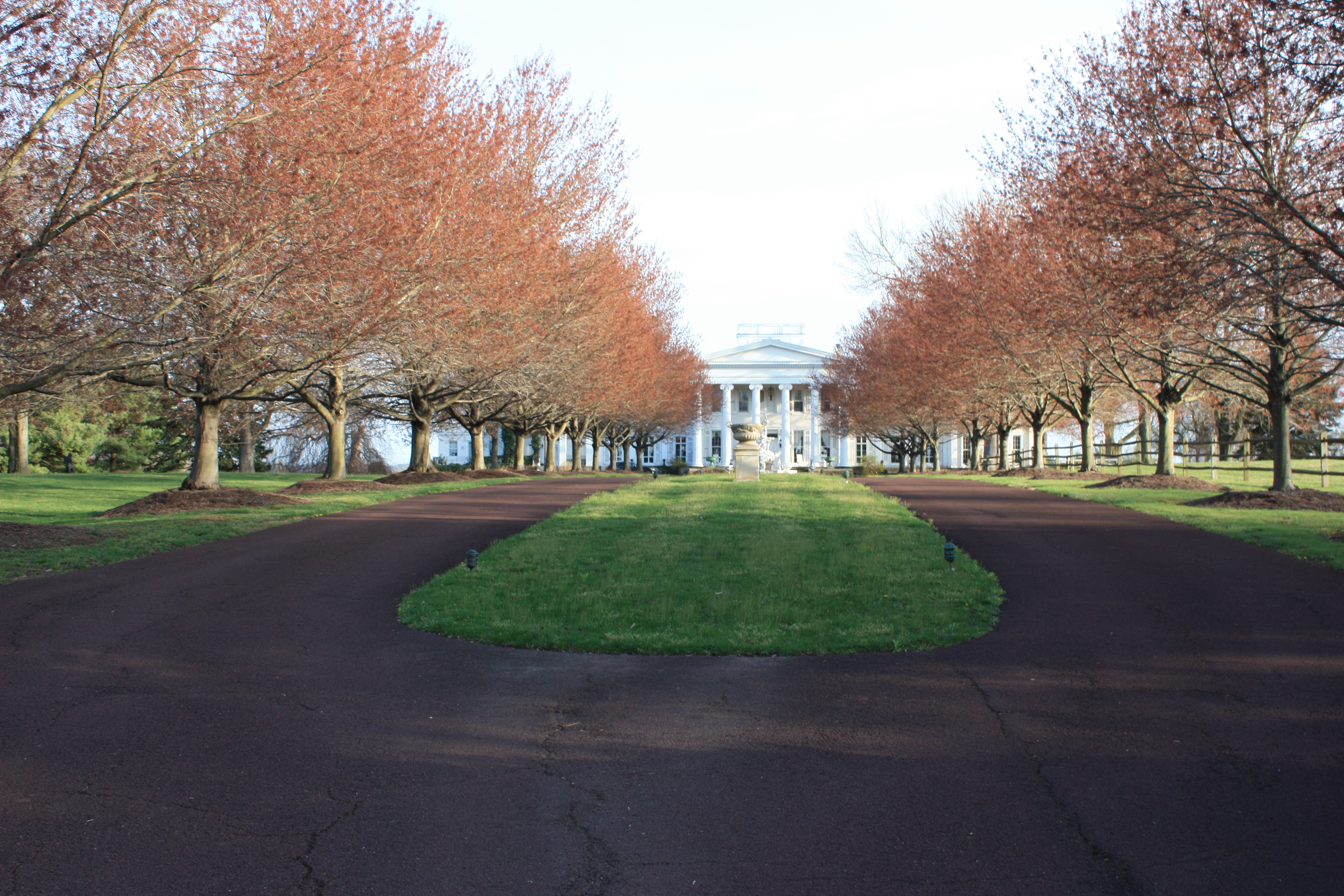
- North facade of Vaux Hill, in 2013

General information
- Architectural style: Greek Revival
- Location: 1248 Pawlings Road, Audubon, Pennsylvania, U.S.
- Coordinates: 40°07′09″N 75°26′35″W
- Construction started: 1843
- Completed: 1845
- Renovated: 1990s

Technical details
- Material: stuccoed brick & stone wooden square columns marble Ionic columns

Design and construction
- Architect: John Haviland

Fatland, also known as Fatland Farm, Vaux Hall, Fatland Ford, and most recently, Vaux Hill, is a Greek Revival mansion and estate in Audubon, Pennsylvania. Located on the north side of the Schuylkill River, opposite Valley Forge, the property was part of the Continental Army's 1777–78 winter encampment. On consecutive days in September 1777, its stone farmhouse served as headquarters for General George Washington and British General Sir William Howe.

The farmhouse was demolished about 1843, and the mansion built on its site was completed about 1845. The Wetherill Family owned the property for 121 years—1825 to 1946. A private cemetery contains the graves of some of Fatland's owners, and of Free Quakers who supported the Revolutionary War.

== Fatland Farm ==
The Perkiomen Creek empties in to the Schuylkill River just north of Valley Forge. The river curves in an oxbow and forms a peninsula with the creek. Early settlers called the area the "Fatlands of Egypt" because of its frequent flooding and rich alluvial soil.

James Morgan dammed the creek and built a grist mill and miller's house on the north side of the Perkiomen Peninsula in 1749. He built the country seat "Mill Grove" in 1762. In a February 28, 1771 advertisement in The Pennsylvania Gazette, he announced the upcoming auction of two adjacent properties, Fatland Farm and Mill Grove Farm:

To be sold at public venue on the 4th day of March, upon the premises, if not sold before at private sale, by the subscriber, in Providence township, Philadelphia county, two valuable plantations, one of which consisting of 300 acres (Fatland farm), bounding near a mile on the Schuylkill river, whereas a good shad fishery; it also bounds the lands of Henry Pawling, Esq., and extends along the same to the Perkiomen; there are about 150 acres cleared, 20 whereof are good watered meadow and a great quantity more may be made; the woodland well timbered and the whole well watered, with the conveniency of watering every field on the plantation; there is a good stone dwelling house, brew house, with a large frame barn, three good bearing apple orchards, with a large peach orchard bearing plentifully. The other contains 250 acres [Mill Grove Farm] ..."

This auction took place, but neither property sold. Instead, James Vaux (1748–1842) purchased Fatland Farm by private sale more than a year later, on June 18, 1772.

== Vaux Hall ==
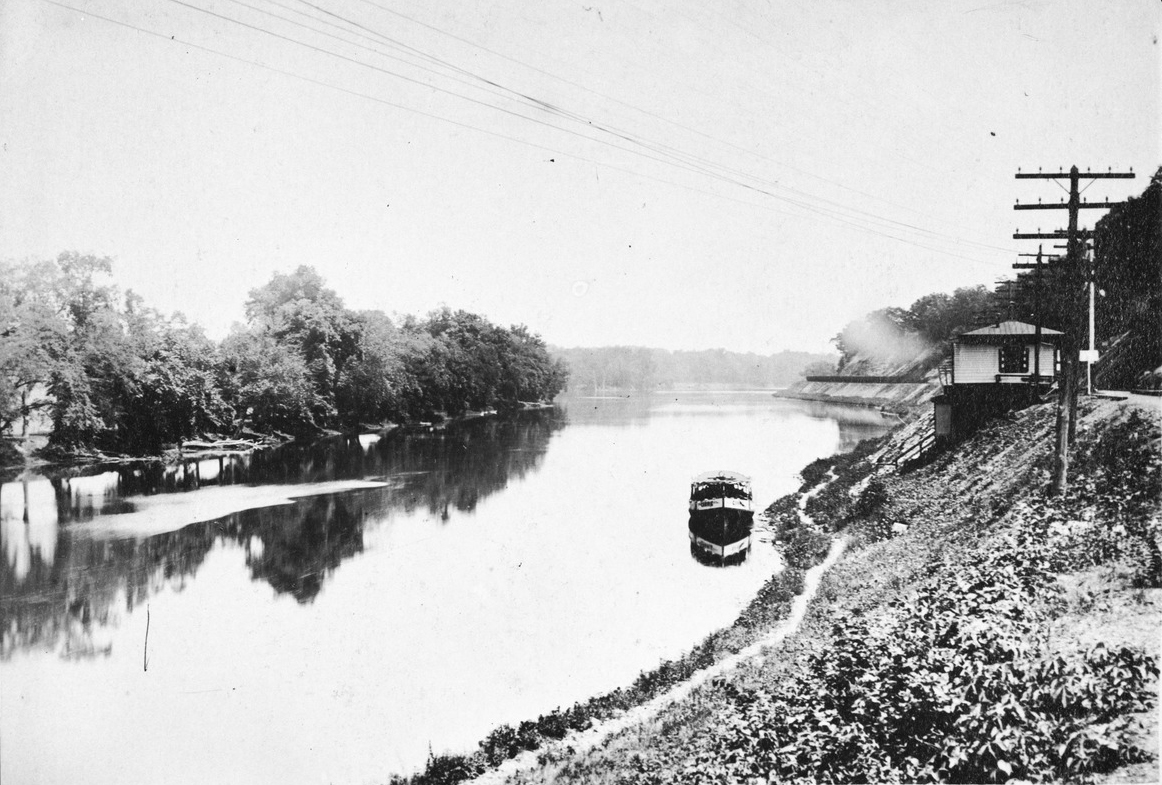
Schuylkill River at Valley Forge, looking east, c. 1910. Fatland Island and Fatland Ford are in the background, center.

Vaux renamed the property "Vaux Hall." The 300-acre (120 ha) farm spanned the middle of the peninsula. Part of its western boundary, shared with Henry Pawling's farm, was the road south to Fatland Ford, a shallow crossing of the Schuylkill River, opposite Valley Forge.

Vaux was an English farmer and Quaker, who emigrated to Pennsylvania in 1771. He expanded the existing stone farmhouse in 1776, and constructed its stone barn. The following year he married Susanna Warder (1749–1812) of Philadelphia, also a Quaker.

Vaux took no side in the Revolutionary War. On September 21, 1777, General George Washington, accompanied by a detachment of his life guard and aide-de-camp Tench Tilghman, surveilled British troops encamped at Valley Forge from the north side of the river. The river was swollen, which prevented the British from crossing. At Washington's direction, his aide urgently wrote to General Alexander McDougall—"... the River has fallen and is fordable at almost any place, the Enemy can have no Reason to delay passing much longer. He would have wrote [sic] you personally, but is employed in viewing the ground and making disposition of the Army which arrived yesterday." Vaux invited Washington to dine and stay the night—the life guard secured Fatland Ford overnight. Washington and his troops departed early the following morning.

That same morning, British Captain John Montroser recorded in his journal: "[September] 22nd. — At 5 this morning ... the Light Infantry and Grenadiers passed over the Schuylkill at Fatland Ford without a single shot and took post." Early that evening, General Howe crossed the ford and made Vaux Hall his headquarters. Vaux dined with Howe, who asked about the rebel officer who had been spotted the previous day. When informed that it had been Washington himself, Howe reportedly replied: "Oh, I wish I had known that. I would have tried to catch him!" The opposing commanders-in-chief probably slept in the same bed on consecutive nights. As Howe slept, the British Army began a night crossing from Valley Forge. Montroser: "[September] 23rd. — Just after 12 o'clock this night the whole army moved to the opposite side, on the north side of the river Schuylkill by the way of Fatland Ford, and by 10 a. m. the whole baggage and all had happily passed it. After the principal body had got on the north side of the Schuylkill about one mile the army halted to dry themselves and rest."

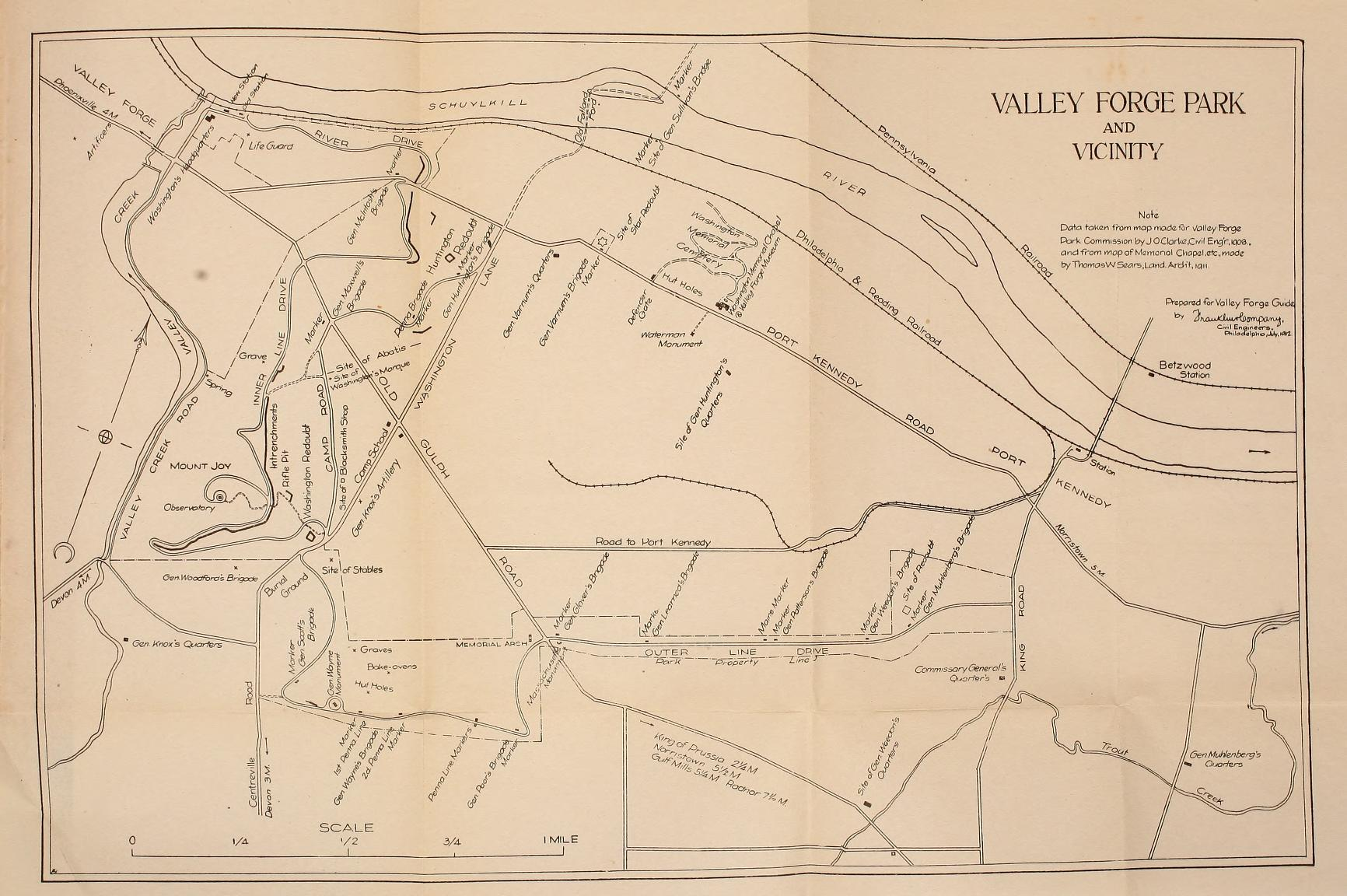
Valley Forge Park and Vicinity (1908). "Old Fatland Ford" is marked at the center top.

General Washington and the Continental Army returned to the area in December 1777, and began the six month Valley Forge encampment. Most of the troops were quartered south of the river, but Vaux's farm was the site of troop encampments and support facilities. General John Sullivan supervised construction of a floating-log bridge slightly downstream from Fatland Ford. This bridge provided a river crossing in times of high water, and an escape route should British attack from the south. The floating bridge was destroyed by ice in 1779.

The British army, in September, 1777, passed from Valley Forge to the left bank of the Schuylkill by the Fatland Ford; not many months later [June 19, 1778], when the American forces evacuated Valley Forge, they crossed at the same place, as just mentioned. Both armies swarmed over the Vaux Hill plantation like devastating clouds of locusts. Tearing down fences, destroying trees and doing thousands of pounds' worth of damage in various ways, they wrought such havoc that Mr. Vaux's estate was seriously embarrassed in consequence.

The Commonwealth of Pennsylvania paid Vaux £1,000 in compensation for damage done to his property during the war. "In the 1785 assessment of Providence township, James Vaux is recorded as a farmer, owning a farm of 300 acres of land, dwelling, four horses, six cows, one servant (colored), and one riding chair." He later served in the Pennsylvania Legislature. Vaux sold Vaux Hall to John Echline Allen, about 1794.

There are no known images of the "good stone dwelling house" described in 1771, or of the house as expanded by Vaux.

== Fatland Ford ==
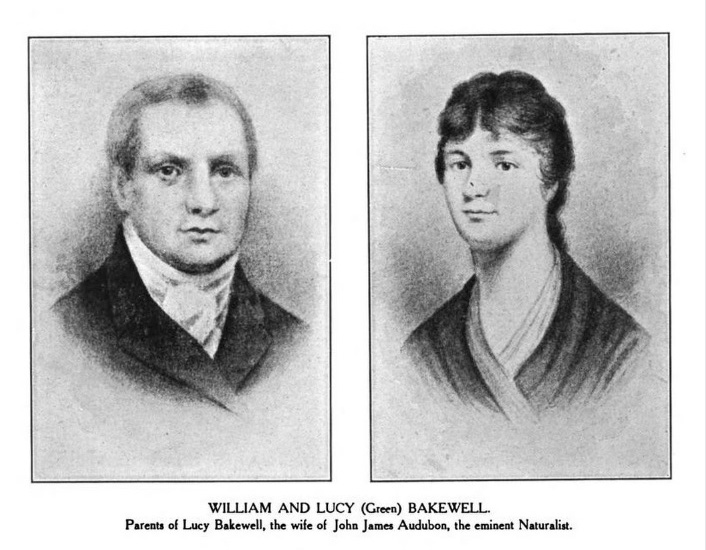
William and Lucy Green Bakewell

By 1803, the farm was owned by James S. Ewing, who advertised it for sale in September. He listed its buildings: "... a dwelling-house 45x35 feet, built of stone, ... Smith's house and Shop, Ice house, spring house, poultry house, smoke house, large stone barn with stables for 40 head of horses and cows ..."

Ewing sold the property to Englishman William Woodhouse Bakewell (1759–1821) who, with his wife, 4 daughters and 2 sons, occupied it in January 1804. Bakewell's wife, Lucy Green Bakewell (1765–1804), died during their first year living there. Their eldest daughter, also named Lucy (1787–1874), took on the duties of hostess.

Bakewell renamed the property "Fatland Ford," and operated it as a gentleman's farm. Robert Sutcliff, a relative of Bakewell's estate manager, visited in August 1804:

This plantation, consists of 300 acres of good land, 200 of which are cleared, and 100 covered with wood. On the estate is a well finished square stone house, about 15 yards [13.7 m] in length, with a wide boarded floor piazza, both in back and front. These afford excellent accommodation during the summer season ... Besides the dwelling house, there is an excellent kitchen, and offices adjoining; with a large barn, and stables sufficient to accommodate 40 horses and cows; all well built of stone. The estate extends the whole breadth betwixt the Schuylkill and Perkiomen. On the former river there is a Shad Fishery which is of considerable value ... This estate, with all its appendages, cost about 3600£ sterling, which is but 12£ per acre, the buildings included. The house is so situated that it commands one of the finest prospects in Pennsylvania, and, being on a rising ground, is dry and healthy. The whole together forms one of the most beautiful spots I have seen in the United States.

=== Audubon ===
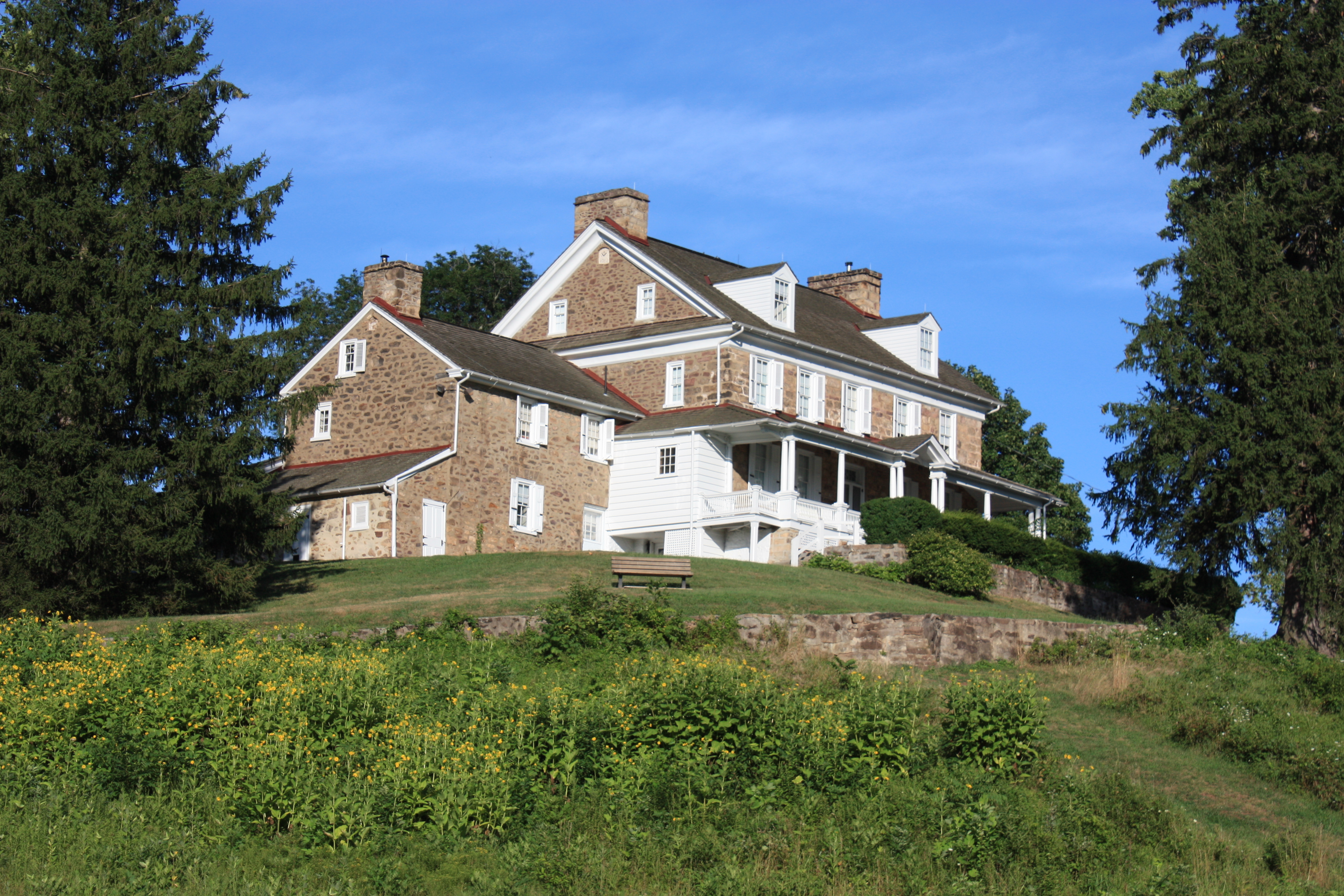
Mill Grove, in 2012.

Sutcliff also visited Mill Grove, then owned by Jean Audubon, a retired French sea captain living in Nantes, France. Lead deposits had been discovered on the farm, and Captain Audubon formed a partnership with French businessman Francis Dacosta to mine the ore. Sutcliff wrote: "In the plantation adjoining to my relation's, we visited a lead mine on the banks of the Perkiomin [sic], which was then worked by a Frenchman. He invited us to go down into it, where, at the depth of about 12 feet, I saw a vein of lead ore 18 inches in thickness; and as it is wrought at a very easy expense, there was a great probability of its being a very valuable acquisition."

The "Frenchman" Sutcliff met may have been Dacosta, or it may have been the captain's 19-year-old son (and future naturalist) John James Audubon—they had arrived in America together the year before. Audubon and 17-year-old Lucy Bakewell fell in love, although her father thought both of them too young to marry. Informed by letter of his son's intentions, Captain Audubon initially opposed the marriage. With money borrowed from the Bakewells, Audubon sailed for France in January 1805 to sort out what to do about Mill Grove and the lead mine, and to obtain his father's permission to marry. He returned to the United States in May 1806 having attained his majority and his father's blessing. Bakewell also consented to the engagement. Audubon sold Mill Grove and his father's interest in the lead mine to Dacosta in September 1806, and moved to New York City to work as a clerk in the counting house of Bakewell's brother. In August 1807, he and a partner opened a pioneer store in Louisville, Kentucky. On April 8, 1808, John James Audubon and Lucy Bakewell were married at "Fatland Ford." The next morning, the newlyweds departed for Louisville, where Audubon continued his short-lived career as a merchant.

When Bakewell advertised Fatland Ford for sale in 1813, he listed "a [steam] threshing-mill, which threshes 12 bushels of barley in an hour," and livestock of "200 Sheep of the English Morena breeds, span of oxen and other cattle, 4 asses, 7 horses, ... 30 pigs of the English Berkshire breed." The sale was not successful; Bakewell was still the owner of the property when he died there in 1821.

Lucy Green Bakewell had been buried at "Fatland Ford" in 1804. Bakewell remarried, and was initially buried in Philadelphia. His descendants later had him reinterred beside his first wife.

== Fatland ==
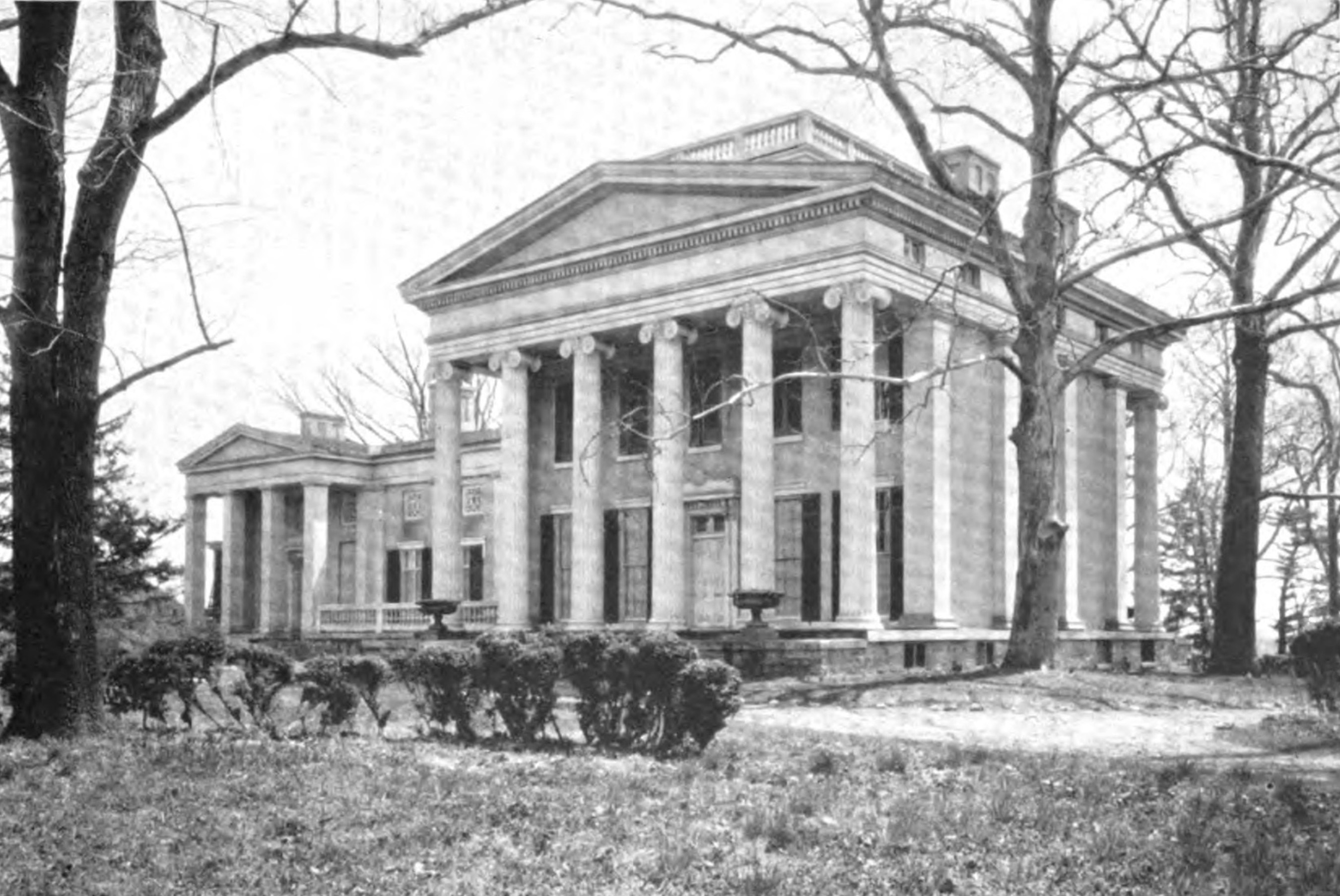
"Fatland," from the northwest, in 1917.

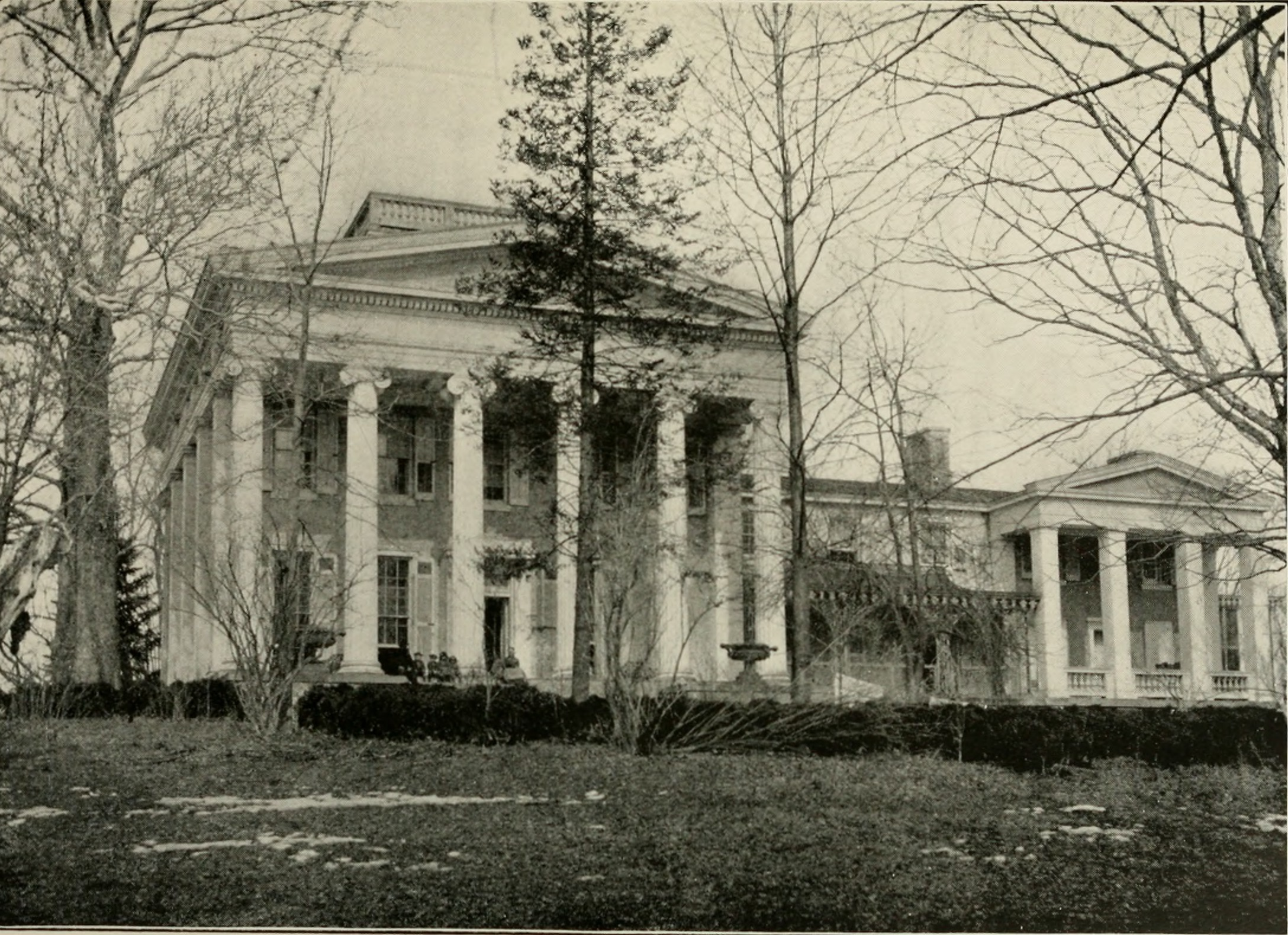
"Fatland," from the south, in the 1890s.

Dacosta's lead mine initially was unprofitable, with costs too great to compete with imported lead from England. The War of 1812 caused imports to be cut off, and the price of lead in the United States to soar. Samuel Wetherill, Jr., a Philadelphia white lead importer and paint manufacturer, purchased Mill Grove for $7,000 in 1813. Wetherill & Son reopened the mine, and "mined and smelted over 100 tons from small veins on Perkiomen Creek in Montgomery County, Pa., on Mill Grove farm." The depleted mine was closed again in the 1820s.

Samuel Wetherill 3rd (1764–1829) purchased "Fatland Ford" in 1825, and changed its name to just "Fatland." He had been his father's partner, and inherited the family business. He and his wife, Rachel Price (1766–1844), had 5 sons and a daughter. Wetherill inherited Mill Grove, bought up farms owned by the Bakewells and the Pawlings, and became the great landowner of the peninsula. He subsequently bequeathed the properties to his children and grandchildren. "These properties were improved with stately mansions and outbuildings with beautiful lawns and surroundings. (Also erected were summer residences on some of the properties.)"

Dr. William Wetherill (1804–1872), inherited Fatland. He was a Philadelphia physician, and partner – with his brother John, who inherited Mill Grove – in the Wetherill White Lead Works. He and his wife Isabella Macomb (1807–1871) had 16 children, 12 of whom lived to adulthood. Dr. Wetherill demolished Fatland's stone farmhouse, about 1843, and replaced it with a Greek Revival mansion built upon the farmhouse's foundations.

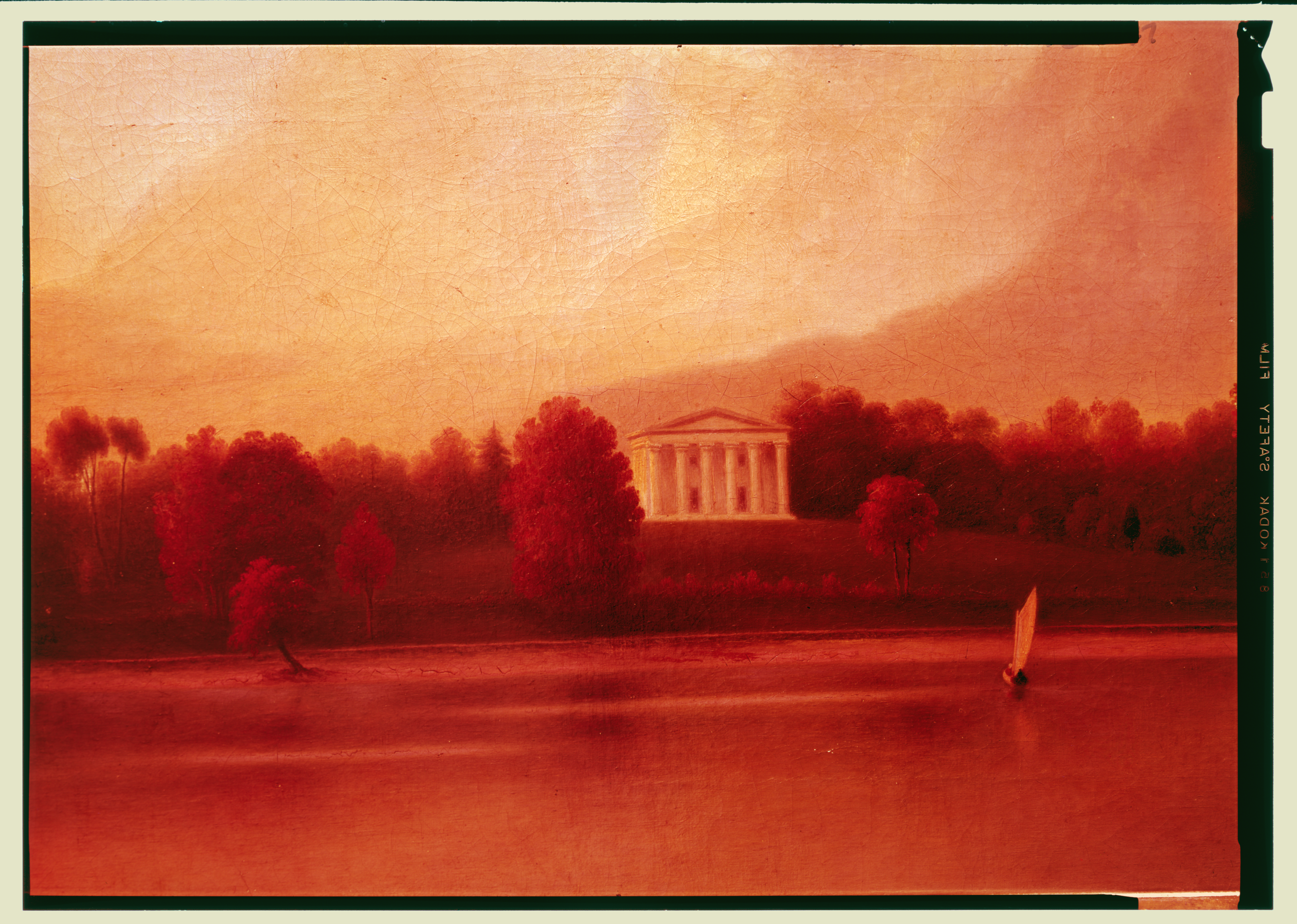
Andalusia on the Delaware River in a c.1800 painting

Possibly inspired by "Andalusia" (1834–36), Nicholas Biddle's great Greek Revival mansion on the Delaware River, designed by architect Benjamin Latrobe; "Fatland Hall" was designed by architect John Haviland for Dr. Wetherill, overlooking the Schuylkill River. The size and arrangement of the mansion's center hall and formal rooms were similar to James Vaux's expanded farmhouse, but with much higher ceilings: "Fatland is special for the scale of the portico and its juxtaposed miniature service wing." The overall composition was asymmetrical, the first floor of the single wing (to the east) consisted of the formal dining room, and pantries and the family dining room in the end pavilion. The kitchen was in the basement below, and servant rooms were above. The end pavilion featured painted-wood-columned porticoes on the front and rear facades. The great Ionic columns of the main block's porticoes were of white marble. The mansion was completed about 1845. A stone tablet in its south gable reads: "J. Vaux, 1776; rebuilt by William Wetherill, 1843." "Bayard Taylor, the historian and traveler, claimed [the view from Fatland's piazza] was the most beautiful view along the beautiful Schuylkill river."

Fatland was inherited by Dr. Wetherill's son, Col. John Macomb Wetherill (1828–1895), a Civil War veteran who managed the family's Pennsylvania coal lands, and never married. He gave permission for William Bakewell's remains to be reinterred beside the first Mrs. Bakewell's remains at Fatland, and Col. Wetherill directed that he himself be buried there. In his will, he deeded the private cemetery to a trust, directed that it be expanded and improved, and established an endowment for its maintenance.

Ownership of Fatland passed to the colonel's younger brother, William H. Wetherill, Jr. (1838–1927) and wife Elizabeth Proctor (1842–1914), under whom the property was "greatly beautified." He carried out the improvements to the private cemetery, and had Wetherill ancestors and others reinterred there.

Dr. Henry Emerson Wetherill (1871–1946), the eldest son of William H. and a U.S. Army surgeon and inventor, inherited Fatland in 1927. He had been a member of Robert Peary's 1893-94 Greenland expedition, on which he collected plant specimens. He also delivered Mrs. Peary's daughter Marie, whom the popular press dubbed the "Snow Baby." An inveterate tinkerer, his diagnostic medical devices were awarded the 1906 Longstreth Medal by the Franklin Institute. He also invented navigational instruments for ships, and a musical instrument called a trombone flute. Dr. Wetherill never married, and was buried in the private cemetery. He was the last Wetherill to own Fatland.

=== Free Quaker - Wetherill Cemetery ===
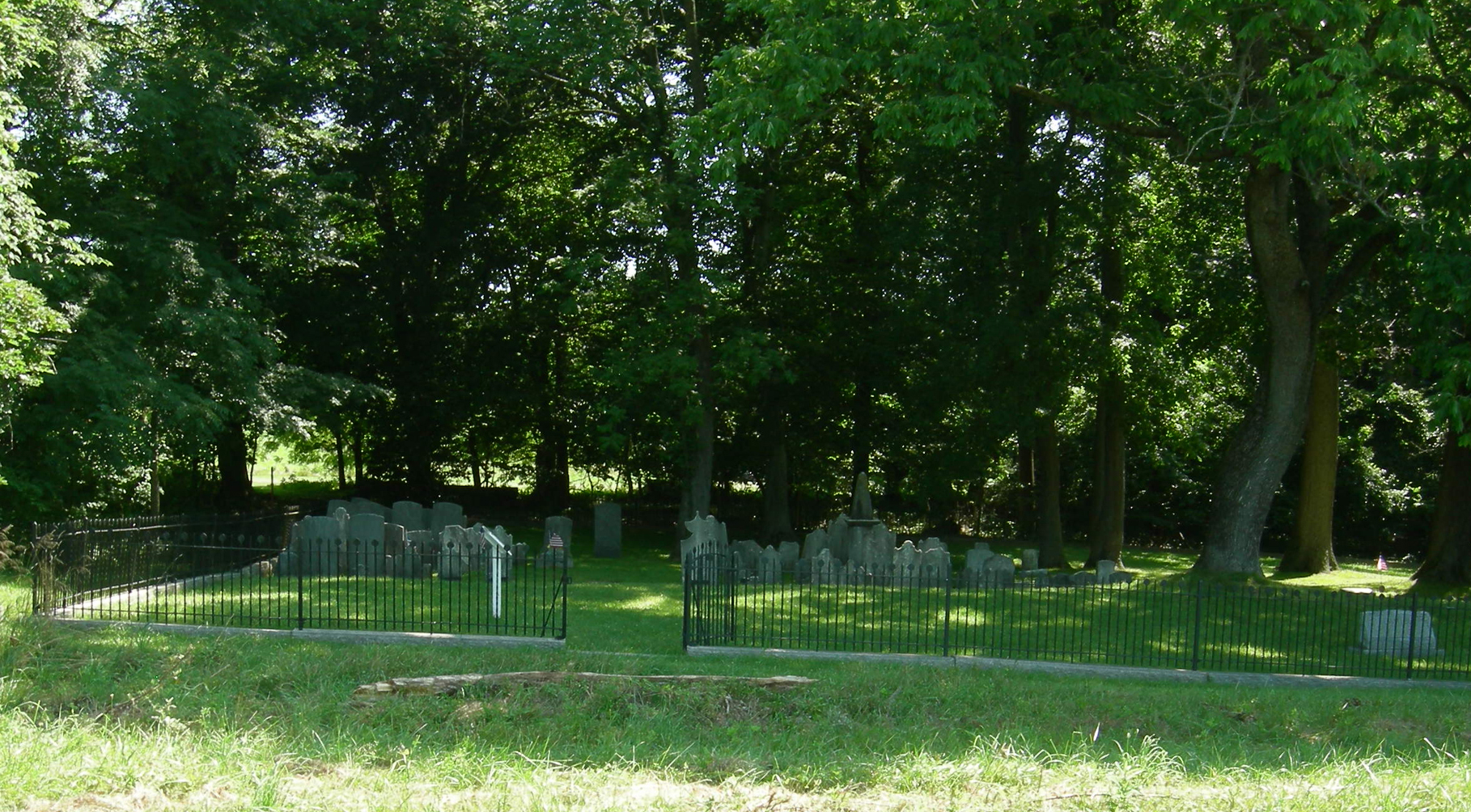
Free Quaker - Wetherill Cemetery, in 2017

Samuel Wetherill, Jr. provided supplies to the Continental Army at Valley Forge, and was "read out of meeting" (disowned) by the Society of Friends in 1779, after refusing to renounce those actions. Defying the pacifism of their religion, "Free Quakers" supported or fought in the Revolutionary War. Wetherill became a founder of Philadelphia's Free Quaker Meeting (chartered February 20, 1781), and served as its clerk and preacher. With brother-in-law Timothy Matlack, another charter member, he designed its meeting house (1783–84), at 5th and Arch Streets. The meeting established its own burying ground, on the east side of 5th Street between Locust and Spruce Streets. Membership dwindled as the Free Quakers died off, and their meeting house was closed in 1836. As the turn of the 20th century approached, the Free Quaker Burying Ground plot became attractive for commercial development. It was in anticipation of the burying ground's sale that Col. John Macomb Wetherill (Samuel Wetherill, Jr.'s great-grandson) directed in his 1895 will that the private cemetery at Fatland be expanded.

In 1905, remains from sixty-one graves were removed from the Free Quaker Burying Ground and reinterred at Fatland. Included were those of Samuel Wetherill, Jr. and his wife and relatives, including Timothy Matlack, scribe of the Second Continental Congress—whose penmanship can be seen in the Declaration of Independence. Many of the tombstones had severely eroded, and were illegible or identifiable only by initials. The remains of Ira Allen, one of Vermont's Green Mountain Boys, had been lost with the closing of another Philadelphia cemetery, and his cenotaph also was moved to Fatland.

Numerous Wetherill family members have been and continue to be buried in the private cemetery.

=== Saint Gabriel's Hall ===
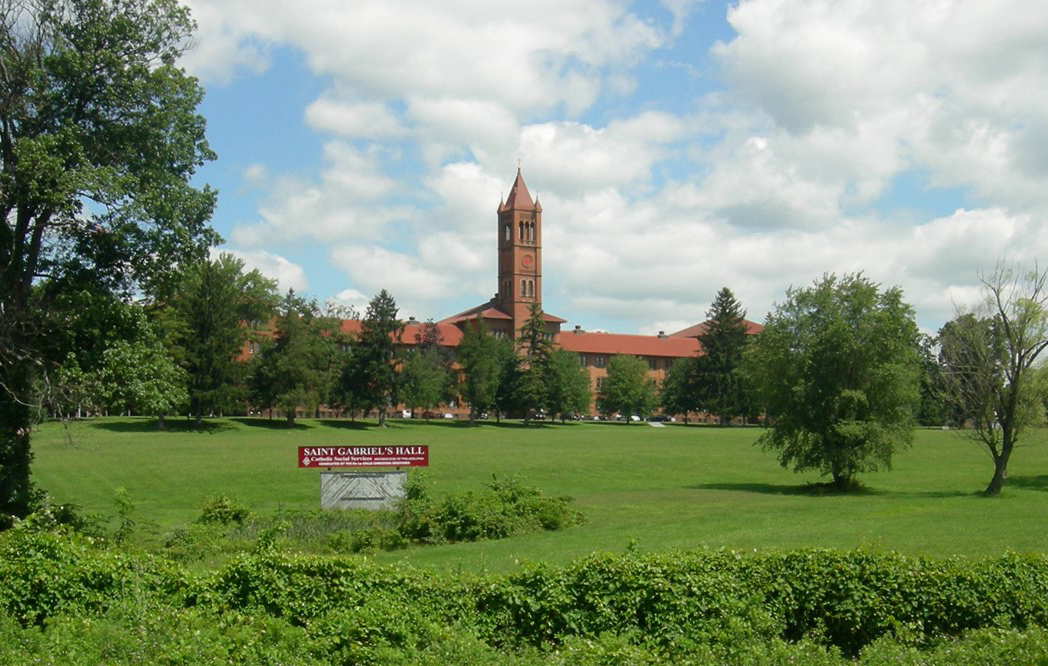
Saint Gabriel's Hall from the Pottstown Expressway, in 2017.

On November 19, 1895, the Roman Catholic Archdiocese of Philadelphia purchased a 185-acre tract of land adjacent to Fatland, to the west. Formerly part of Henry Pawling's farm, there the Archdiocese built the Philadelphia Protectory for Boys, an orphanage staffed by the Christian Brothers. Architects Wilson Brothers & Company designed its Italianate orange-brick-and-red-tile-roofed building, which included a tall campanile, or belltower. Archbishop Patrick John Ryan dedicated the building on May 8, 1898, with more than 3,000 in attendance. Its initial capacity was for housing 200 boys, but the capacity increased to 500 boys with additions that opened in September 1905. An additional 100 acres were purchased in 1902, which extended the property to the Schuylkill River and included Fatland Island (part of Fatland Ford). The name of the Reading Railroad passenger station opposite the west end of the peninsula was changed to Protectory Station, by 1898. The protectory was renamed Saint Gabriel's Hall in 1962.

Operated by the Catholic Social Services of the Archdiocese of Philadelphia, "St. Gabe's" is now a juvenile detention facility. Its border with Fatland follows the old path of Fatland Ford Road.

=== Camiel ===
U.S. Rte. 422 / Pottstown Expressway (bottom right to top center) makes two major curves between crossing the Schuylkill River and Perkiomen Creek.

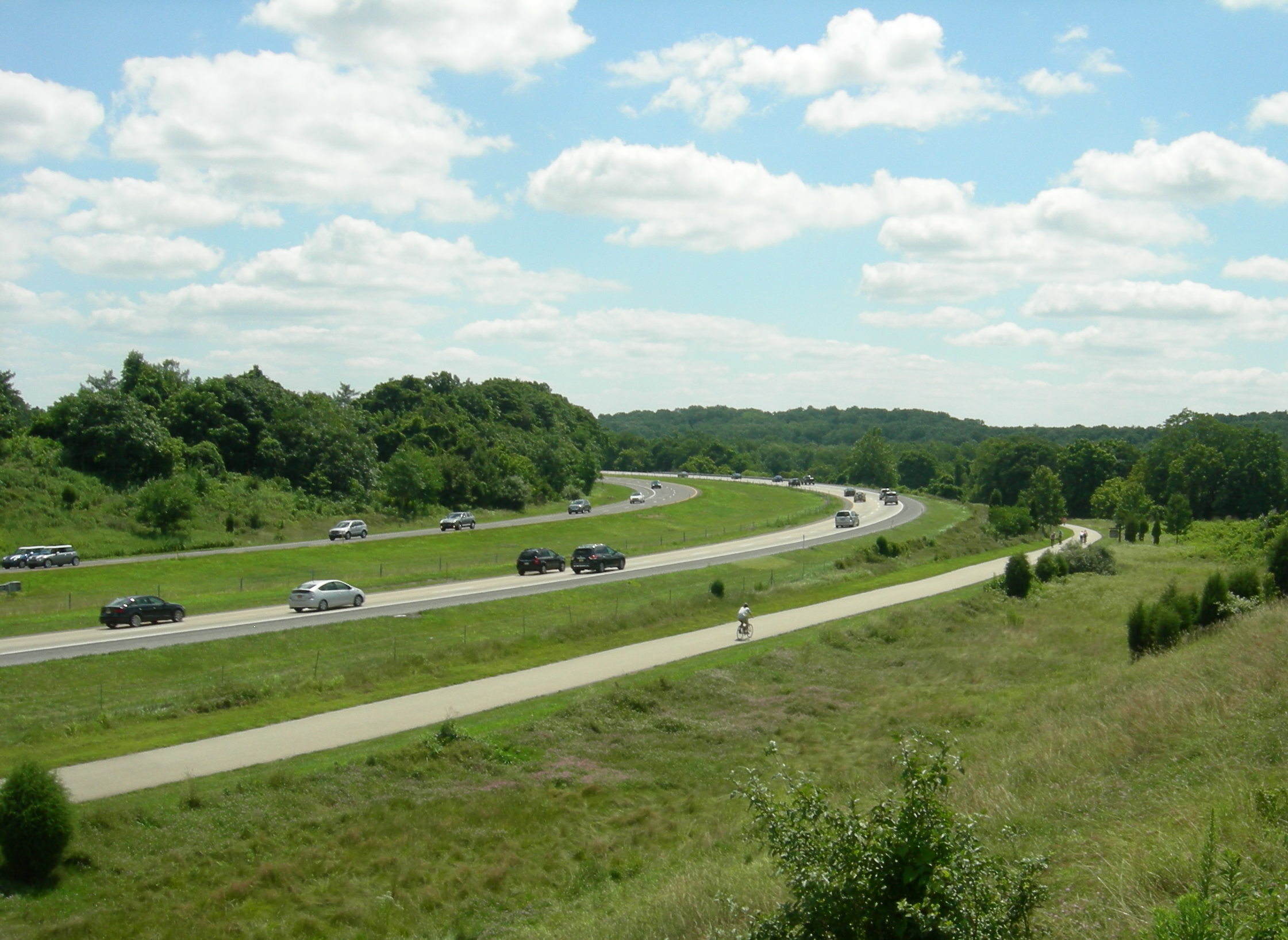
"St. Gabe's Curve." U.S. Rte. 422 / Pottstown Expressway, from Pawlings Road, in 2017.

Antiquarian Harold Donaldson Eberlein wrote about Fatland in 1912. By the time he revisited the estate in 1939, the landscape had changed: "So closely is the house screened by great ancient trees that only in winter can you catch a glimpse from a distance of its stately white porticoes gleaming through the interlacing branches." Dr. Henry Emerson Wetherill died at Fatland in 1946. Later that year the property was purchased by the Philadelphia Democratic politician Peter J. Camiel (1910–1991) and his wife Nina (1913–2007).

Camiel was one of 12 children of Polish Jewish immigrants, and a former boxer, longshoreman and union organizer. He made himself a millionaire as a wholesale beer distributor. Camiel served as a Pennsylvania State Senator from 1953 to 1964, and as chairman of the Philadelphia Democratic City Committee from 1970 to 1976. He was appointed one of five commissioners to the powerful Pennsylvania Turnpike Commission in 1975, serving on it until his death. (Note: Technically, Camiel was suspended from the Turnpike Commission in May 1980, after federal charges were filed against him for corruption. He was found guilty – United States v. Camiel, 689 F.2d 31 (3d Cir. 1982) – but the verdict was reversed on appeal. He returned to the commission in 1983.)

State Senator Vince Fumo: "Pete was a pilot. I used to listen for hours in amazement, when he would tell the stories about how he found Fatland Farm, flying over it in a plane, hidden behind so many trees. He bought it and pulled all those trees out and made it into a showcase right next to Valley Forge Park." The Camiels spent several years renovating the mansion, rehabilitating the overgrown estate, and returning it to being a working farm. About 1950, they sold off a section along the south side of Pawlings Road, between the mansion and Saint Gabriel's Hall, for a housing development.

==== Pottstown Expressway ====
In 1951, following 138 years of family ownership, Herbert Johnson Wetherill sold Mill Grove to Montgomery County to create a bird sanctuary and house museum honoring John James Audubon. Twenty-five years later, it was announced that the planned route for the Pottstown Expressway was to go through the Audubon property. Camiel was credited with / blamed for applying political pressure to reroute the superhighway around the bird sanctuary:

Central to the arguments concerning politicians appears to be the controversial "Camiel Loop." [Montgomery County Planning Commission associate director] Plutte said that the cost of rerouting the Pottstown Expressway around the home of Peter J. Camiel caused the price of the highway to jump from $5 million to $8 million, and most recently to more than $10 million in the past six months. As the highway leaves the connection with Betzwood Bridge and aims northwest toward Pottstown, it veers sharply south [sic west], down and around Camiel's farm, "Fatland." The parabolic dip in the road mean several miles of additional roadway, roadway that Pottstown was denied. Plutte said the Camiel loop was installed to avert a "potential challenge" arising out of an environmental study. Camiel's farm is near the Audubon Sanctuary, which according to original plans, would have had to surrender land to the highway crews. Federal funds, which pay for 70 percent of the Pottstown Expressway, could be jeopardized by the taking of the park land, Plutte said.

Whether Camiel acted from selfish or selfless motives (or a combination of both), the rerouting of the Pottstown Expressway spared Mill Grove – now a National Historic Landmark – and minimized the adverse effect on Fatland. The Camiels owned the property for 44 years, and were buried together in its private cemetery.

== Vaux Hill ==
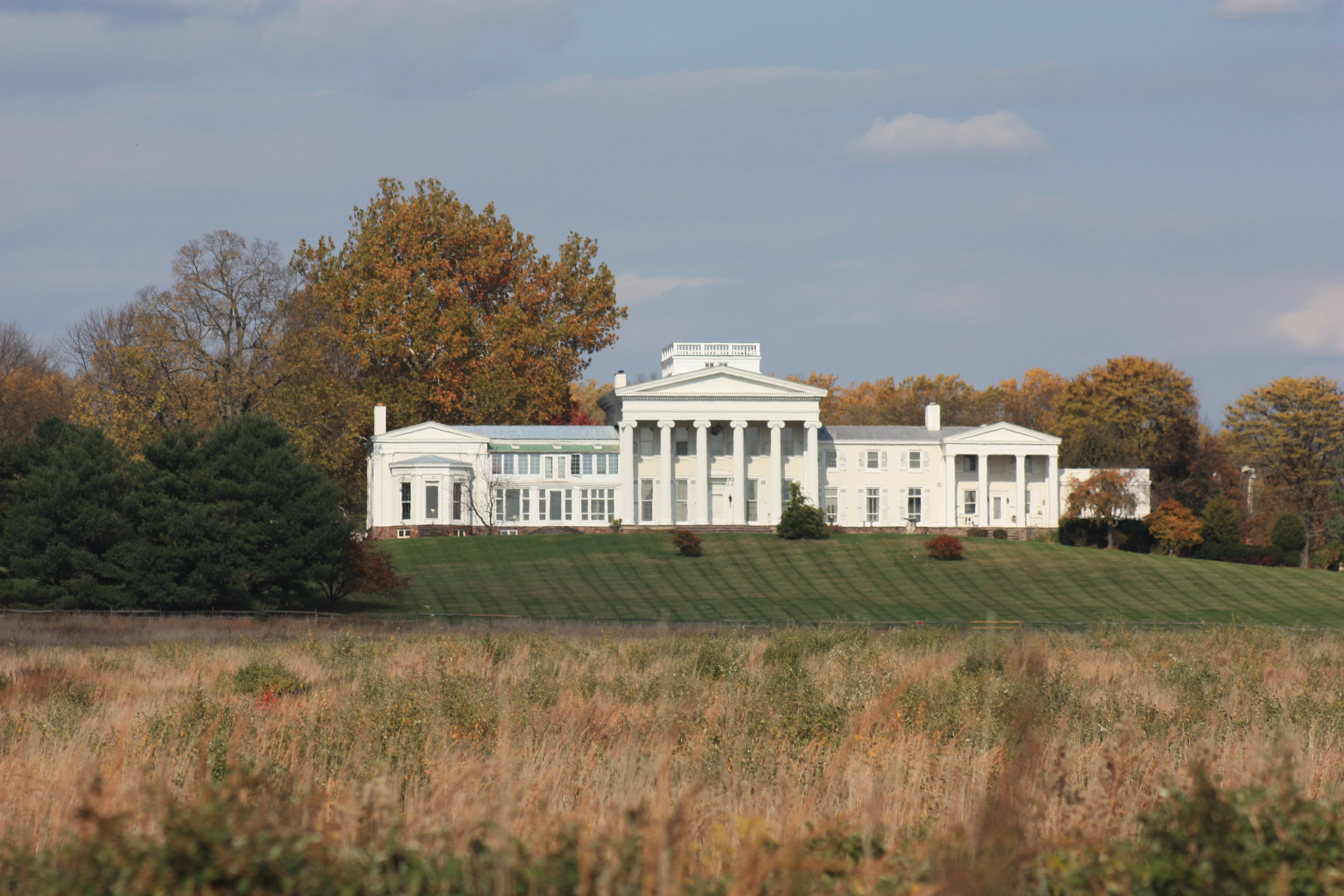
The Staffords added a west wing to the mansion (left), and renamed it "Vaux Hill."

Camiel's land sales dramatically reduced Fatland's acreage—his housing development, land for the Pottstown Expressway, and his 1979 sale of 154 acres (62.3 hectare) between the expressway and the Schyulkill River to Valley Forge National Historical Park. On July 16, 1990, Robert Owen Safford (1934–2011) and his wife Barbara Harvey (b. 1947) purchased the mansion on 18 acres from Camiel for $2.1 million. The couple changed the name of the property to "Vaux Hill," one letter away from the name James Vaux had given it in 1772.

The Saffords expanded the mansion, erecting a west wing and end pavilion that mirrored the east wing and end pavilion—thus creating an overall symmetrical building (for the first time). They remodeled the mansion's interior, and filled it with sumptuous European furniture and decorative arts.

External videos
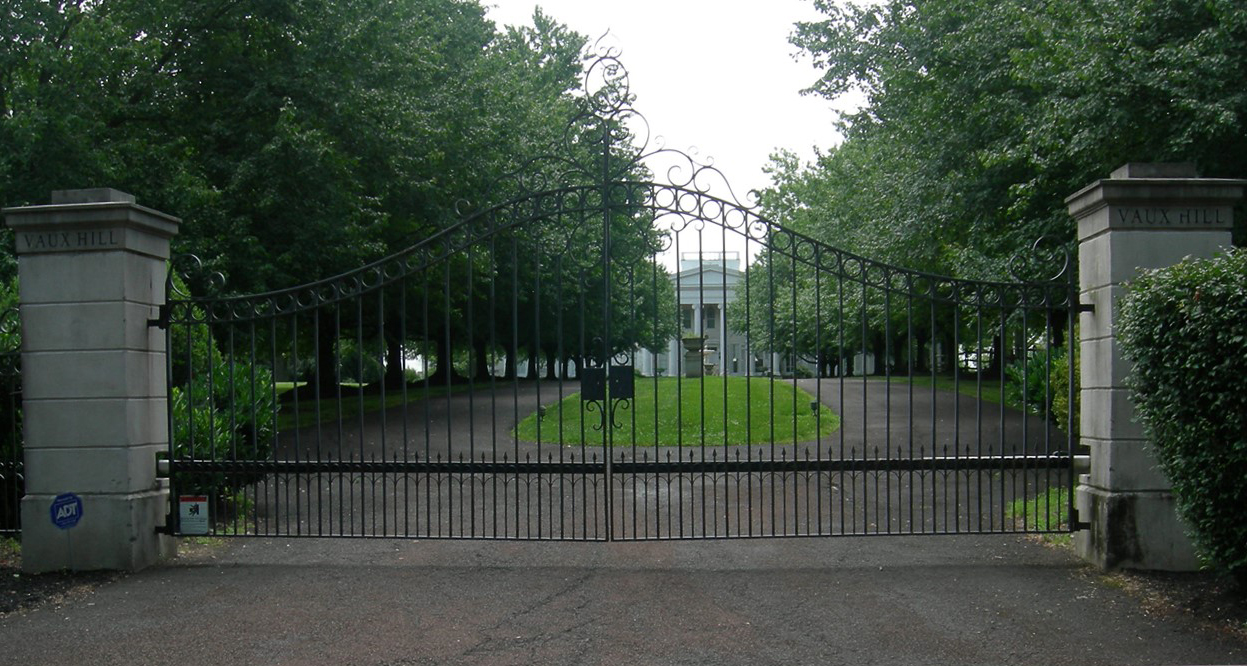
- Selected Contents of Vaux Hill
- Vaux Hill

Following Safford's 2011 death, his widow sold the decorative arts at Freeman's Auction House in Philadelphia. (Note: The September 25, 2013 auction "brought $3.9 million, more than three times the presale estimate." Its top lot was a hand-painted Russian urn from Czar Nicholas I's imperial porcelain factory at St. Petersburg. Estimated at $150,000 to $200,000, it sold for $494,500.)

In 2014, Mrs. Safford put the estate up for sale with an asking price of $9 million for the 8,900-square-foot mansion on 15 acres, with the barn on 3 acres available for a separate sale. In February 2016, the asking price was reduced to $7 million. The current property was sold for $2.74 million on May 28, 2021.
