= Weatherall =

Weatherall or Weatherill is a surname, and may refer to:

== Weatherall ==
- Andrew Weatherall (1963–2020), English musician, DJ, songwriter, producer and remixer
- Ann Weatherall (born 1964), New Zealand psychologist
- David Weatherall (1933–2018), British physician and researcher
- James Weatherall (1936–2018), Royal Navy admiral
- James Owen Weatherall, American physicist, mathematician, and philosopher
- Jim Weatherall (1929–1992), American football player
- Kimberlee Weatherall (born 1974), Australian intellectual property lawyer
- Maddison Weatherall (born 2001), New Zealand rugby player
- Miles Weatherall (1920–2007), British pharmacologist
- Percy Weatherall (born 1957), British businessman
- Raphael Weatherall (born 2004), English cricketer
- Thomas Weatherall (born 2000), Australian actor and playwright

== Weatherill ==
- Bernard Weatherill (1920–2007), British Conservative politician, Speaker of the House of Commons between 1983 and 1992
- Bob Weatherill (1897–1992), Australian football player
- George Weatherill (politician) (1936–2021), Australian politician, deputy leader of the South Australian Labor Party
- George Weatherill (footballer) (1900–1986), Australian football player
- Harry Weatherill (1893–1960), Australian rules footballer
- Jay Weatherill (born 1964), Australian politician, Premier of South Australia (2011–2018)
- Lawrence Weatherill (1905–1984), English athlete
- Nigel Weatherill, former Vice-Chancellor and Chief Executive of Liverpool John Moores University (2011–2018)
- Stephen Weatherill (born 1961), British professor of law

== See also ==
- Wetheral, Cumbria, England
- Wetherall
