= Citizens Here and Abroad =

California rock band

- Origin: San Francisco, California, United States
- Genres: Indie rock
- Years active: 2002 – present
- Labels: Omnibus; Turn Records
- Members: Adrienne Robillard; Dan Lowrie; Chris Groves; Chris Wetherell
- Website: http://www.citizenshereandabroad.com/

Citizens Here and Abroad is an indie rock group from San Francisco, California, United States, that formed in 2002.

== Band history ==
Citizens Here and Abroad was formed in 2002 when Adrienne Robillard and Dan Lowrie, following the breakup of their previous band Secadora, happened to move into an apartment across the street from Dealership drummer Chris Wetherell. Neighborly talking led to musical collaboration. Taking their name from a 1953 Girl Scout manual discovered on a bookshelf at a boozy Oakland house party, the trio cemented their lineup with Dealership bass player/vocalist Chris Groves.

Their sound has been described as dreamy and cerebral. While their songs are built on catchy melodies, they don't tend to follow traditional verse-chorus-verse song structure, opting for a more experimental approach to composition.

In 2004, their debut album, Ghosts of Tables and Chairs was released on Omnibus Records. The band toured the US and the UK in support of the album, and the track Appearances ended up being used in the U.S. television teen soap opera, The O.C.

Their follow-up album, Waving, Not Drowning (see Not Waving but Drowning) was released in 2006 on Turn Records.

== Band members ==
- 2002 to present – Chris Groves; vocals, bass, keyboards
- 2002 to present – Dan Lowrie; guitar
- 2002 to present – Adrienne Robillard; vocals, guitar
- 2002 to present – Chris Wetherell; drums

== Discography ==
Albums

- Ghosts of Tables and Chairs (Omnibus, 2004)
- Waving, Not Drowning (Turn Records, 2006)

Compilations

- Birds of a Feather (2004)
- Orange (Dreams by Degrees 2006)
- Silver Rocket 100 (Silver Rocket, 2007)
