= Stephen Weatherill =

British professor of law

- Born: Stephen Robson Weatherill; 21 March 1961 (age 65); Bishop Auckland, County Durham

Academic work
- Discipline: law
- Sub-discipline: European law
- Institutions: University of Reading 1987–1990; University of Manchester 1990–1997; University of Nottingham from 1995; University of Oxford from 1998

Stephen Robson Weatherill (born 21 March 1961) is a British professor of law and fellow of Somerville College, Oxford. He is emeritus Jacques Delors professor of European law at Oxford University, a post he held from 1998 to 2021. He had previously taught at the University of Reading from 1987 to 1990, at the University of Manchester from 1990 to 1997, and at the University of Nottingham, where from 1995 he was the Jean Monnet professor of European law.

He is an arbitrator for the European Handball Court of Arbitration.
