= Joe Wetherell =

English footballer

Personal information
- Full name: Joseph Wetherell
- Date of birth: 1880
- Place of birth: Oswaldtwistle, Lancashire, England
- Date of death: Unknown
- Position: Goalkeeper

Senior career*
Years	Team	Apps	(Gls)
1896–1897	Newton Heath	2	(0)
- * Club domestic league appearances and goals

Joseph Wetherell (1880 (Note: Date of birth also given in reliable sources as Q4 1872, but predominantly given as 1880.) – ?) was an English footballer who played as a goalkeeper. Born in Oswaldtwistle, Lancashire, he played in The Football League for Manchester United during the 1896–97 season. He signed for the club in June 1896 and played for the reserve team until first-team goalkeeper Joe Ridgway suffered an injury in September 1896. Wetherell made his debut on 21 September in a 3–2 away win over Walsall. The signing of Frank Barrett from Dundee shortly after meant Wetherell sat out the next two games, but he played once more against Small Heath on 10 October. However, he was blamed for conceding Small Heath's only goal in the 1–1 draw and he never played first-team football for Newton Heath again. He was released at the end of the season.
