= Lucy Bakewell Audubon =

British educator and philanthropist

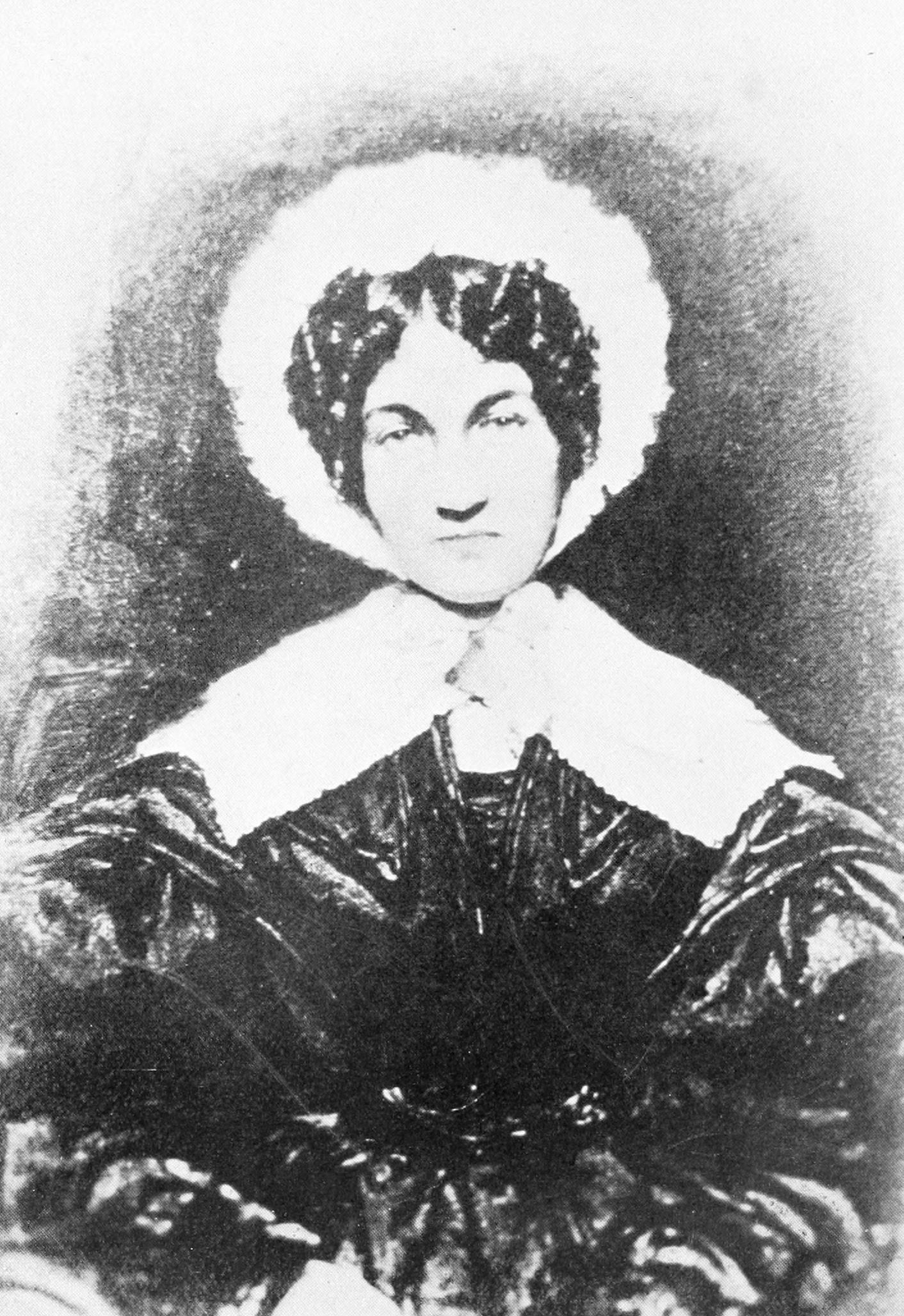
- Born: January 18, 1787; Derbyshire, England
- Died: June 18, 1874 (aged 87); Shelbyville, Kentucky, U.S.
- Occupations: Educator, philanthropist
- Spouse: John James Audubon (m. 1808–1851)
- Children: Victor Gifford Audubon, John Woodhouse Audubon, Lucy Audubon, Rose Audubon

Lucy Bakewell Audubon (née Bakewell; January 18, 1787 – June 18, 1874) was a British-born educator and philanthropist. She was the wife of John James Audubon, an American ornithologist, naturalist, and painter. As the primary provider for her family, Lucy Bakewell Audubon is said to have financially supported the publication of John James Audubon's The Birds of America, his most recognized work. In addition to providing for and supporting her husband, Audubon established two successful schools and worked feverishly to teach her students.

== Early life ==
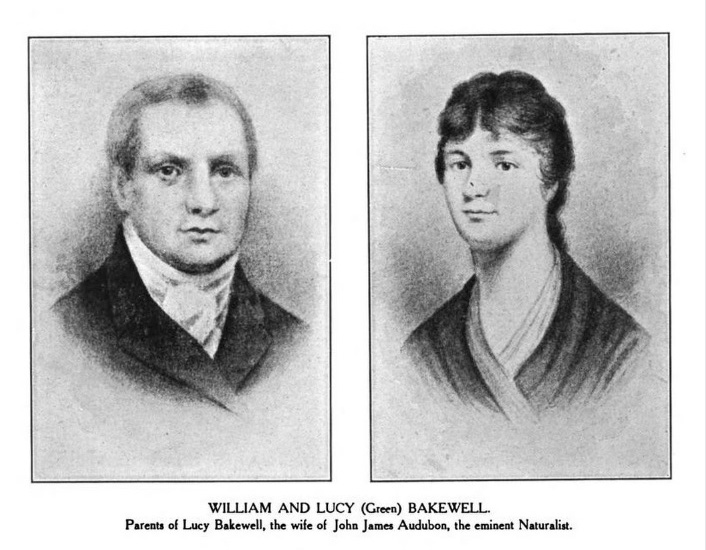
William Bakewell and Lucy Green

Lucy Bakewell was born to William and Lucy (Green) Bakewell, an affluent couple living in Derbyshire, England. Her father championed her education, believing education to be "necessary to make a woman a better companion and helpmate to the man she married." He sent Bakewell to a nearby boarding school, but her education was most enhanced by her own study. In addition to having a personal tutor as well as a mother who cared deeply about her daughter's education, Bakewell educated herself by frequently visiting her father's immense library. Tradition posits that her father's political ideologies eventually pushed him to move his family to New Haven, Connecticut, in 1798 when Bakewell was 11. However, by 1803, they again relocated to Norristown, Pennsylvania, settling on a Fatland Ford, the family's plantation. Bakewell was able to maintain a close connection with her extended family, as evidenced by a number of letters between them. Such letters have been used to determine Bakewell's history.

== Marriage and family ==
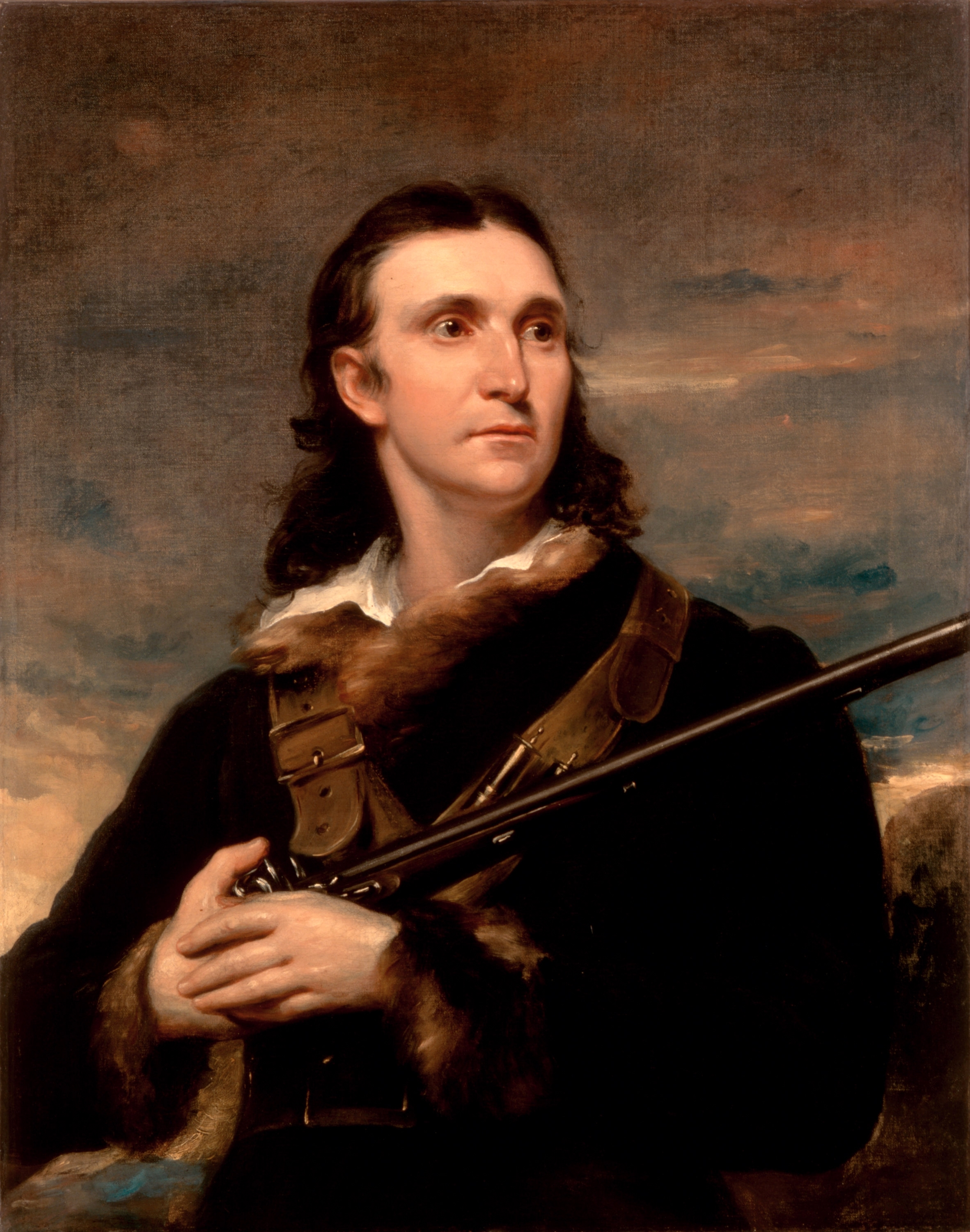
John James Audubon

It was in Pennsylvania that Bakewell met John James Audubon. Their courtship began shortly after, with John James Audubon visiting Fatland Ford often. Bakewell even frequently tutored John James in English. In exchange, John James taught Bakewell to speak French. Their courtship, however, was not without strife. François Dacosta, for example, opposed their union and worked tirelessly to end their relationship. As years passed, Bakewell continued to guide John James, encouraging him to accept a position with her uncle, Benjamin. This venture proved unsuccessful, but Bakewell resolved to marry John James. Reluctantly, William Bakewell consented to the union. Lucy Bakewell and John James Audubon were married on April 5, 1808, in the parlor at Fatland Ford. Bakewell officially became Lucy Bakewell Audubon.

The newlyweds relocated to Louisville, Kentucky. Audubon frequently assisted her husband by shopping for merchandise for his store, which ultimately closed. Before long, Audubon saw little of John James, as he spent much of his time in the woods. Still, their first son, Victor Gifford Audubon, was born in 1809. Their second child, John Woodhouse Audubon, was born in 1812. She also had two daughters, Lucy and Rose, who died in infancy.

Shortly after the birth of their son, the couple quickly lost financial stability. As John James scrambled to make ends meet for his family, Audubon met Elizabeth Speed Rankin, who asked her to tutor her children. She continued to do so as John James traveled. His absences were frequent and long, leaving Audubon in charge of the family. At one point, Audubon returned to Fatland Ford with her children.

== Career ==
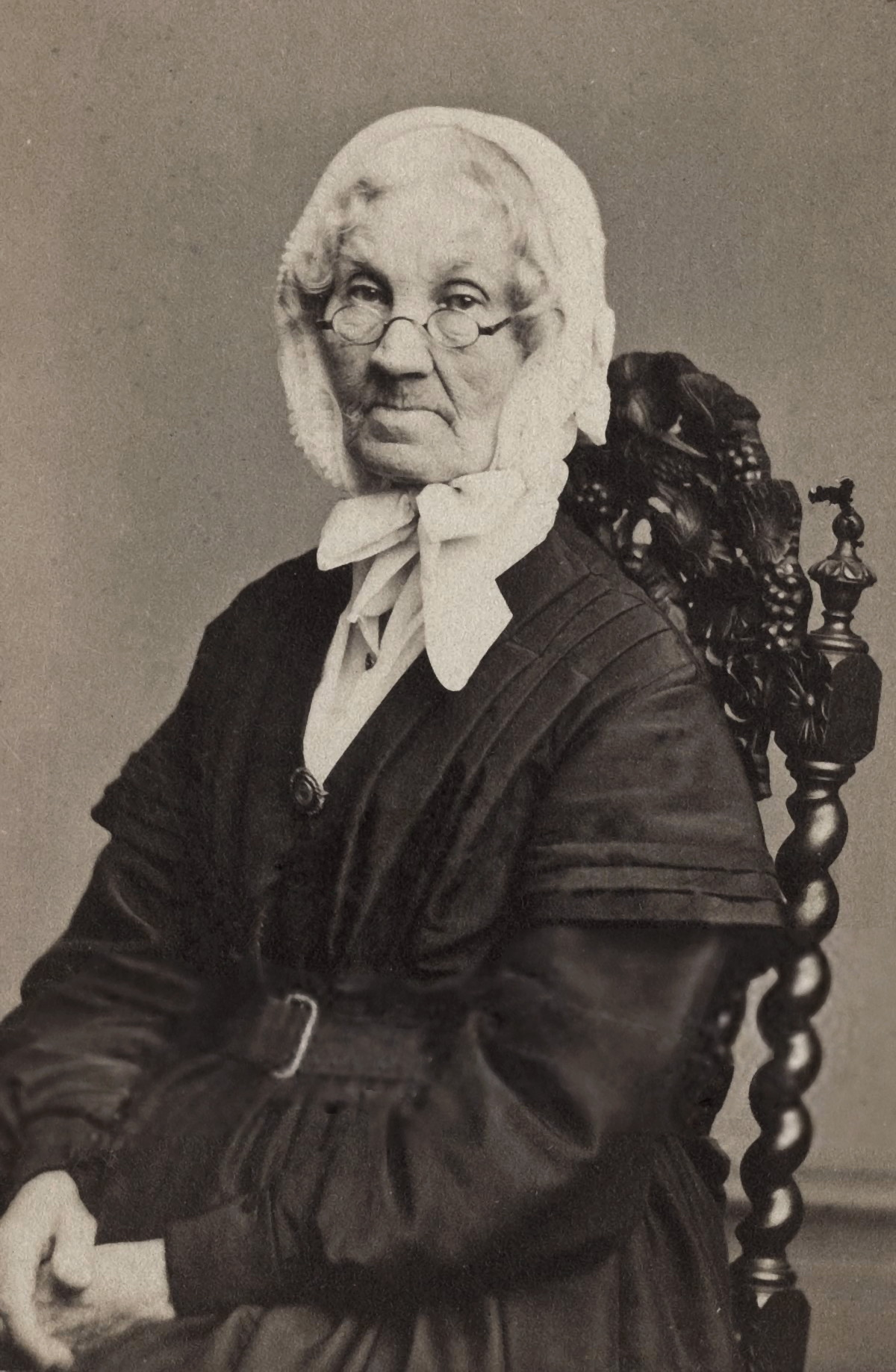
Lucy Bakewell Audubon

It is said that Audubon, despite being "brought up in comfort", eventually "became a woman of towering strength in adversity." To support her family, Audubon sought an advance on her inheritance, acquiring $8,000 from her father. John James's lengthy absences, of course, were felt by the family, but Audubon served as the ultimate "breadwinner". She worked tirelessly to support her husband's success while caring for her sons, tutoring, and serving as a governess. Audubon was later hired to work for Jane Percy of Beech Woods, a plantation in what is now West Feliciana Parish in Louisiana. In this position, Audubon was recognized as "a woman of refinement and intelligence, a well-qualified and experienced teacher." She taught a number of students, all of which were from affluent areas in Feliciana. She was considered to be a "surrogate mother" for many of her students.

John James is reported to have said: "My wife determined that my genius should prevail and that my final success as an ornithologist should become triumphant." She even managed to save $3,000 to send John James to Europe, as he was working to publish his most famous piece. For his second publication, Audubon traveled with John James and arranged for the engraving and publication of The Birds of America. Her support of his endeavors ultimately granted John James the ability to grow the family's wealth. It is said that, without Lucy Bakewell Audubon, John James Audubon would not have been as successful—if at all.

Audubon also helped create and publish The Life of John James Audubon: The Naturalist, though it is largely credited to her husband. The original publication acknowledges that it was edited "by his widow".

== Death and legacy ==
When John James died, Audubon returned to work at 70. Much like their father, Audubon's two sons experienced failed business ventures. Audubon, then, needed to support her family, again stepping up in order to serve everyone but herself. In a letter to a friend, Audubon said: "It does seem to me as if we were a doomed family, for all of us are in pecuniary difficulties more or less."

Twenty-three years after the death of John James, Lucy Audubon died at the age of 87. She had been staying with her brother, Will, in Shelbyville, Kentucky.

Though her husband is well remembered, Lucy Bakewell Audubon is often considered to be a large part of his success. She became the subject of a 1982 publication, Lucy Audubon: A Biography by Carolyn DeLatte.
