= Chris Wetherell =

American software developer and musician

Wetherell, Christopher J.
- Born: Oregon, USA
- Occupation: Software Developer
- Known for: Google Reader, Avocado, Dealership, Citizens Here and Abroad

Chris Wetherell is a software developer and musician from the US best known as the founder of Google Reader and as an influential "ex-Googler" since his departure from the company.

== Software engineer ==
While working at Google in 2005 as a Senior Software Engineer, Wetherell was involved in developing the feed aggregator Google Reader.

After leaving Google, Wetherell worked at Twitter as Consulting Project Lead on a new "Retweet" feature, co-founded Thing Labs and worked on Brizzly, before co-founding Avocado to produce an intimacy application of the same name. After witnessing the widespread use of his “retweet” option, Wetherell thought, “We might have just handed a four-year-old a loaded weapon.” Wetherell later worked on a social spin-off called Pears (Avocado closed in February 2017). Avocado was invested in by General Catalyst and Lightspeed Venture Partners among others. He's currently the CEO at Myxt.

== Musician ==
Wetherell is also a musician, performing drums and vocals for American rock bands Dealership and Citizens Here and Abroad.

== Personal life ==
Wetherell is a native of Beaverton, Oregon.
