= Nathan Wetherell (cricketer) =

English cricketer

Personal information
- Born: 24 December 1808; England
- Died: 7 February 1887 (aged 78)
- Role: Amateur cricketer

Nathan Wetherell (24 December 1808 – 7 February 1887) was an English cricketer with amateur status. He was associated with Cambridge University and made his debut in 1828.

Wetherell was educated at Winchester College and Trinity Hall, Cambridge. He was admitted to the Inner Temple and was called to the Bar in 1834.

== Bibliography ==
- Haygarth, Arthur (1996) [1862]. Scores & Biographies, Volume 1 (1744–1826). Kennington: Frederick Lillywhite. ISBN 978-19-00592-23-9.
- Haygarth, Arthur (1997) [1862]. Scores & Biographies, Volume 2 (1827–1840). Kennington: Frederick Lillywhite. ISBN 978-19-00592-23-9.
