= Mill Grove =

Historic house in Pennsylvania, United States

- U.S. National Register of Historic Places
- U.S. National Historic Landmark
- Pennsylvania state historical marker
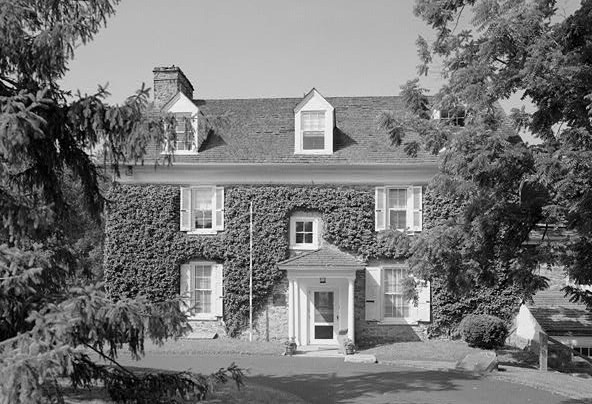
- Mill Grove

- Location within Pennsylvania Location within the United States
- Location: Pawlings Rd., Audubon, Pennsylvania
- Coordinates: 40°7′23″N 75°26′39″W
- Area: 130 acres (53 ha)
- Built: 1762
- Architect: James Morgan
- NRHP reference No.: 72001138

Significant dates
- Added to NRHP: March 16, 1972
- Designated NHL: May 5, 1989
- Designated PHMC: October 09, 1970

Mill Grove is a historic house and estate on Pawlings Road in Audubon, Pennsylvania. Built in the 1760s, it is notable as the first home in America of painter and naturalist John James Audubon (1785-1851), for whom the community is named. The 130-acre (53 ha) estate is now maintained as a museum and wildlife sanctuary by Montgomery County, and was designated a National Historic Landmark in 1989. The house serves as the educational center of the Pennsylvania chapter of the National Audubon Society, and is known as John James Audubon Center at Mill Grove.

== Description and history ==
Mill Grove is located on the west side of the village of Audubon, just north of Valley Forge National Historical Park. The estate consists of more than 130 acres (53 ha) of mainly woodlands on the south bank of Perkiomen Creek, bounded on the south by Pawlings Road. The main house is a 2 1/2-story stone structure, oriented to overlook the creek. Its roof faces are each pierced by three wood-frame gabled dormers, and there are stone chimneys at the interior of each end. A single-story ell extends the building to one side, and a gabled porch shelters the main entrance.

The house was built about 1762 by James Morgan, who also operated a mill and lead mine on the property. He built the addition in 1764 or 1765 to most likely serve as guest rooms and to have a new larger kitchen. Due to its proximity to Valley Forge, it was looted during the American Revolutionary War, although the house was spared from significant damage. The property was purchased in 1789 by Jean Audubon, a French sea captain. In 1803 he sent his eighteen-year-old son Jean (who soon anglicized his name John James Audubon) to Mill Grove to oversee further development of the mine. Instead of doing so, the young Audubon became enamored with the natural beauty of the area. In the two years he spent here, he taught himself methods of tracking birds by banding, and how to set specimens for drawings. He also became engaged to Lucy Bakewell, returning here in 1808 for the wedding. During Audubon's absence between 1805 and 1808, the property was overseen by another Frenchman, to whom Audubon sold the property following his wedding. In 1813 it was bought by Samuel Wetherill, in whose family it remained until 1951. His heirs turned the property over to the county, which has managed it since as a wildlife preserve and nature center.

The estate now comprises 175 acres (71 ha) with more than five miles (8 km) of trails. The house features a museum displaying original Audubon prints, all of his major oil paintings and memorabilia.

== See also ==
- List of National Historic Landmarks in Pennsylvania
- National Register of Historic Places listings in Montgomery County, Pennsylvania
