= Itacolumite =

Porous sandstone known for flexibility

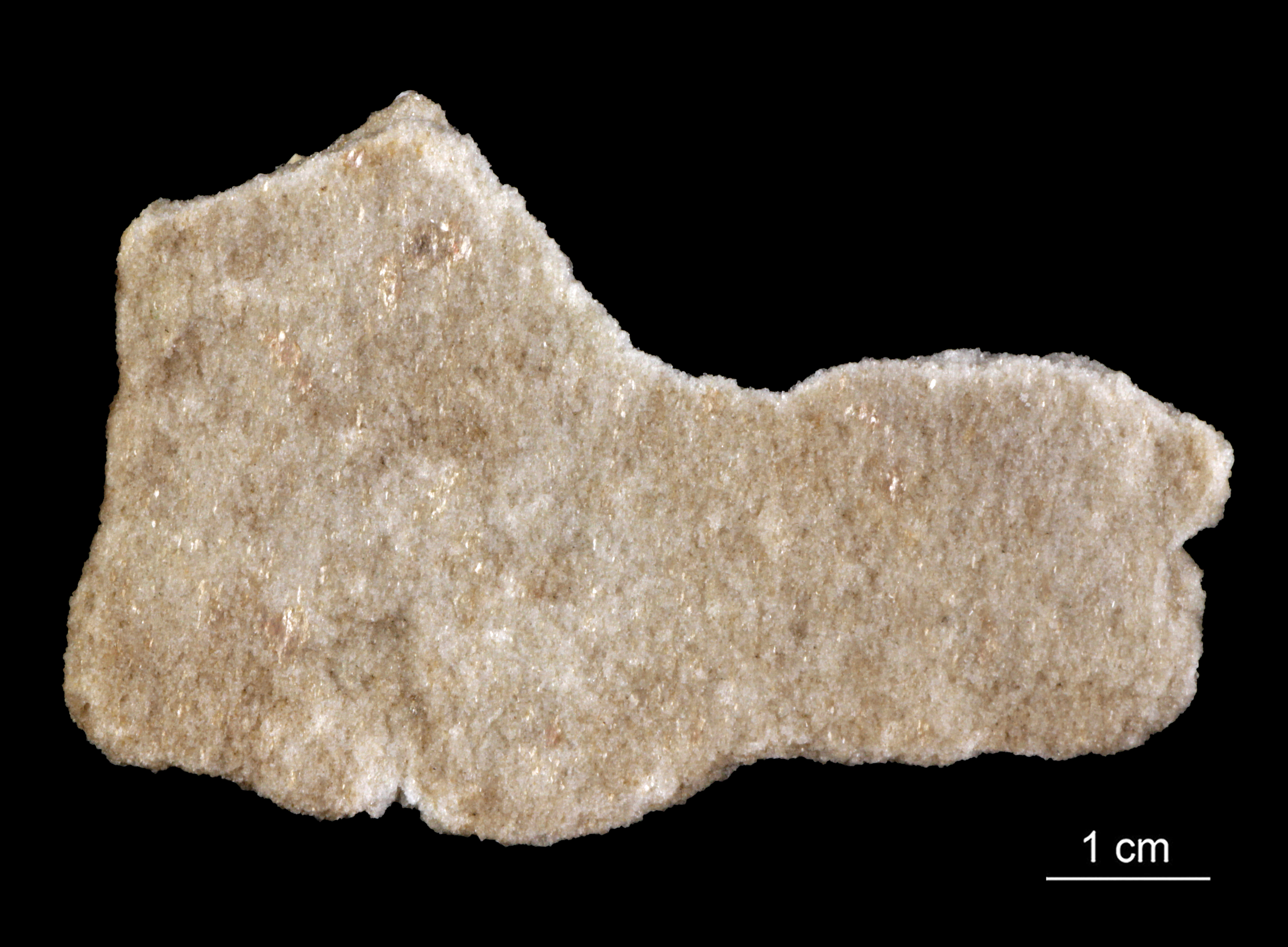
A photograph of a slab of Itacolumite

Itacolumite is a naturally occurring sandstone that is flexible when cut into relatively thin slabs. It occurs at Itacolomi, its eponym, in the southern portion of Minas Gerais, Brazil. The stone is porous, and often yellow in color. It is also found in Kaliana village (Charkhi Dadri district, Haryana, India), the U.S. state of Georgia, and Stokes and McDowell counties of North Carolina. It is the best and most widely known example of a flexible sandstone, and is a source of diamonds found in the Minas Gerais area of Brazil.

On the split faces of the slabs, scales of greenish mica are visible, but in other respects, the rock seems to be a remarkably pure specimen consisting of quartz. If a slab measuring 30-60 centimetres long and few centimetres thick is cut and then placed so that it is supported at its ends only, it will gradually bend due to its own weight. If it is then turned over it will straighten and bend in the opposite direction. Flakes a millimetre or two thick can be bent between the fingers and are said to give out a creaking sound, but specimens showing this property form only a small part of the whole mass of the rock.

== Cause of flexibility ==
Discussions have taken place regarding the exact cause of the material’s flexibility. At one time it was ascribed to the presence of thin scales of mica which were believed to permit a certain amount of motion between adjacent grains of quartz. More probably, however, it is due to the porous character of the rock together with the interlocking junctions between the individual quartz sand grains. The porosity allows interstitial movement, while the hinge-like joints by which the particles are connected hold them together in spite of the displacement.

These features are dependent to some extent on weathering, as the original rock matrix contained constituents which were later removed, leaving open cavities in their place, while at the same time additional silica may have been deposited on the quartz grains, interlocking their irregular surfaces more perfectly together. Most of the known itacolumite specimens are also fine-grained. In some cases, they are said to lose their flexibility after being dried for some time, probably because of the hardening of the interstitial substance, but many specimens kept in a dry atmosphere for years retain this property to a high degree.
