= Charles M. Wetherill =

American chemist (1825–1871)

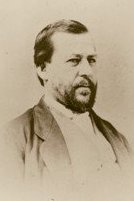
- Born: 4 November 1825; Philadelphia
- Died: 5 March 1871 (aged 45)
- Occupation: Chemist

Charles M. Wetherill (November 4, 1825 – March 5, 1871) was an American chemist. In 1862, he was appointed the first head of the Chemical Division in the newly organized U.S. Department of Agriculture, a unit that eventually became the Food and Drug Administration.

== Biography ==
Born in Philadelphia, Pennsylvania, in 1825, Wetherill was the son of Charles and Margaret. He graduated from the University of Pennsylvania in 1845 and received a Ph.D. in organic chemistry from the University of Giessen in 1848. On March 5, 1871, he died in Bethlehem, Pennsylvania, and was buried in the family plot at Laurel Hill Cemetery in Philadelphia.

He worked as a chemist, eventually becoming a chemistry professor at Lehigh University. He also studied minerals, illuminating gas, adipocere, foods, and other products. He married Mary Benbrdige in 1856.

In 1851, he was elected to the American Philosophical Society. In 1853, he opened a chemical laboratory for his private instruction and analysis and was awarded an honorary M.D. by New York Medical College. In 1862, President Abraham Lincoln appointed Wetherill the first chemist for the Chemical Division in the new Department of Agriculture. This small group eventually evolved into the Food and Drug Administration.

Wetherill tried to improve the wine industry, fertilizers and other products, and he began investigating the adulteration of agricultural products. He also studied geology, including the flexible sandstone Itacolumite. He made a chemical analysis of white sulfur water, and in 1860, he published the treatise, The Manufacture of Vinegar. He was the author of several books.

== Works ==
- Description of an Apparatus for Organic Analysis by Illuminating Gas; And on the Use of This Gas in Experimental Laboratories. Philadelphia: Barnard & Jones 1854.
- The Manufacture of Vinegar: Its Theory and Practice, with Especial Reference to the Quick Process. Philadelphia: Lindsay and Blakiston, 1860.
- History of the Religious Society of Friends. Society of Friends, 1894.
