= Wetherall =

Wetherall is a surname, and may refer to:

- David Wetherall (born 1971), English footballer
- Frances Wetherall (born 1952), British sprint canoer
- Frederick Augustus Wetherall (1754–1842), British Army general
- George Augustus Wetherall (1788–1868), British Army general
- Grace Wetherall (born 2006), Jersey cricketer
- Harry Wetherall (1889–1979), British Army general
- Jack Wetherall (born 1950), Canadian actor
