= Dealership (band) =

American indie rock band

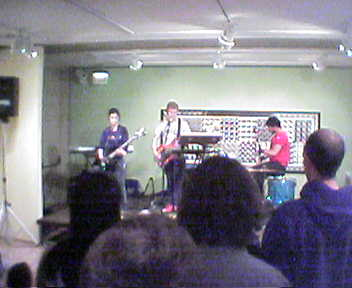

Background information
- Origin: Berkeley, California
- Genres: Indie rock, power pop, chiptune, geek rock
- Years active: 1995–2002, 2003–2008
- Labels: Turn, Keiki
- Members: Chris Groves; Jane Pinckard; Chris Wetherell; Jesse Hudson
- Website: dealershiptheband.com (not updated since 2007)

Dealership was an American indie rock band based in Berkeley, California, thought to be disbanded.

== History ==
Dealership was formed in 1995 at UC Berkeley by Chris Wetherell and his friend Chris Groves after the two had attended a Primus concert. After the concert, Wetherell went to a Guitar Center with a student loan check and said to an employee, "I would like the stuff to make a band". He bought microphones, microphone stands, a guitar amplifier, two electric guitars and a drum kit – without knowing how to play any of them. Eventually, Wetherell decided to play drums while Groves, who had played upright bass in high school, played bass guitar.

During the summer, they began holding auditions for a third band member, though these were largely unsuccessful. The auditions were held at Wetherell's place. Miyuki Jane Pinckard, who was dating Wetherell's roommate at the time, heard many of these auditions. Understanding that the auditions were going poorly, Pinckard decided to learn to play the guitar herself. Within weeks, the trio became Dealership.

In 1998, Dealership self-released their first album, Secret American Livingroom. The band then briefly ran their own record label, Keiki Records, on which they released their second full-length album, TV Highway to the Stars, in 2001. Keiki Records also distributed releases by the now-inactive San Francisco band Secadora, of which Chris Groves was a member. The band's third album, Action/Adventure, was released on Turn Records, based in Santa Clara, California, in 2004.

In 2005, Dealership went on their first (and only) tour of the United States. They also played at the X-Games. Jesse Hudson joined the band in late 2006. Recording was begun on a fourth unreleased album, The Future is Far Away, with an estimated 2008 release date. In November 2007, Pinckard announced on the game girl advance blog that Harmonix included the song "Dots and Dashes" in its iPod rhythm game Phase, and noted that the track would be sold on iTunes. "Dots and Dashes" was to appear on the upcoming album. Their song "Database Corrupted" is a downloadable track in Rock Band 2. Since the announcement of The Future is Far Away, no official word has been heard from the band and it is thought to be disbanded.

== Band members ==
Current members

- Chris Groves — lead vocals, bass guitar
- Jane Pinckard — keyboards, vocals (2006—present), guitar, vocals (1995–2006)
- Chris Wetherell — drums, vocals
- Jesse Hudson — guitar, bass (2006—present)

== Discography ==
Albums

- Secret American Livingroom (1998, self-released)
- TV Highway to the Stars (2001, Keiki Records)
- Action/Adventure (2004, Turn Records)
- The Future Is Far Away (unreleased)

Other releases

- Model Mortal / Domesticated 7" (2000, self-released)

Compilations

- Noise Pop '99 - Souvenir Seven Inches (1999, 1 song)
- Live 105 Local Lounge Vol.21 (1999, 1 song)
- Cool Beans No. 11 (1999, 1 song)
- Bored, Lonely and a Little Pissed Off (1999, 1 song)
- Ten Years of Noisepop (2002, 1 song)

Music Videos

- All The Kids (2004)
- Forest (December 2005)
