= Rio Rita =

Rio Rita may refer to:

- Rio Rita (musical), a 1927 musical
- Rio Rita (1929 film), starring Bebe Daniels and John Boles
- Rio Rita (1942 film), starring Abbott and Costello as the comedy relief
- Rio Rita, a character in the Femforce comic book series published by AC Comics
- Río Rita, a town in Panama
- Rio Rita, a main river passing through East China Normal University in Shanghai, which is synonymous with the university.
