= Columbia University Irving Medical Center =

Academic medical center of Columbia University

- NewYork-Presbyterian Hospital

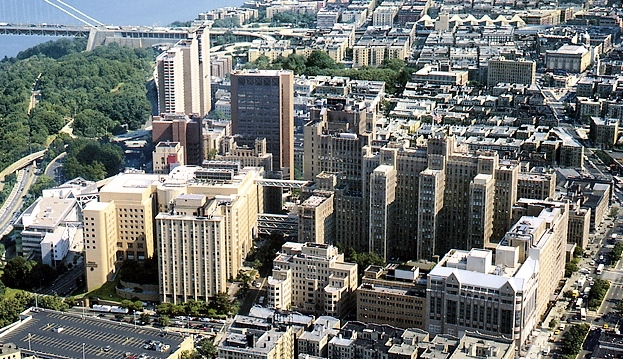

Geography
- Location: Roughly bounded by: west: Riverside Drive north: West 169th Street east: Audubon Avenue south: West 165th Street, Washington Heights, Manhattan, New York City, U.S.
- Coordinates: 40°50′28.3″N 73°56′26.9″W

Organisation
- Type: Teaching
- Affiliated university: Columbia University

History
- Founded: 1767

Links
- Website: cuimc.columbia.edu
- Lists: Hospitals in U.S.

Columbia University Irving Medical Center (CUIMC) is the academic medical center of Columbia University and the largest campus of NewYork-Presbyterian Hospital. The center's academic wing consists of Columbia's colleges and schools of Physicians and Surgeons, Dental Medicine, Nursing, and Public Health.

The center's healthcare wing include Morgan Stanley Children's Hospital, New York State Psychiatric Institute, and the Audubon Biomedical Research Park. The center is located in the Washington Heights neighborhood of Upper Manhattan, New York City.

The campus covers several blocks—primarily between West 165th and 169th Streets from Riverside Drive to Audubon Avenue.

== History ==
The medical center was built in the 1920s on the site of Hilltop Park, the one-time home stadium of the New York Yankees. The land was donated by Edward Harkness, who also donated most of the financing for the original buildings. Built specifically to house a medical school and Presbyterian Hospital, it was the first academic medical center in the world. Formerly known as the Columbia-Presbyterian Medical Center (CPMC), the name change followed the 1997 formation of NewYork-Presbyterian Hospital, a merger of two medical centers each affiliated with an Ivy League university: Columbia-Presbyterian with Columbia University, and New York Hospital-Cornell Medical Center, with Cornell University's Weill Cornell Medical College.

The Medical and Graduate Education Building was designed by architects Diller Scofidio + Renfro and Gensler, and the structural engineer was Leslie E. Robertson Associates.

In September 2016, the campus was renamed as Columbia University Irving Medical Center, for one of the hospital and the university's largest benefactors, Herbert and Florence Irving. Herbert Irving was a co-founder and former vice-chairman of Sysco.

The hospital completed the first successful heart transplant in a child, the first use of the anti-seizure medication, dilantin, to treat epilepsy, and the isolation of the first known odour receptors in the nose.

The institution supported discoveries related to how memory is stored in the brain, and Nobel Prize-winning developments in cardiac catheterization (1956) and cryo-electron microscopy (2017).

In 2023, The Roy and Diana Vagelos Institute for Basic Biomedical Science was established with a $400 million donation from P. Roy Vagelos.

In January 2026, Jennifer L. Mnookin was announced as President of the university.

== Gallery ==
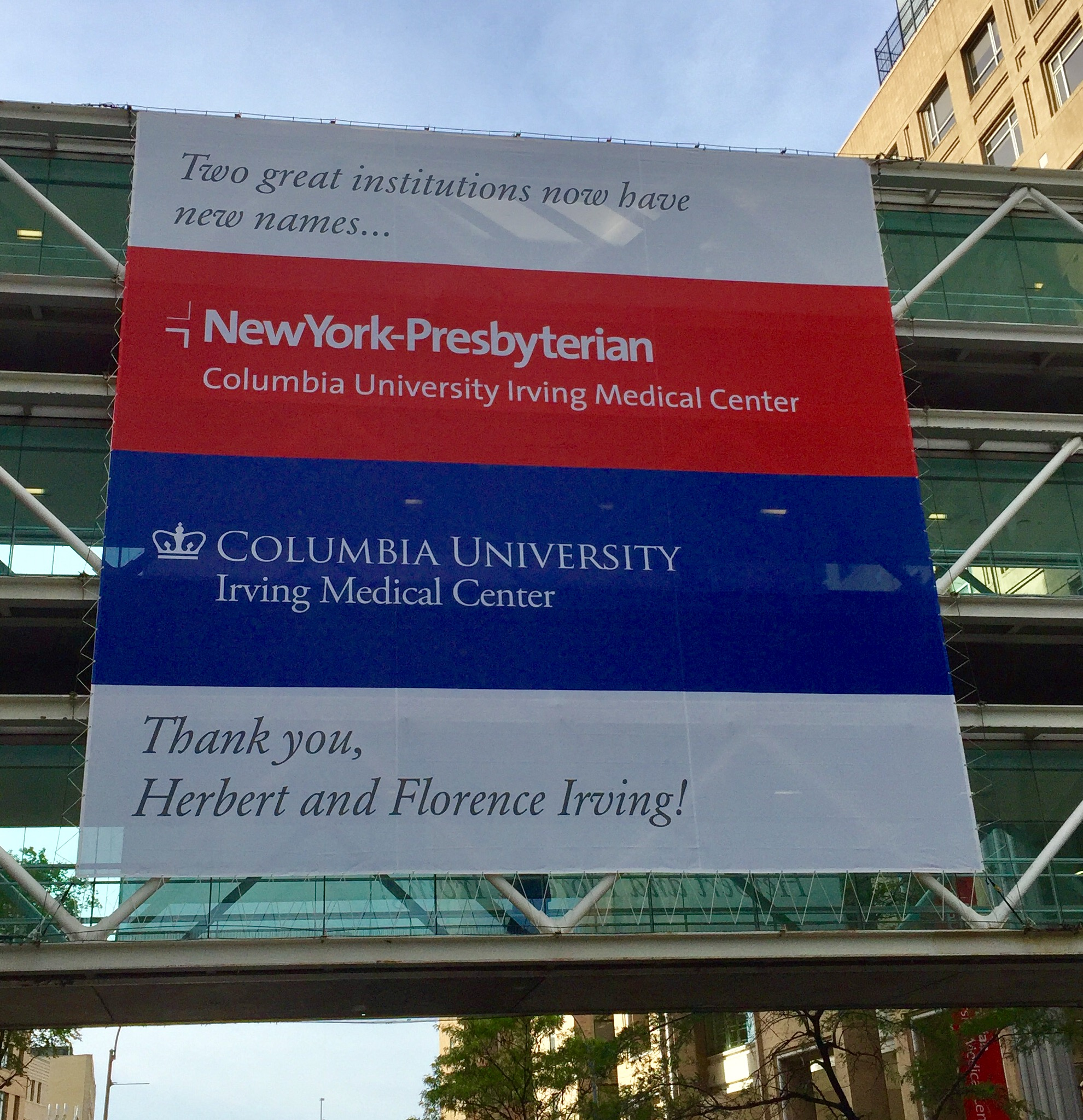

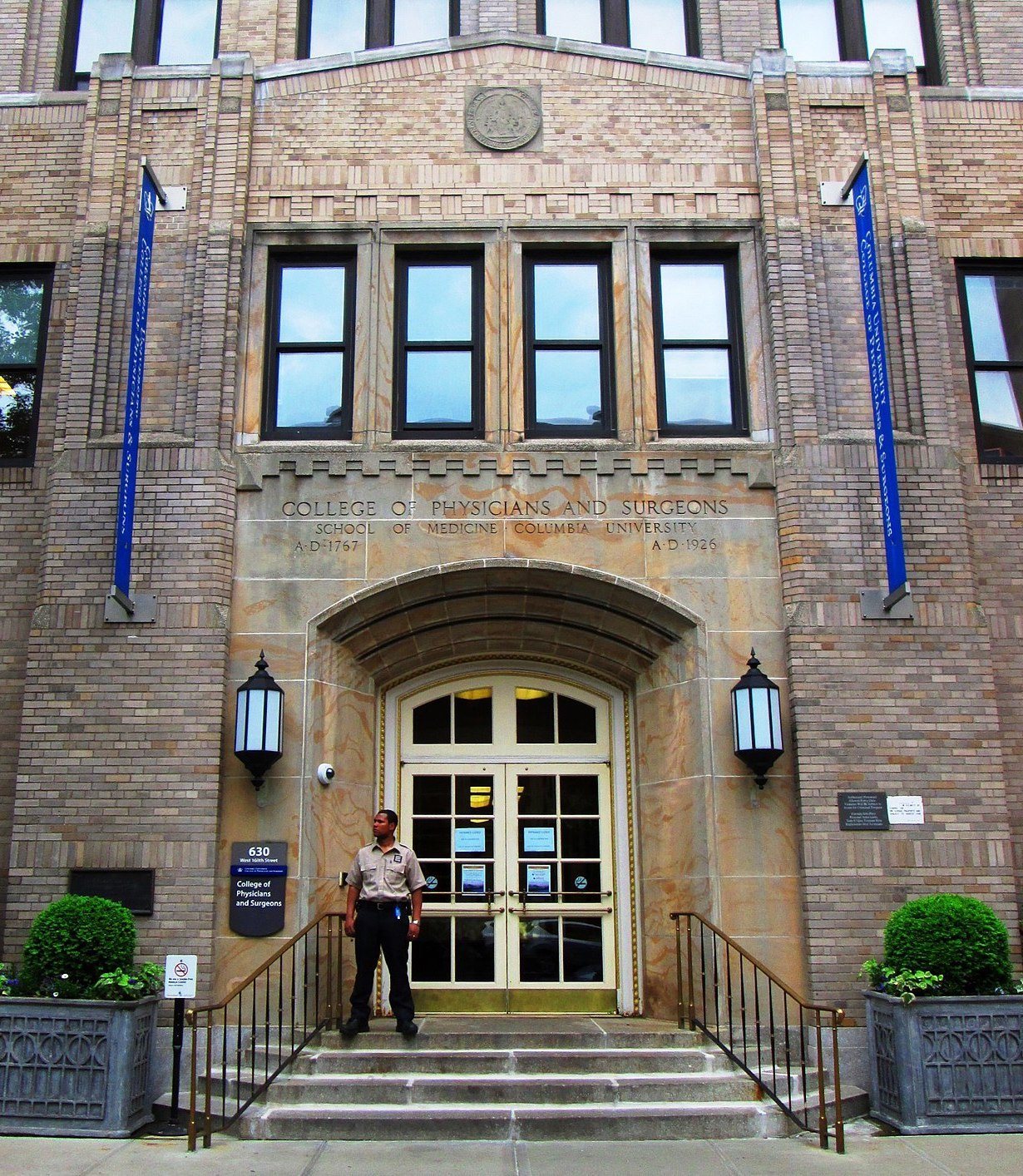
Entrance to the Columbia University Vagelos College of Physicians and Surgeons

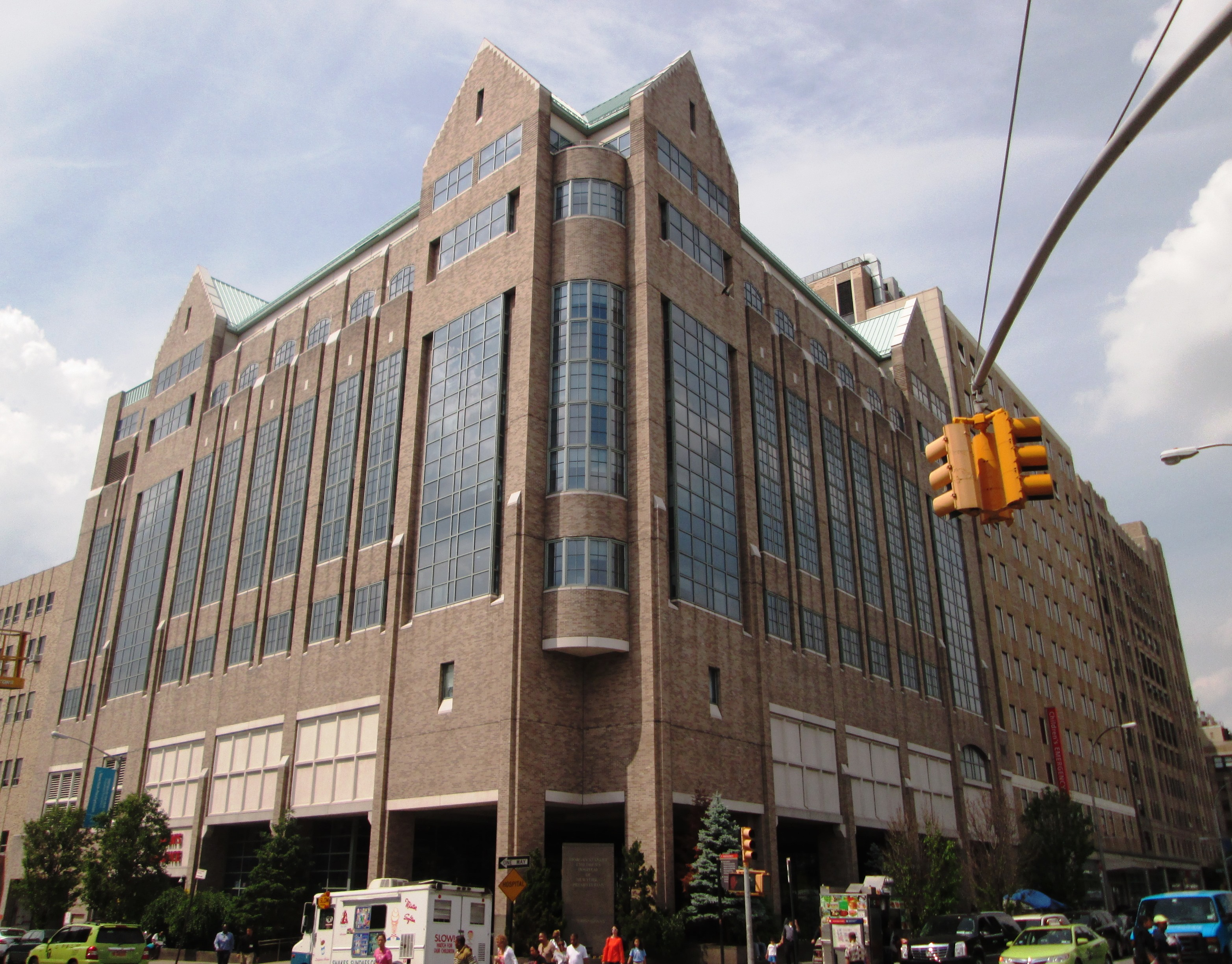
Morgan Stanley Children's Hospital

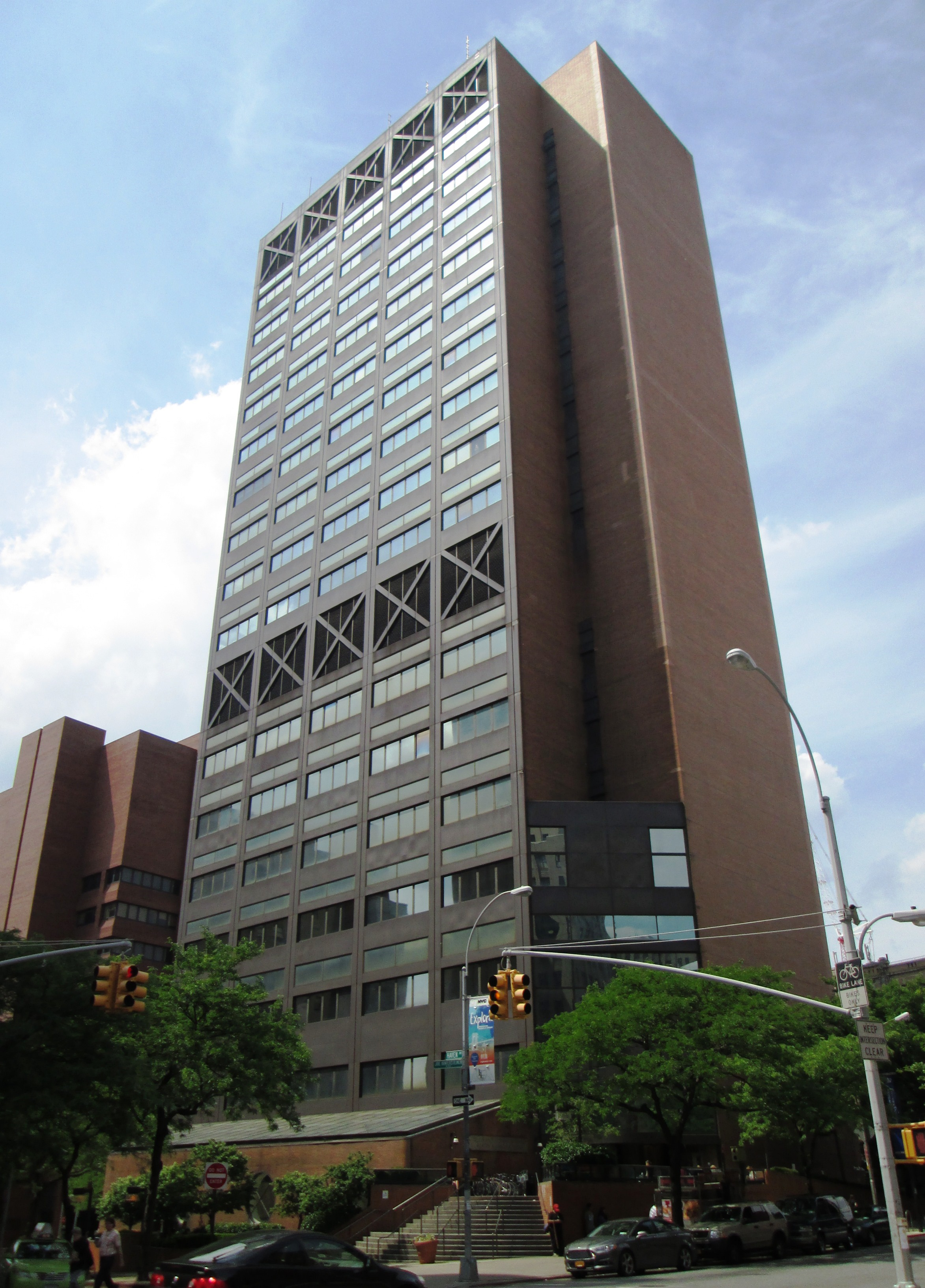
Hammer Health Science Center

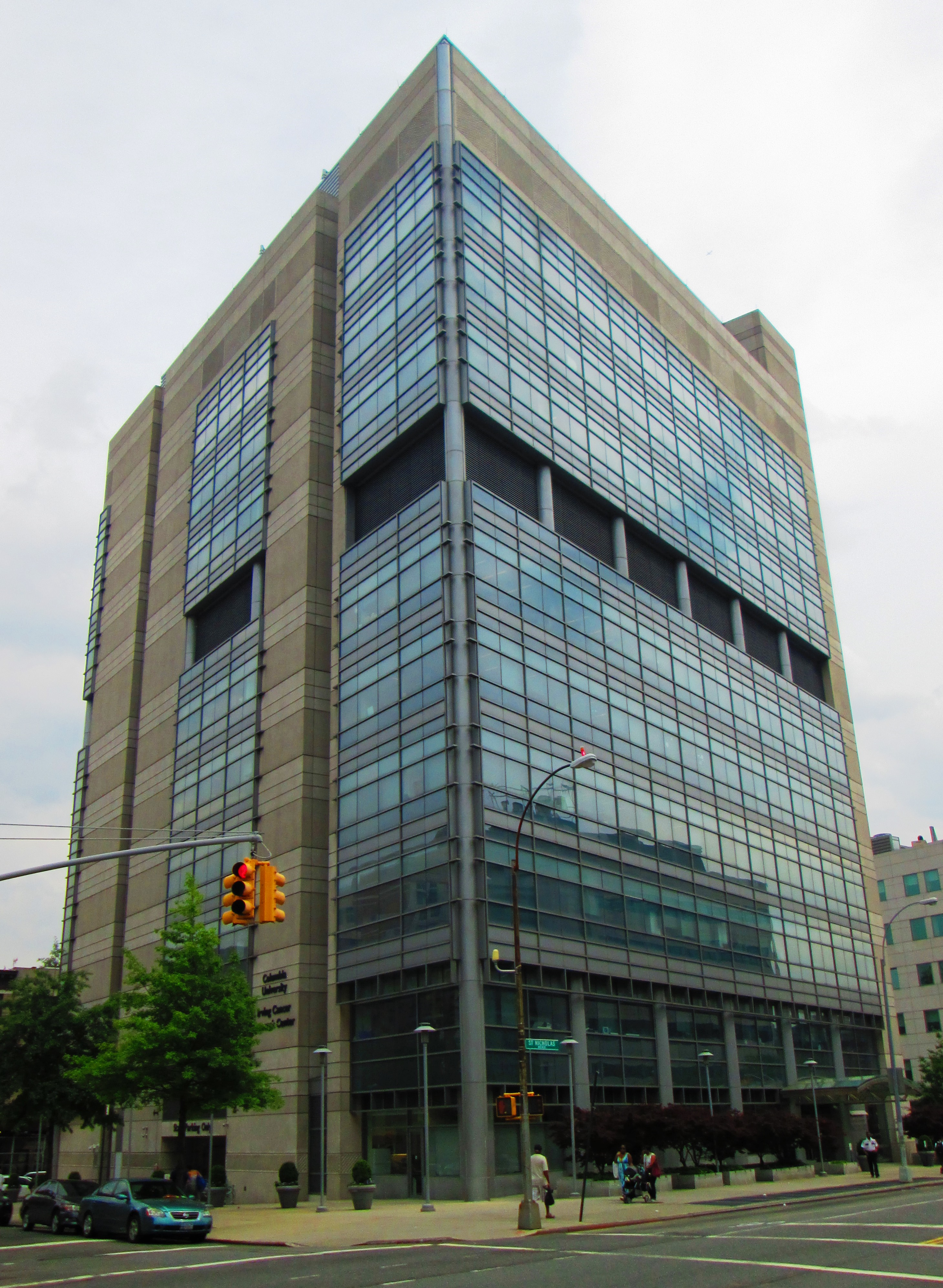
Irving Cancer Research Center

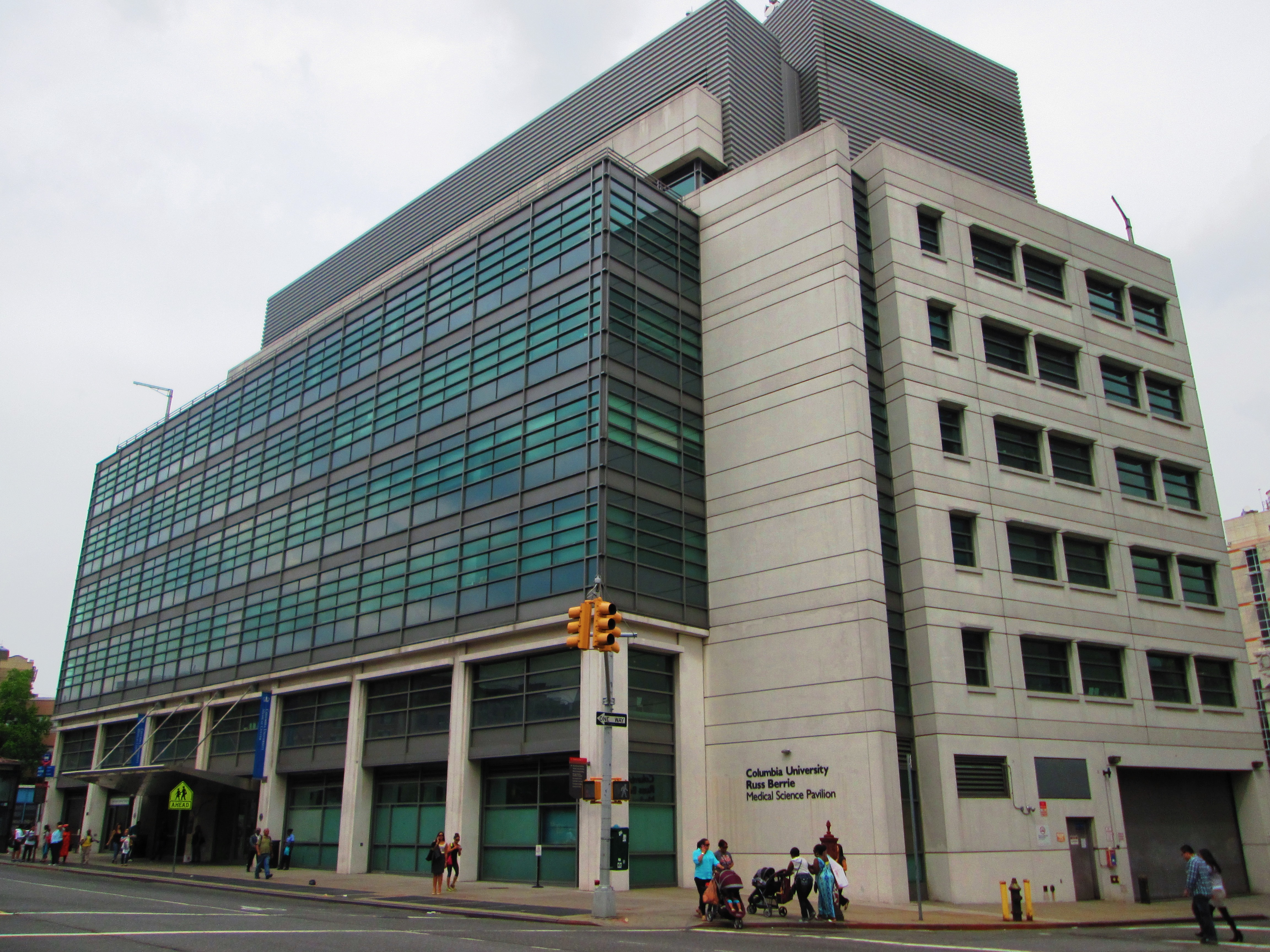
Russ Berrie Medical Science Pavilion

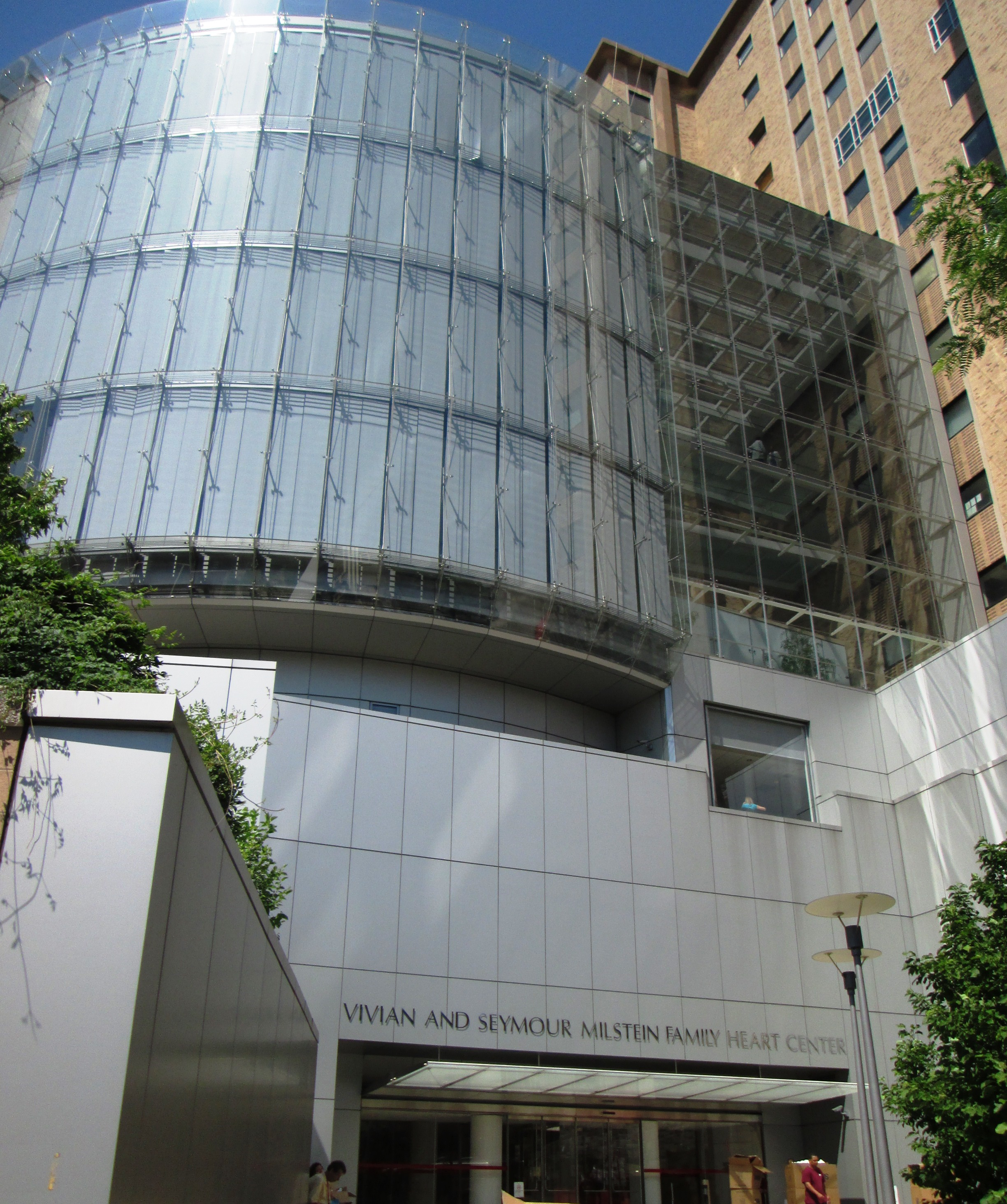
Vivian and Seymour Milstein Family Heart Center

Edward S. Harkness Eye Institute

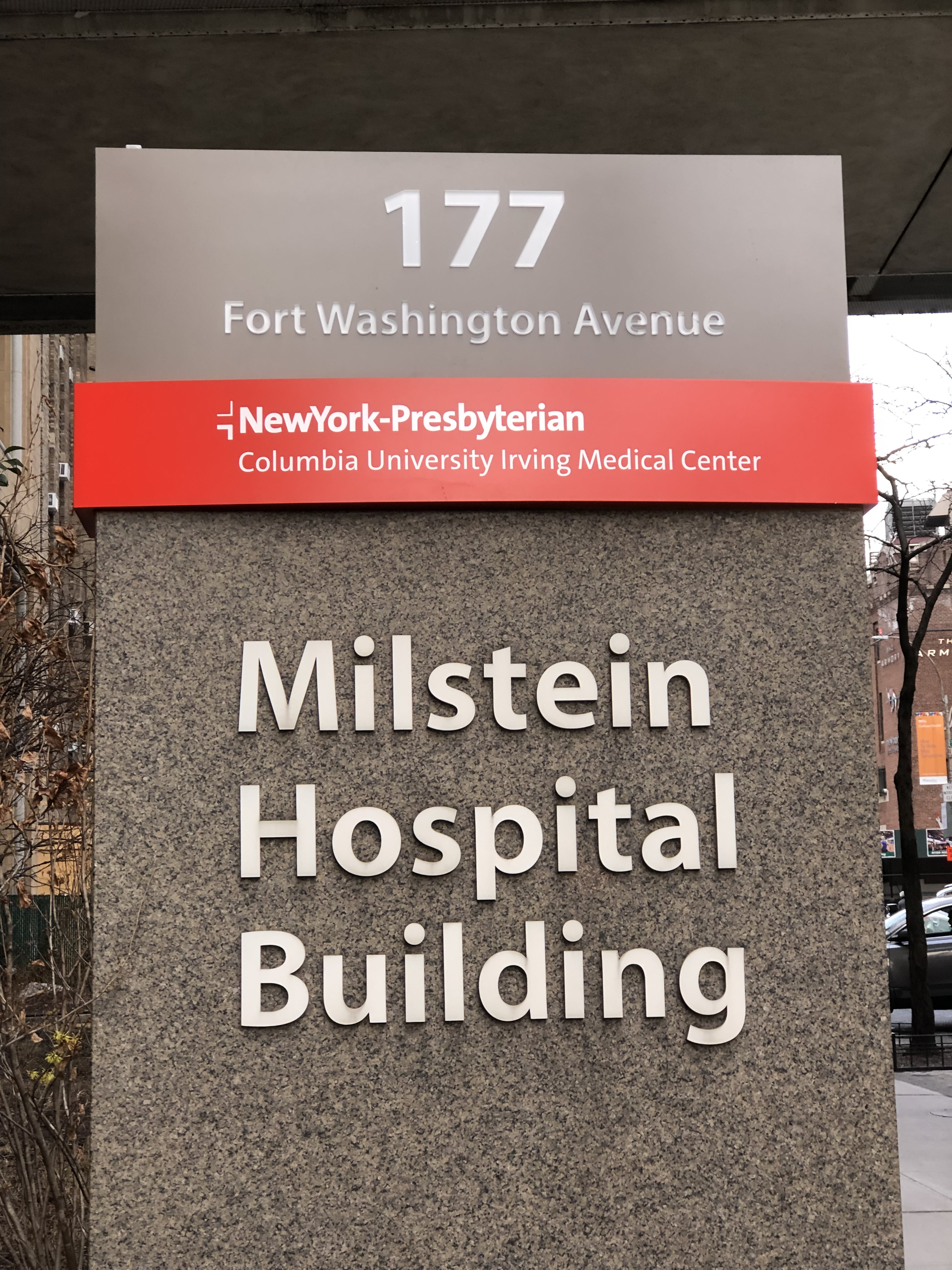
Milstein Hospital Building

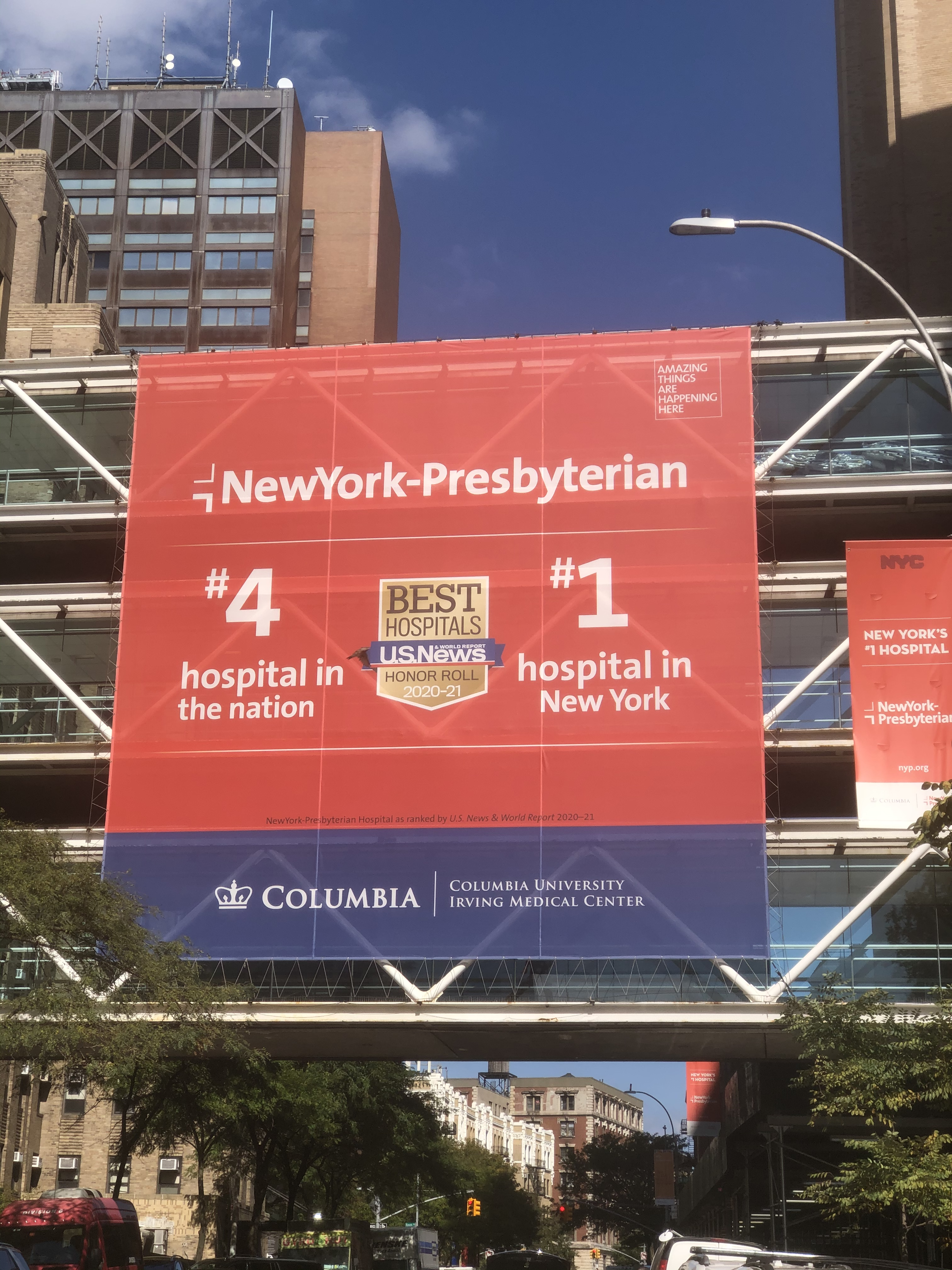
