= Audubon Park, Manhattan =

Historic district in Manhattan, New York

- Audubon Park Historic District
- U.S. National Register of Historic Places
- U.S. Historic district
- New York State Register of Historic Places
- New York City Landmark
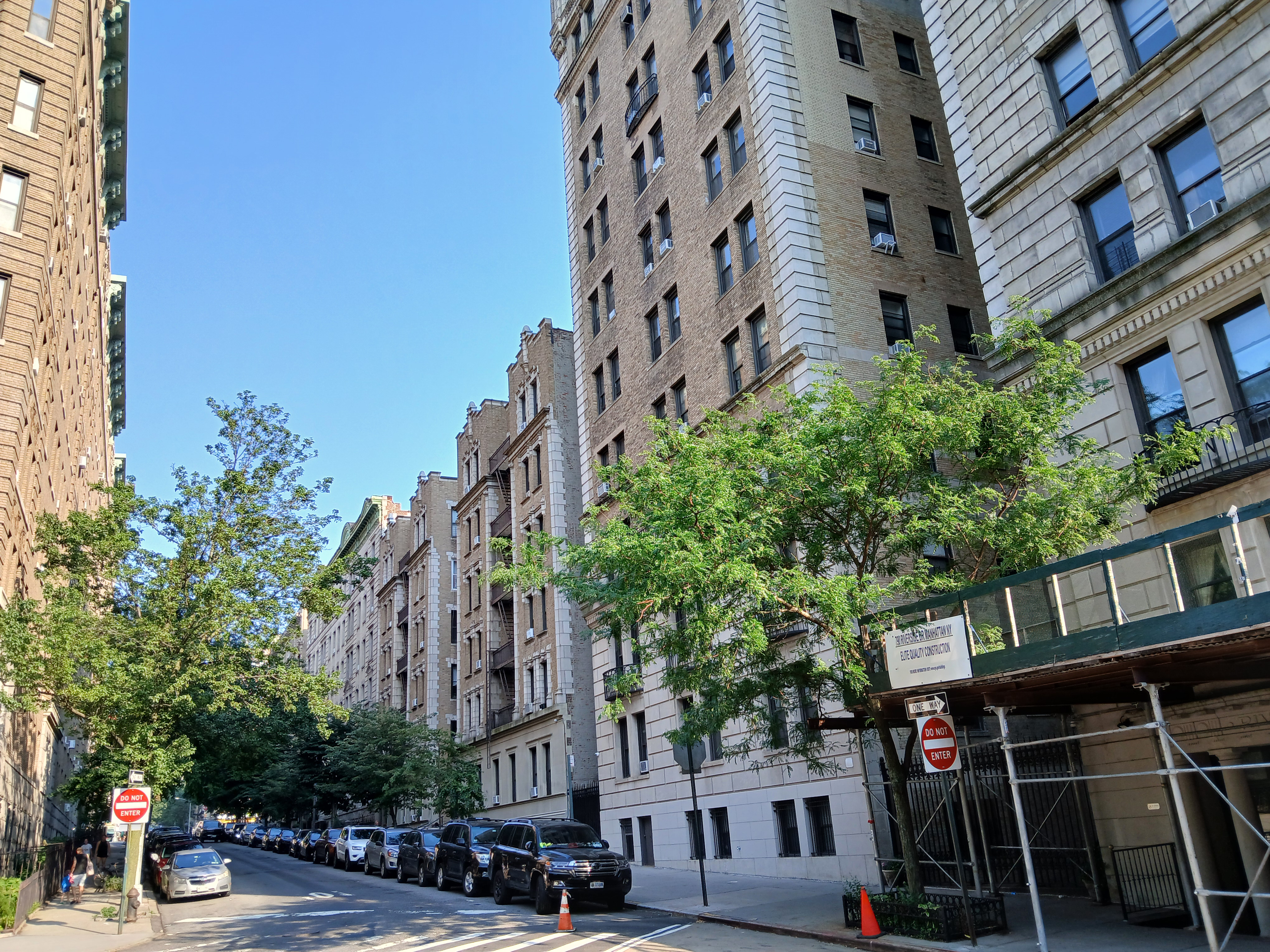
- Buildings in the historic district on 157th Street as seen from Riverside Drive

- Location within Manhattan Location within New York City Location within New York Location within the United States
- Location: Generally Broadway, Riverside Drive, Riverside Drive West, and West 155th & 158th Sts., Manhattan, New York, US
- Coordinates: 40°50′6″N 73°56′51″W
- Area: 15 acres (6.1 ha)
- Architect: Multiple
- Architectural style: Renaissance Revival, Beaux Arts, Arts and Crafts, Medieval Revival, and Mediterranean Revival
- NRHP reference No.: 100010615
- NYCL No.: 2335

Significant dates
- Added to NRHP: August 9, 2024
- Designated NYSRHP: June 12, 2024
- Designated NYCL: May 12, 2009

Audubon Park is a historic district in the Washington Heights neighborhood of Manhattan in New York City, New York, US. It is roughly bounded by 155th Street to the south, 158th Street to the north, Broadway and Edward M. Morgan Place to the east, and Riverside Drive to the west. Audubon Park consists primarily of apartment buildings, along with some houses and the Audubon Terrace cultural complex. Most of the buildings are covered by two official landmark designations: a city historic district, designated by the New York City Landmarks Preservation Commission (LPC) in 2009, and a national district, listed on the National Register of Historic Places (NRHP) in 2024. Seventeen apartment buildings and one pair of duplex houses are within both designations, while additional properties fall within only one designation.

Audubon Park consists largely of apartment buildings measuring 5 to 13 stories high, which were designed by prolific apartment-house architects. Built in two phases during the early 20th century, they represent a variety of styles and include ornate facades and light courts. Many of the apartment buildings were developed in groups and were given names relating to the neighborhood's history or occupants. The district also includes two duplex residences at 809 and 811 Riverside Drive; twelve rowhouses on 158th Street (six of which have been demolished); and eight institutional buildings in Audubon Terrace.

Audubon Park was originally a hunting ground for the indigenous Wecquaesgeek people before being settled in the 17th century. In 1841, the naturalist John James Audubon began assembling land for a 21-acre (8.5 ha) estate he called Minniesland, where he built a house. After his death in 1851, the estate was subdivided and resold, becoming known as Audubon Park. A small number of houses were built in the district, and the Grinnell family came to own most of the land by the late 19th century. The construction of Riverside Drive and the New York City Subway spurred the construction of apartment houses starting in the 1900s. Apartment development took three decades and was mostly complete by 1932; a small part remained undeveloped into the 1960s. Due to deterioration, the district's quality of life decreased after World War II before improving from the 1980s onward.

== Site and boundaries ==
Audubon Park includes two overlapping historic district designations in the Washington Heights neighborhood of Manhattan in New York City. One designation is on the National Register of Historic Places (NRHP), and the other is a New York City Landmarks Preservation Commission (LPC) designation. Both designations are centered around a curved section of Riverside Drive between 155th Street to the south and 158th Street to the north. Just south of the district is the Trinity Church Cemetery, a wooded burial ground facing the district's apartment buildings.

The LPC designation consists of 19 apartment buildings and one pair of duplex houses, spread across five city blocks. Two apartment buildings at 609 and 611 West 158th Street are only part of the LPC designation. The NRHP district consists of 39 contributing properties, which cover 15 acres (6.1 ha) across parts of four blocks. These include 19 properties in the LPC designation: 17 apartment houses and the pair of duplex houses. The NRHP designation encompasses the eight-building Audubon Terrace complex (itself a separately-designated city and NRHP district) to the southeast. When the NRHP designation was made in 2024, it included 12 rowhouses on 158th Street that were not part of any LPC designation; six of the houses have since been demolished.

=== Street grid ===
The district deviates significantly from the Manhattan street grid, which consists mostly of city blocks with wide west–east and narrow north–south dimensions. The district's west–east streets (155th through 158th streets, from south to north) largely parallel the rest of the grid, but the north–south streets have curves and diagonals. This is because of the topography of the district, which has a steep cliff at its western end, dipping toward the Hudson River. The presence of this cliff also requires Riverside Drive West, at the district's western edge, to be carried on a viaduct; this viaduct dates from 1928.

At the district's eastern boundary, what is now Broadway was built as part of the "Grand Boulevard", built after the American Civil War, between 59th Street to the south and 155th Street to the north. North of there was the Boulevard Lafayette, which ran northwest to the Hudson River shoreline and was mostly incorporated into Riverside Drive in the early 20th century. The section of the former Boulevard Lafayette from 158th to 157th streets, running diagonally northwest–southeast, was renamed Audubon Place in 1909 and Edward M. Morgan Place (after a former US postmaster) in 1926. South of 157th Street, the former Boulevard Lafayette is a slip road that merges into Broadway; this slip road is legally considered part of Broadway.

Near the western end of the district, Riverside Drive curves sharply. As a result, Riverside Drive intersects itself at right angles twice within the district. Approaching from the south, near 155th Street, Riverside Drive turns east at a T-intersection; northbound traffic going straight on Riverside Drive continues onto Riverside Drive West. East of this intersection, Riverside Drive curves north and then northeast. Originally, the western frontage of Riverside Drive had a retaining wall due to the steep topography; the land west of it was 40 feet (12 m) or 60 feet (18 m) below. Riverside Drive contains a 150-by-40-foot (46 by 12 m) traffic oval known as Riverside Oval (formally known as Charles and Murray Gordon Memorial Park), which contains an octagonal stone fountain, the northernmost of four built on Riverside Drive. At 158th Street and Morgan Place is a five-pointed intersection where northeast-bound Riverside Drive turns northwest. A private road, running between Riverside Drive and Riverside Drive West, was built in the 1850s by the Audubon family, a previous landowner.

Audubon Park: Line indicates path taken by Riverside Drive through Audubon Park; NRHP and LPC designations; LPC designation only; NRHP designation only

== Architecture ==
=== Apartment buildings ===
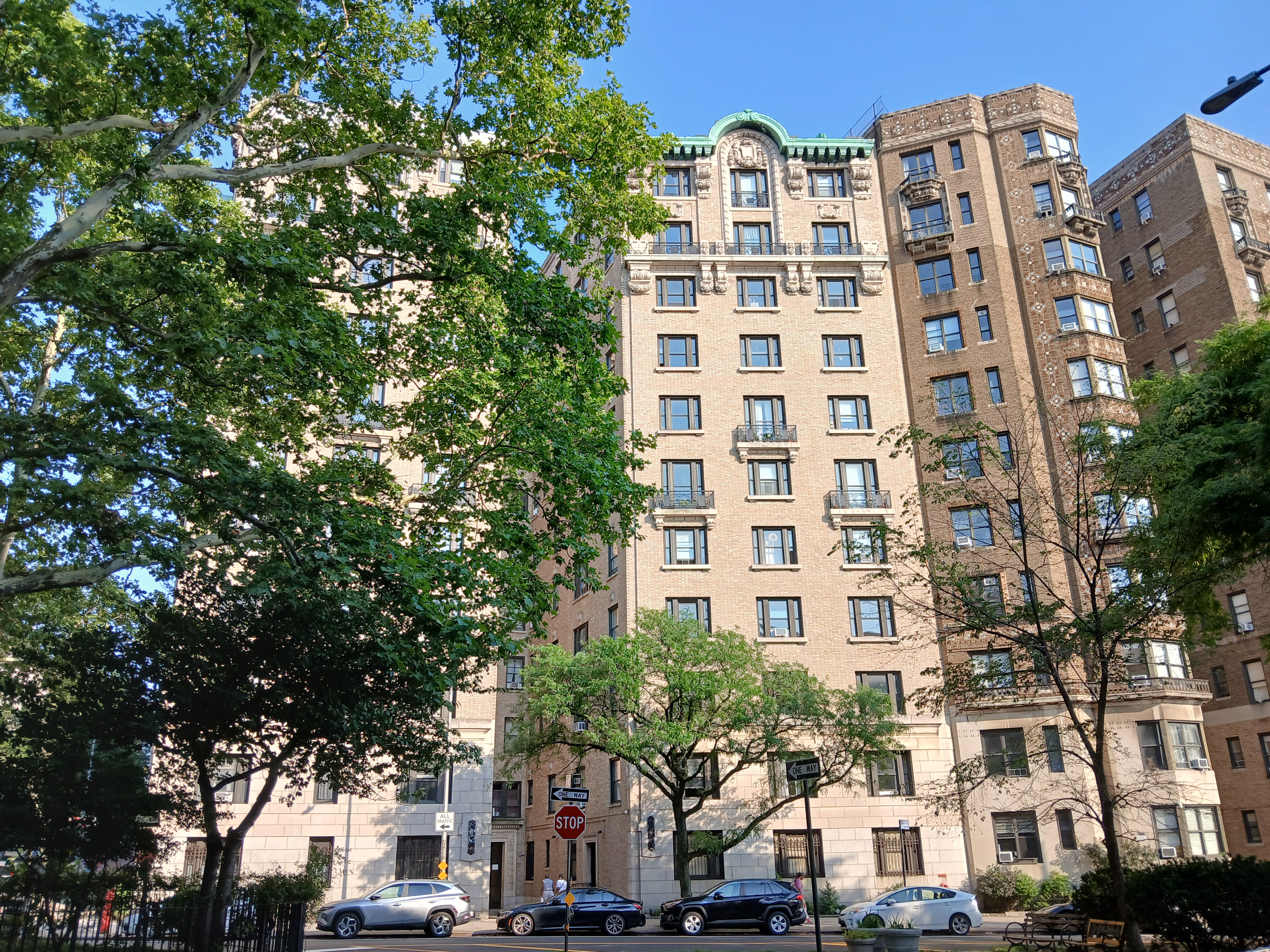
The Rhinecliff (left) and the Vauxhall (right) on Riverside Drive

Audubon Park consists largely of early-20th-century apartment buildings measuring 5 to 13 stories high. Many of these buildings are taller than others in Washington Heights (which are generally 5 or 6 stories), leading architectural writer Christopher Gray to call it "a memorable enclave". The buildings were designed by architects with considerable experience designing New York City apartment houses, such as Neville & Bagge, George Blum and Edward Blum, Schwartz & Gross, Denby & Nute, and George F. Pelham. Pelham was the most prolific apartment-building designer in the district, having devised plans for four extant buildings, as well as proposals for several unbuilt structures. The district's oldest apartment buildings date from the 1900s, while the newest buildings date from 1931 or 1932. The buildings represent two phases of construction: the pre- and post-World War I eras. The pre-war buildings were constructed predominantly in the Renaissance Revival style, and some were built in the Beaux Arts style. Arts and Crafts and Medieval Revival buildings were developed in both eras, while the district's Mediterranean Revival buildings mostly date from the post-war era.

As with earlier buildings located farther south, these buildings had ornate facades that were intended to attract what the writer Andrew Alpern called "middle-class families with upper-class pretensions". Brick, limestone, and architectural terracotta in light colors are common to many of the building's apartment buildings, and several also have elaborate pressed metal or tiled cornices. The floor plans vary, but many of the buildings have light courts, creating U-shaped or H-shaped floor plans. Some of the buildings have O-shaped plans, and one building, the Cortez at 625 West 157th Street, has a T-shaped plan because of its narrow lot. Only two buildings in the district—Audubon Hall and Hispania Hall, on the west side of Broadway between 156th and 157th streets—have storefronts; restrictive covenants originally forbade storefronts except on Broadway or Audubon (Morgan) Place. Inside, the buildings were constructed with lobbies with decorations such as brick and faience, and the apartments themselves were divided into communal and private spaces. Many buildings had separate servant entrances, along with amenities such as on-site laundries and en-suite telephones.

Several apartment buildings were built as part of a group. For example, Audubon and Hispania halls were jointly developed by the Fleischmann Brothers Corporation and have similar Renaissance Revival designs, and the Goya and Velasquez on 156th Street, built by O'Brien Estates, also have a Renaissance Revival style with nearly identical O-shaped plans. 765 and 775 Riverside Drive and 156-08 Riverside Drive West, at the corner with these two streets, are all designed in a medieval revival style and were intended as a single architectural composition; they are sometimes described as a single complex, originally built with 233 apartments. Some buildings' names, such as the Grinnell and Audubon Hall, were inspired by previous occupants or the district's history. Because of the presence of the Hispanic Society of America at Audubon Terrace, several buildings such as the Cortez, Goya, and Velasquez carry Spanish names. Other names were selected for their cultural or historical undertones, and the newest buildings were referenced solely by their addresses.

Building name (Note: As given by Landmarks Preservation Commission 2009 or National Park Service 2024 unless otherwise stated; refer to the Notes section for details.)	Location	Architect	Developer	Date completed	Description and features	Notes
156-08 Riverside Drive West (Note: Erroneously cited as 158-06 Riverside Drive West in National Park Service 2024, p. 18.)	156-08 Riverside Drive West 40.8350°N 73.9486°W	George G. Miller	New Viaduct Building Corp.	1930	A six-story, H-shaped medieval revival building with a brick facade and terracotta decorations. It has a courtyard facing Riverside Drive West on the west, and light courts on the other three sides. The building retains most of its original apartments with little subdivision; each unit has 2–5 rooms.	
609 West 158th Street	609 West 158th Street 40.8351°N 73.9449°W	Joseph C. Cocker	Kuhn & Lawson	1905	A 5-story Renaissance Revival building with buff brick facade and limestone decorations. The building retains most of its original apartments with little subdivision; there are five apartments per floor with 3–6 rooms each. This building is only part of the LPC listing and is excluded from the NRHP district.	
765 Riverside Drive	765 Riverside Drive (@ Riverside Dr. W) 40.8345°N 73.9486°W	Schaefer & Rutkins	Audubon Park Building Corp.	1932	A six-story, H-shaped medieval revival building with a brick facade and brick-and-terracotta decorations. The building is constructed on 85-foot-high (26 m) stilts that are sunken partially into the bedrock. The building retains most of its original apartments with little subdivision; each unit has 2–5 rooms.	
775 Riverside Drive / The John James	775 Riverside Drive 40.8348°N 73.9481°W	George G. Miller	New Viaduct Building Corp.	1932	A six-story, H-shaped medieval revival building with a brick facade and terracotta decorations. The building retains most of its original apartments with little subdivision; each unit has 2–5 rooms.	
Audubon Hall / Audubon Court	3765 Broadway (@ 157th St.) 40.8342°N 73.9456°W	George F. Pelham	Fleischmann Brothers Corp.	1909	A six-story, Renaissance Revival building with a brick, limestone, and terracotta facade and an interior light court. Because the building sits both on a curve and at a corner, it has an irregularly shaped floor plan. The fire escapes are recessed into the facade due to a restrictive covenant. Audubon Hall is divided into suites with 4–9 rooms each. The building retains most of its original 41 units with little subdivision. The name refers to John James Audubon, the previous landowner.	
The Cortez	625 West 156th Street 40.8342°N 73.9468°W	Neville & Bagge	George R. Bagge Construction Co.	1909	An eight-story Beaux Arts building with a limestone base, red-brick upper facade, and terracotta decorations. Unlike the other buildings in the district, it is T-shaped, with light courts to the west and east, behind the front elevation. It was originally composed of two apartments per floor, each with about 9 rooms. (Note: Matthew Spady cites the building as having had one 8-room and one 9-room apartment per floor, while other sources say all the apartments had nine rooms.) These have been subdivided into four units on each floor. The building was likely named for the conquistador Hernán Cortés, though the building's name is spelled differently.	
The Cragmoor	801 Riverside Drive 40.8351°N 73.9469°W	George F. Pelham	North River Building Corp.	1926	A six-story, V-shaped Arts and Crafts building with a brown-brick facade and limestone and terracotta decorations. There is a main entrance courtyard at the center of the "V", along with rear light courts. Due to the topography, the Cragmoor also has a basement entrance. The Cragmoor was built with 48 suites (eight per floor), each with 3–5 rooms. Few of the apartments have been subdivided. The name is a generic British-inspired name.	
Crillon Court	779 Riverside Drive 40.8352°N 73.9475°W	Sidney H. Kitzler	Dark Hill Construction Co.	1926	A six-story, U-shaped Arts and Crafts building building with a brick facade and terracotta decorations. Because the building sits on a curve, it has an irregularly shaped courtyard. Crillon Court was built with 90 units, each with 3–6 rooms, in addition to a garage in the basement. Few of the apartments have been subdivided. The building was likely named for the Hôtel de Crillon in Paris.	
The Goya	611 West 156th Street 40.8341°N 73.9465°W	Denby & Nute	James O'Brien	1910	A six-story Renaissance Revival building with a brown-brick-and-limestone facade and terracotta decorations. The square floor plan has an interior courtyard. As built, the Goya had 29 units surrounding the courtyard, each with 4–8 rooms. These were later subdivided into smaller units. The building was likely named for the Spanish artist Francisco Goya.	
The Grinnell / The Grace [formerly]	800 Riverside Drive (@ 157th St. & Morgan Pl.) 40.8348°N 73.9460°W	Schwartz & Gross	Centre Realty Corp.	1911	A structure occupying an entire triangular block, designed in the Renaissance Revival and Mission styles. It is mostly eight stories, but the western corner is nine stories because of the sloping topography. The facades are made of brick with terracotta decorations, and there is an internal courtyard. The building retains its original 83 apartments, which include apartments with 5–9 rooms each; the larger apartments have separate servant entrances, and all major rooms have natural light exposure. It has two or three duplex apartments. The Grinnell is named for a previous property owner, the Grinnell family.	
Hispania Hall	601 West 156th Street (@ Broadway) 40.8338°N 73.9458°W	George F. Pelham	Fleischmann Brothers Corp.	1909	A six-story, Renaissance Revival building with a brick, limestone, and terracotta facade and an interior light court. Because the building sits both on a curve and at a corner, it has an irregularly shaped floor plan. The fire escapes are recessed into the facade due to a restrictive covenant. Hispania Hall was originally divided into 47 suites, each with 4–9 rooms. The larger units have since been subdivided, creating 71 units. The name refers to the Hispanic Society of America at Audubon Terrace.	
Hortense Arms	602 West 157th Street 40.8344°N 73.9461°W	Neville & Bagge	Sarah Harris	1909	A six-story, Renaissance Revival building with a brick and granite facade, characterized by historian Matthew Spady as Palladian-style. The building surrounds an interior light court. Hortense Arms originally had five apartments per floor, each with 5–8 rooms, though these have since been subdivided. The name is a generic British-inspired name.	
The Kannawah / The Kan-a-Wah / Kannawah Court	614 West 157th Street 40.8345°N 73.9465°W	Joseph C. Cocker	Kuhn & Lawson	1909	A six-story, U-shaped Medieval Revival building with a buff brick facade and terracotta decorations. The Kannawah retains its original 42 apartments (seven per floor) with little subdivision; each unit has 3–6 rooms. The name, likely inspired by West Virginia's Kanawha River, derives from that region's Iroquoian dialects.	
The Rhinecliff / The Rhinecleff / Rhinecliff Court / Rhinecleff Court	788 Riverside Drive 40.8342°N 73.9475°W	Schwartz & Gross	Willie Construction Co.	1914	An eleven-story, H-shaped Beaux-Arts building with a granite-and-limestone base, brick upper facade, and terracotta decorations. It originally had both smaller apartments with 4–6 rooms and larger duplex units with 7–9 rooms, including two first-floor duplexes with their own entrances on the street. The larger units have since been subdivided. The building was likely named for Rhinecliff, a popular 19th-century summer retreat in New York's Hudson Valley.	
The Rio Rita	807 Riverside Drive (@ 158th St.) 40.8354°N 73.9466°W	George F. Pelham	Enesbe Realty Corp.	1924	A six-story, H-shaped Mediterranean Revival building with a red-brick facade, terracotta decorations, and a Mission-style roof. Because of its location near (but not at) the intersection of Riverside Drive and 158th Street, the building has an irregular, sawtooth-shaped setback on its eastern elevation. The sloped topography necessitated the asymmetrical H-shaped plan, with a forecourt on the eastern elevation (adjoining the duplex at 809–811 Riverside Drive). The Rio Rita was constructed with 52 apartments, each with 3–6 rooms, in addition to a large ballroom. It has undergone little subdivision over the years. The building was originally known only by its address; the Rio Rita name, dating from the 1930s, was likely derived from the Panamanian town of Río Rita and the 1927 musical of the same name.	
The Riviera	790 Riverside Drive 40.8345°N 73.9471°W	Rouse & Goldstone	Willie Construction Co.	1911	A thirteen-story, H-shaped Beaux-Arts building with a brick and limestone facade and terracotta decorations. Courtyards separate the building irregularly into four wings facing Riverside Drive and 156th and 157th streets. It was originally split into about 150 apartments of 4–10 rooms each; the rooms are arranged so that they all have natural light exposure. The larger units were later subdivided, increasing the total to more than 200 units, each with 2–6 rooms. The building was likely named for the French Riviera.	
The Sutherland	611 West 158th Street (@ Riverside Dr.) 40.8353°N 73.9451°W	Emery Roth or Neville & Bagge (Note: Sources disagree on whether the Sutherland was designed by Emery Roth or Neville & Bagge.)	Brown Bros. Inc.	1910	A nine-story, I-shaped Beaux-Arts building with limestone and orange brick facade and terracotta decorations. Above is a copper dome and mansard roof. The building originally had three or four apartments per floor, each with 4–9 rooms, but these have since been subdivided. The name is a generic British-inspired name and may come from Sutherland ("southern land") in Scotland. This building is only part of the LPC listing and is excluded from the NRHP district.	
The Vauxhall / Vaux Hall	780 Riverside Drive 40.8338°N 73.9478°W	George and Edward Blum	Strathcona Construction Co.	1914	An eleven-story Arts and Crafts building with a brick-and-limestone facade and terracotta decorations. Courtyards separate the building irregularly into three wings facing Riverside Drive and 155th Street. It was originally split into apartments of 4–7 rooms each, but later subdivided into smaller units. The building was likely named for Vauxhall Gardens in London.	
The Velasquez	605 West 156th Street 40.8340°N 73.9461°W	Denby & Nute	James O'Brien	1910	A six-story Renaissance Revival building with a brown-brick-and-limestone facade and terracotta decorations. The square floor plan has an interior courtyard. As built, the Velasquez had 29 units surrounding the courtyard, each with 4–8 rooms. These were later subdivided into smaller units. The building was likely named for the Spanish artist Diego Velázquez, albeit with a different spelling.	

Just outside the historic district is River Terrace, a 16-story housing cooperative. Designed by Samuel Paul and Seymour Jarmul, River Terrace is located on the south side of 158th Street, east of the Riverside Drive West viaduct, and has 431 apartments and a garage. There is also a 17-story apartment building at 636 West 158th Street, which includes 120 apartments, a yard, garage, and community areas. and an apartment building was built on the site. 636 West 158th Street sits on the site of six demolished rowhouses.

=== Other structures ===
On the north side of Riverside Drive, at the southwestern corner with 158th Street, is a Georgian or Mediterranean Revival building with two adjacent duplex residences at 809 and 811 Riverside Drive (40.8352°N 73.9461°W). Designed by Fred W. Moore and Frank L. Landsiedel for developer Nathan Berler, it was intended as a model for other duplexes in the district, which were ultimately never built. Each family's residence is two stories high in the front on Riverside Drive, and three stories high in the rear on 158th Street, since the land slopes down to the rear. The building has a symmetrical brick facade with limestone decorations. There are protruding wings on either end, which contain sunrooms for each residence. When the house was built, The New York Times called it "one of the finest and most picturesque homes in the vicinity".

The NRHP designation originally included 12 rowhouses at 626–648 West 158th Street (40.8356°N 73.9470°W), on the south sidewalk west of Riverside Drive. All were designed by John P. Leo in 1896–1897. The easternmost four houses were developed by John G. R. Lilliendahl, and the western eight were developed by Isabelle Leo. The rowhouses are three stories high, with limestone cladding in their basements and brick above; due to the site's slope, the houses have an irregular roofline that slopes down as one heads west. With one exception, these buildings are designed in the Beaux-Arts, Renaissance Revival, and Romanesque Revival styles, and measure three bays wide. The westernmost house at number 648, a now-demolished Colonial Revival design, was only two bays wide and had a more elaborate Palladian window. These houses' designs were influenced by a restrictive covenant formalized by the previous landowner, which required Leo to set the houses back from the street, and which limited the sites to one- and two-family housing. The six westernmost houses were demolished in 2024; the remaining houses are the oldest extant buildings in the surrounding section of Washington Heights.

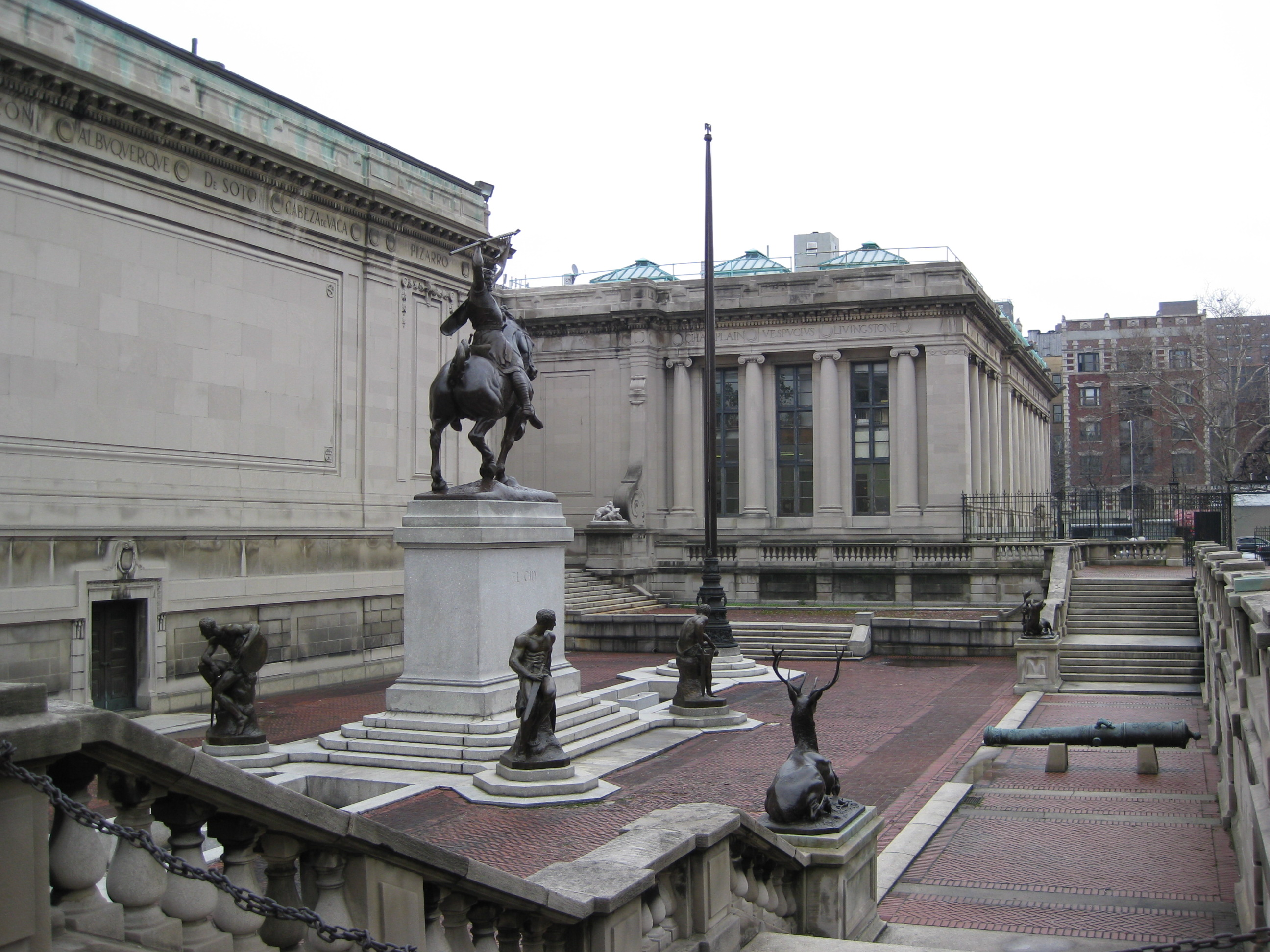
Audubon Terrace, which is part of the NRHP designation

On the south side of 156th Street is Audubon Terrace (40.8335°N 73.9466°W), a cultural complex occupying most of the west side of Broadway between 155th and 156th streets. The complex occupies a 200-by-550-foot (61 by 168 m) site with eight building sites, four each on 155th and 156th streets, surrounding a central plaza. Audubon Terrace was developed by the magnate and philanthropist Archer Milton Huntington between 1904 and 1930. His cousin Charles Pratt Huntington designed the master plan and many of the initial structures before his death in 1919, and William M. Kendall, Cass Gilbert, and H. Brooks Price finished the remaining buildings. Audubon Terrace was designated by the LPC as its own city historic district in 1979, and it is also listed as a NRHP historic district, which overlaps with the Audubon Park NRHP designation in its entirety.

== History ==
=== Early land use ===
==== Precolonial history to mid-18th century ====
Before European colonization of modern-day New York City, Upper Manhattan was inhabited by the Wecquaesgeek, an indigenous Munsee people. Audubon Park's site, known by its indigenous occupants as Penadnic, was filled with birch forests and Manhattan schist outcroppings. A creek, supplied by a spring at the top of a hill, flowed through the site to the Hudson River. The land was too rocky for permanent habitation but was used as a hunting ground. In the 17th century, with Dutch colonization of New Amsterdam and later English colonization of New York, the site of Audubon Park became part of Harlem Heights, in the northern section of Nieuw Haarlem (later Harlem). The Wecquaesgeek retained a presence there until 1715, although the site of Audubon Park was given to the colonist Jan Dyckman in 1691.

Dyckman's land was subdivided in 1766 or 1767. The northern part was sold to merchant John Watkins, and the southern part was sold to his close family member, (Note: Sources disagree on whether Maunsell was Watkins's uncle or brother-in-law.) British Army Colonel John Maunsell. During the American Revolutionary War, there was an artillery battery at Audubon Park. Harlem Heights—known alternately as Fort Washington, Washington Heights, and Carmansville during the 19th century (Note: The Washington Heights name was later applied to the broader neighborhood extending between 155th Street in the south and Dyckman Street in the north. The Carmansville name is no longer used. In this article, the former Harlem Heights region is referred to as "Carmansville".)—remained sparsely populated. When Manhattan's street grid was laid out during the Commissioners' Plan of 1811, the northern edge of the grid was placed at 155th Street, which ran through Watkins's estate. In 1815, Watkins's daughter Elizabeth Dunkin inherited a 47-acre (19 ha) tract that included the future Audubon Park, and Dunkin's brother Samuel Watkins inherited a tract of similar size to the north. Dunkin and Samuel Watkins rented their land out. Real-estate speculator James Conner, who bought Dunkin's entire tract in 1835, sold a partial stake to another speculator, Richard Carman. Conner and Carman lost their land to foreclosure in 1838, when the New York Bowery Fire Insurance Company took over.

==== Audubon estate ====
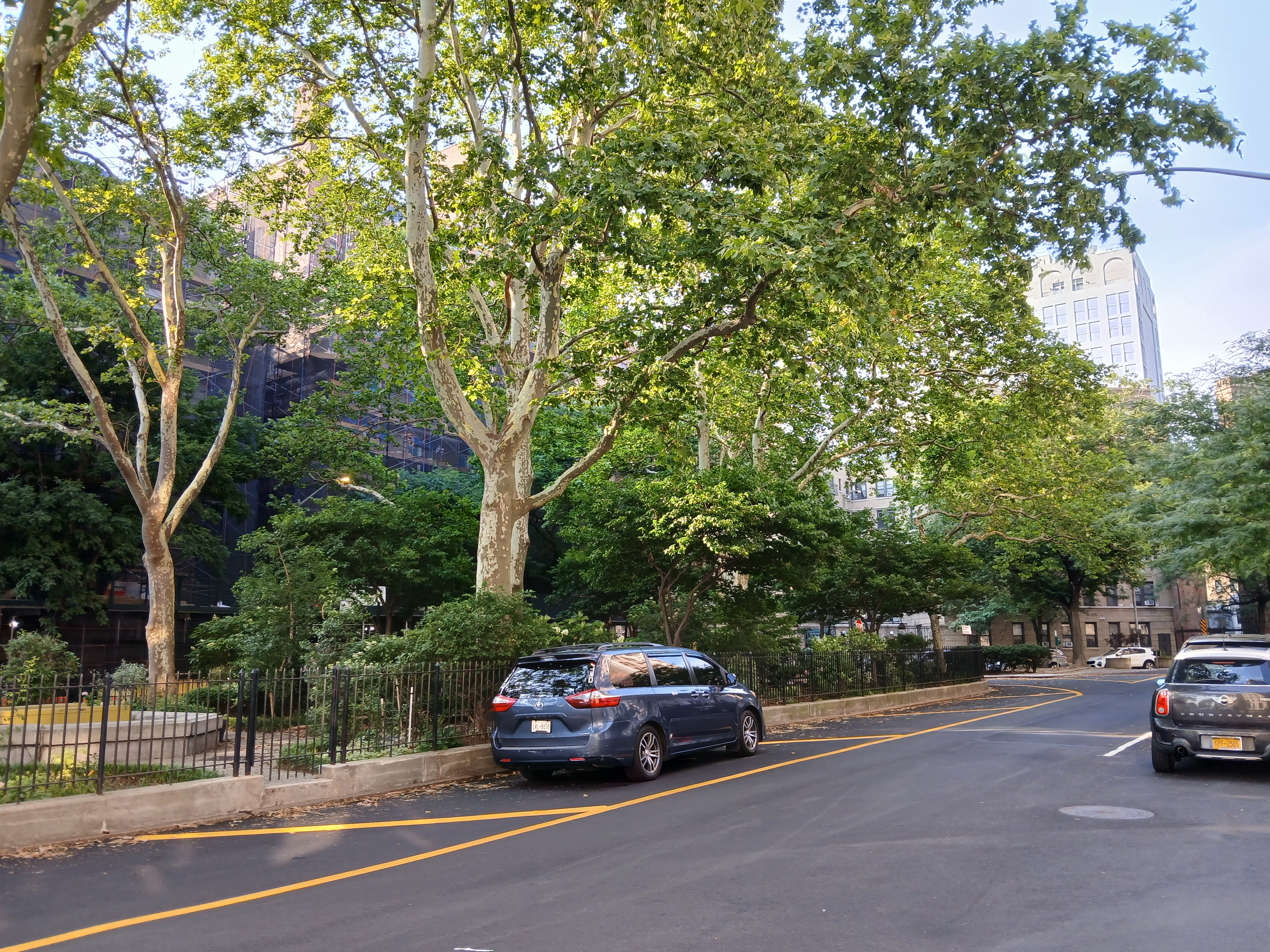
Modern view of Riverside Drive at 156th Street, near the location of the Audubon House

The next owner was the naturalist and artist John James Audubon, who bought 14 acres (5.7 ha) in 1841 for $4,938 (equivalent to $154,113 in 2025). He wanted to be rid of the "hot bricks and pestilential vapors" that he believed were plaguing New York City, and there were bears, moose, deer, elk, foxes, wolves, and other wildlife on the site. The estate became known as Minniesland, after Audubon's wife Lucy, whom her sons called "Minnie" (a Scottish term for mother). Lucy held the title to the property, which allowed Audubon to prevent debt collectors from seizing Minniesland if he went bankrupt. The Audubons bought more land from the Watkins family in 1843, creating a rectangular plot of about 21 acres (8.5 ha). These purchases were funded by profits from the sale of Audubon's book Quadrupeds of North America.

Audubon built a two- or three-story (Note: Sources give conflicting figures of two or three stories.) clapboard house at Minniesland, with porches on two sides and a view of the Hudson River. The Audubon House, designed in the Greek Revival style, was probably located near 156th Street, about 20 feet (6.1 m) above the waterline. A grove with 200 trees surrounded the house, and there was a beach along the Hudson River shoreline, in addition to a pond fed by the brook from 158th Street. Audubon initially spent little time at Minniesland because he was away on expeditions, It was from Minniesland where Audubon received the first telegraph message ever sent to Manhattan. When the Hudson River Railroad (later the West Side Line) was laid through Carmansville in 1846, Audubon attempted without avail to prevent its construction. The tracks passed within 50 feet (15 m) of the Audubon House, turning an inlet on the estate into a pond, and the line had a station at 152nd Street, just south of the estate. The New-York Tribune retrospectively called Minniesland "one of the show places along the easterly bank of the Hudson River", which attracted visitors during weekends.

By the late 1840s, Audubon's declining health prevented him from traveling. His son Victor had invested the family fortune into unprofitable speculative real-estate ventures. To cover his financial losses, Victor first mortgaged part of Minniesland to a neighbor, then decided to subdivide and sell off the land. By then, the railroad's construction had increased real estate developers' interest in Upper Manhattan, and families in more developed parts of New York City families were seeking areas with a more rural character, such as Carmansville. In January 1851, Audubon died at his estate, and he was buried in neighboring Trinity Church Cemetery after a funeral at his house. A planned auction for the estate, scheduled for later that year, did not occur.

=== 19th-century residential subdivision ===
==== 1850s and 1860s: Development ====
The first part of Minniesland was sold a month after Audubon's funeral. The developer Dennis Harris bought a 5-acre (2.0 ha) site from Lucy Audubon; he then built a refinery at 160th Street and a ferry pier at 158th Street. Harris subdivided his property and resold the resulting lots, imposing a restrictive covenant preventing industrial development or liquor stores. In late 1852, Lucy resold additional property to Harris and to his brother William, subject to restrictive covenants. Lucy sold much of her remaining land to her sons John and Victor, who built their own houses on the river so Lucy could alternate living with each son. This allowed Lucy to rent out her own property. John sold some property to his onetime collaborators Karl Gildemeister and Louis Nagel and to merchant Wellington Clapp, who built their own houses there. An existing stable was converted to a house and leased to financial advisor James Hall, a family friend. Victor also built a rental house. By late 1853, John and Victor had finished their own residences. The historian Matthew Spady wrote that Minniesland had become Manhattan's first railroad suburb; due to Manhattan's increasing development, it was the island's only ever such suburb.

The new residents called the suburb "Audubon Park", though the "Minniesland" name remained in common use until the Audubon Park name was formalized in 1860. Audubon Park's early occupants variously listed themselves as being in the larger Carmansville–Fort Washington–Washington Heights neighborhood or by street address only. The first written mention of the Audubon Park name was in The New York Times in 1854. By the mid-1850s, Carmansville had dozens of businesses, eight hotels, two schools, two event venues, and four churches. Among them was a school that Lucy operated for Audubon Park's children. The district had also gained its first tenement building at 157th Street. The suburb's more prominent early residents included George Blake Grinnell, a stockbroker and financier who, with his family, had moved to Audubon Park in 1857. Grinnell's family became Audubon Park's single largest landowner over the next three decades. The Audubon family were themselves running low on funds, prompting them to republish some of Audubon's work in the late 1850s.

By 1860, Audubon Park included 14 wood-framed residences nestled among the forests, accessed by winding driveways. Many of these houses were rented out to well-off individuals, while others were occupied by their developers. That year, the New York State Legislature passed a law authorizing the extension of the street grid north of 155th Street, into Audubon Park. By that decade, census records showed 13 families within Audubon Park, and ten families (including Lucy Audubon) were listed as property owners. Both the Audubon sons were dead by 1862, while Lucy, who lived until 1874, sold her own home and moved out. With no progress on the new street grid, in 1865, the Central Park Commission (led by Andrew Haswell Green) was tasked with extending the grid northward. Green's commission called for the construction of the Grand Boulevard (later Broadway) and Riverside Drive, though the latter would take decades to build. By 1869, Frederick Clarke Withers had built a brick stable in Audubon Park, the district's first brick building, for Grinnell's family.

==== 1870s to 1890s ====
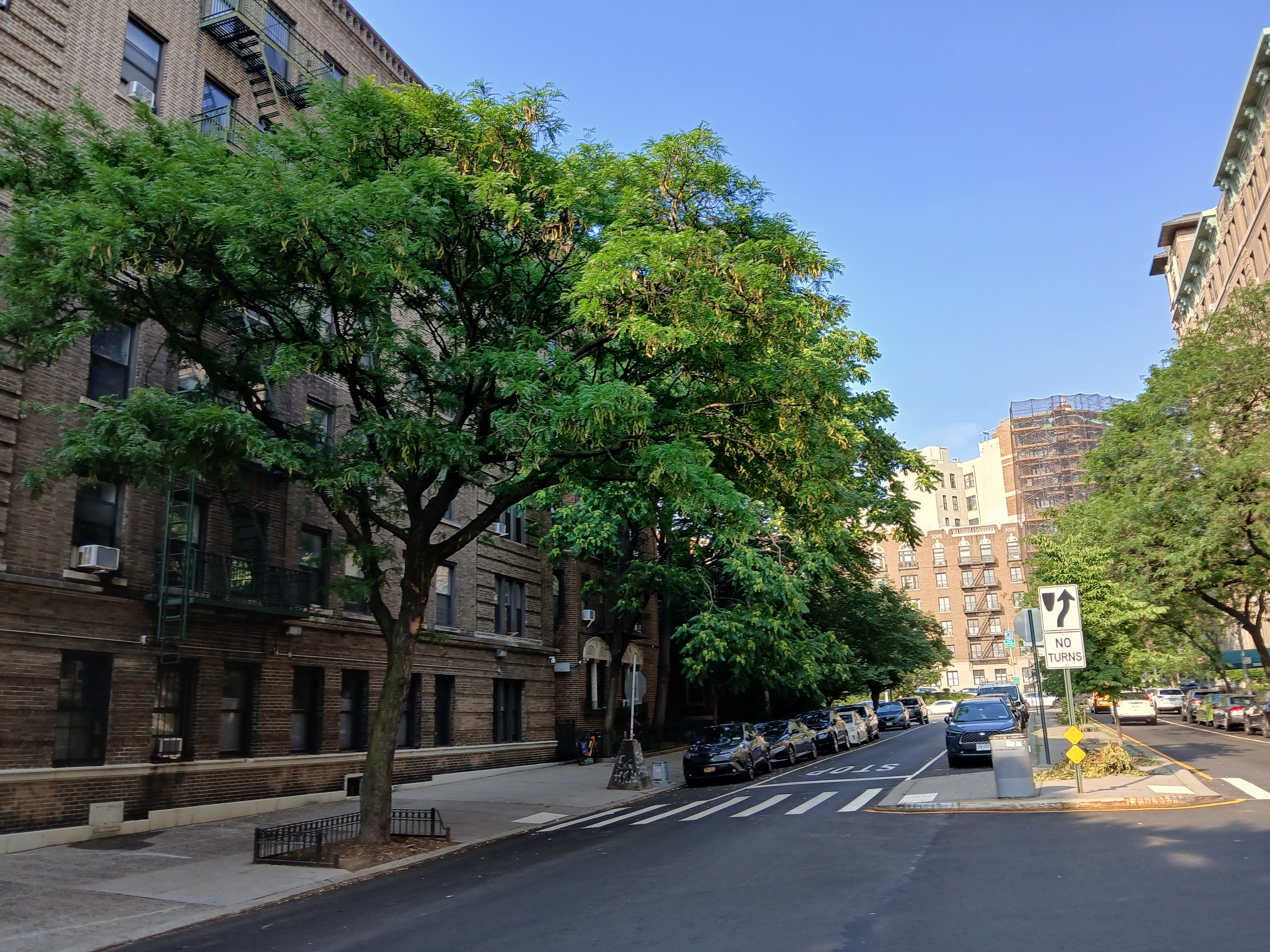
View northward from Riverside Drive at 157th Street

The Grand Boulevard, a tree-lined avenue with planted medians, opened for public use in 1872. It provided a quicker route to Lower Manhattan, as residents previously had to detour around Trinity Church Cemetery to 10th (now Amsterdam) Avenue, but it did not immediately spur development in Carmansville or Audubon Park. At the time, there were also plans for an elevated railway line and a new building for the Church of the Intercession in Audubon Park. Both plans, along with a proposed extension of Riverside Drive, were scuttled during the Panic of 1873 due to funding shortages, and no properties in Audubon Park were sold between 1873 and 1880. Victor's widow Georgianna was the last Audubon family member to live in Audubon Park, moving out during 1878. The Sixth Avenue elevated line eventually opened a station at 155th Street and Eighth Avenue in 1879, allowing residents of the area to reach Lower Manhattan in 45 minutes. Even though steep topography made the station difficult to reach from Audubon Park, it was the first of several urban developments to be built near the district. The late 1870s and early 1880s also saw the formal completion of 155th Street, 158th Street, and Broadway within Audubon Park.

By the 1880 United States census, Audubon Park had 139 residents; during that decade, the area was known colloquially as "the Park". George Blake Grinnell's parcel had been subdivided among his children, who built houses there. These houses, located on 157th Street west of 11th Avenue (now Broadway), were among several built in Audubon Park during that decade. George Blake's son George Bird Grinnell was a conservationist who, while not one of the beneficiaries of the subdivision, was buying up land for development at the edges of Audubon Park. By then, the Grinnell family owned the majority of Audubon Park. The other residents at the time included the Wheelock, Foster, and Stone families. The Real Estate Record wrote in 1887 that there were about 20 residences and that the district's land, owned jointly by its residents, had no dividing fences. By then, 155th and 158th streets had been established as Audubon Park's southern and northern boundaries, and the district remained little developed because of the steep topography at its periphery. Near the end of the decade, a streetcar line was built on 10th Avenue, further increasing access to Lower Manhattan.

Planning was underway for a northward extension of Riverside Drive and the construction of the New York City Subway's first line by the mid-1890s. The Boulevard Lafayette opened in 1895; this, along with the Riverside Drive extension and subway, prompted extensive real-estate speculation in Audubon Park. Development during this era was influenced by a fire code implemented in 1892, which required that all buildings on Manhattan's West Side south of 165th Street be built of fireproof material. Architect August Cordes, who had bought some land from longtime resident Shepherd Knapp, resold it in 1896 to John P. Leo, who developed eight houses at 634–648 West 158th Street. The houses were completed in 1897, and Leo's partner John G. R. Lilliendahl built four more houses to the east (numbers 626–632) the next year; these were Audubon Park's first buildings under the new fire code. Six more houses were quickly built to the south, but no further rowhouse construction occurred afterward. In 1897, the New-York Tribune wrote that Audubon Park was "dotted irregularly with villas of all sizes", which were endangered by the pending extension of Riverside Drive. Construction of a subway tunnel under Broadway, at Audubon Park's eastern edge, began in 1900.

=== Early-20th-century redevelopment ===
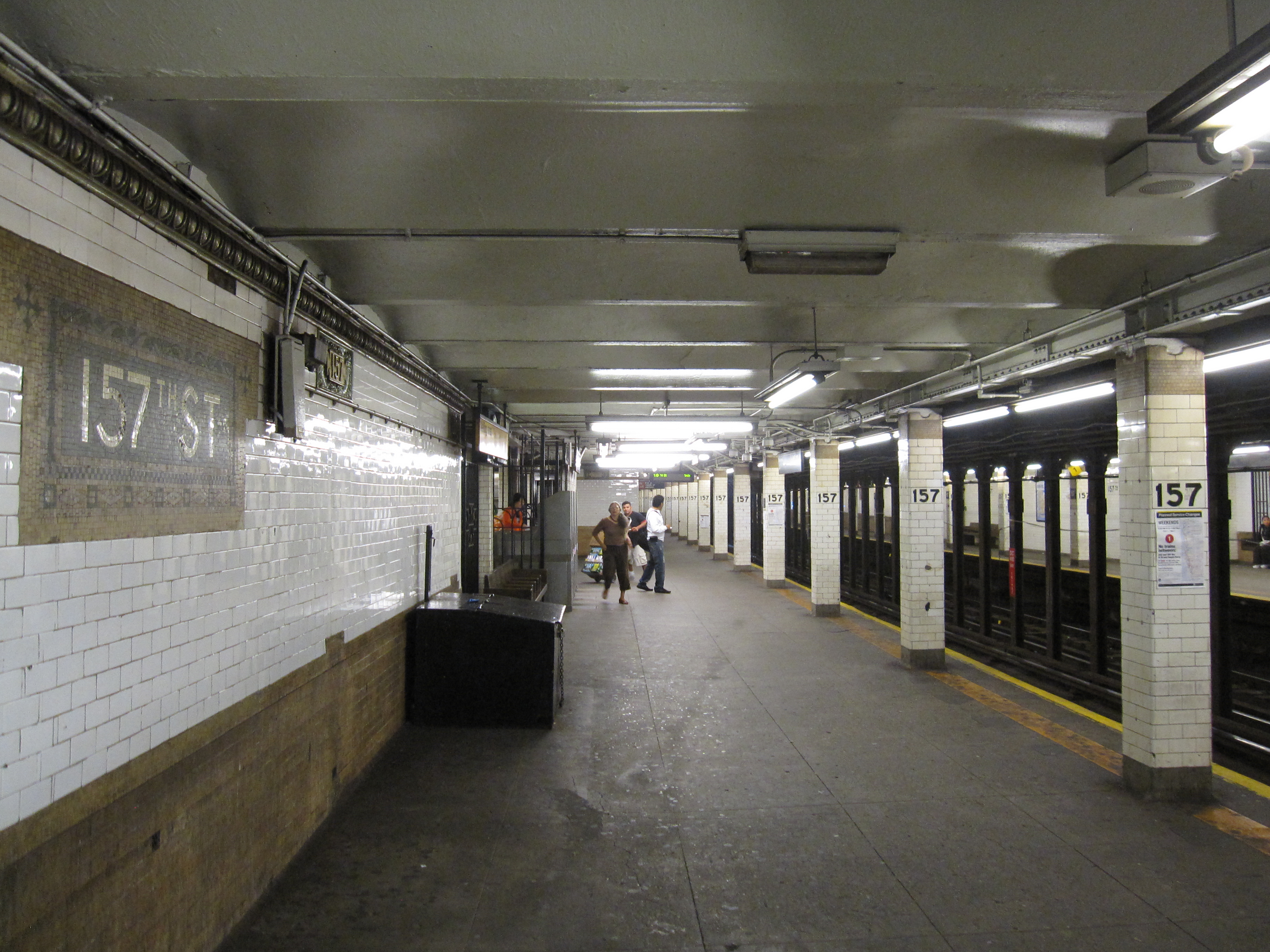
The opening of the 157th Street station stimulated growth in Audubon Park.

Upon the 1900 United States census, Audubon Park had 220 residents. Most of the district's residents rented their properties, except for nine rowhouse owners and George Bird Grinnell. Only one building remained from the original Minniesland estate. With the extension of Riverside Drive underway, the Grinnells successfully convinced the city to route the avenue inland between 155th and 161st streets, thereby giving the family the Riverside Drive frontage they coveted. These plans also allowed the completion of 156th and 157th streets west of Broadway, which had been stymied by the steep terrain, and these streets formally opened in 1903. The avenue's construction involved erecting a retaining wall, isolating the houses on the waterfront (including Audubon's old home) from the rest of Audubon Park. By 1904, land was being cleared for the Riverside Drive extension.

Meanwhile, the 157th Street station opened that November as part of the first subway line. There had been an unsuccessful proposal during the station's construction to name it for Audubon Park, but the station's opening nonetheless led to an influx of development in Audubon Park. The district's urbanization was concurrent with the rapid growth of Upper Manhattan north of 125th Street, which grew nearly threefold from 1905 to 1920. The Washington Post wrote in 1904 that Audubon Park was "one of the most beautiful spots in all the island", citing the mansions and large trees, and The New York Times wrote that, with the completion of 156th and 157th streets, "the charms of this semi-rural residential spot ceased to exist". Historian Reginald Pelham Bolton, who lived in one of the 158th Street rowhouses, unsuccessfully lobbied the local Washington Heights Taxpayers' Association (WHTA) to preserve the Audubon House. He did convince three neighbors to buy up adjacent land, which he envisaged could be used as a park.

==== 1900s ====
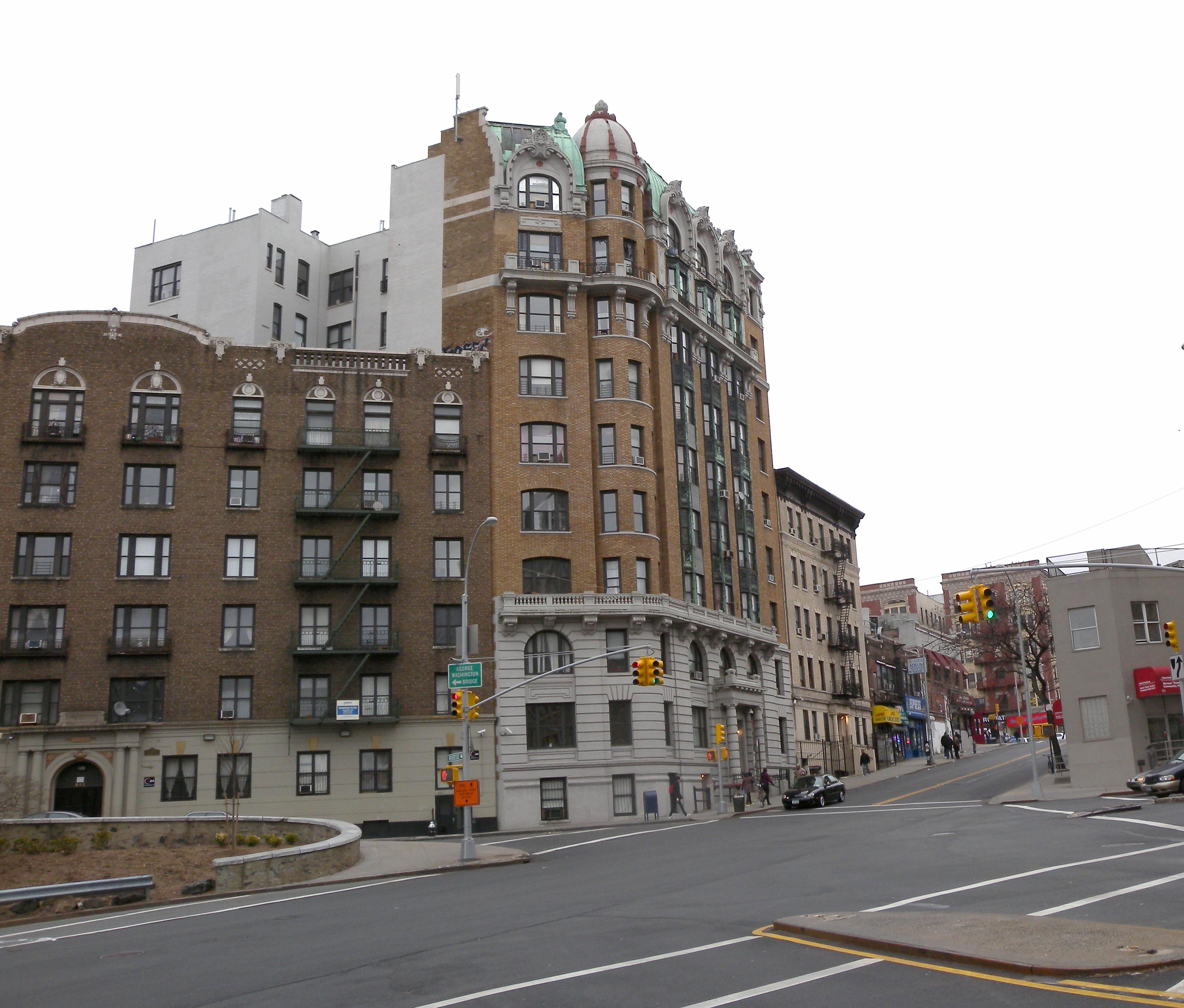
The first building completed in the district was 609 West 158th Street (background right), next to 611 West 158th Street (center). Both are part of the LPC district, not the NRHP district.

In 1899, the Grinnell family formed the Lansing Investment (or Improvement) Company, which bought some of the family's land. By 1903, an office building was being constructed at Broadway and 157th Street, breaking a longstanding informal prohibition on commercial development near Audubon Park. Apartments were being developed in the surrounding neighborhood, such as 609 West 158th Street (at the edge of the Audubon Park estate), completed in 1905. The Grinnell family still owned much of Audubon Park at that point; the family had not developed buildings on their own land, and only two of the district's sites had been sold to speculative developers. Consequently, the area around the 157th Street station was still largely undeveloped when the subway opened, whereas speculative development around other stations had preceded the subway's opening. The Lansing Company also sold some land on 155th and 156th streets in 1904 to Archer Milton Huntington, who built the first Audubon Terrace buildings there. Huntington's mother Arabella Huntington acquired additional property at the eastern end of that block in 1907, but the Huntingtons made no attempt to acquire the western end of the block.

A real-estate partnership, the Audubon Park Syndicate, bought the Grinnell family's remaining holdings in Audubon Park in November 1908, and Grinnell's family subsequently moved out. Ten apartment buildings were eventually built on the Audubon Park Syndicate properties, covering over 80 lots. Within a month of its acquisition, the syndicate had resold the lots west of Broadway between 156th and 157th streets to the Fleischmann Brothers Company. In early 1909, the syndicate sold land between 155th and 156th streets to Huntington for the expansion of Audubon Terrace. In May 1909 alone, the syndicate sold the southeast corner of Riverside Drive and 156th Street to the Wille Construction Company, the site immediately to the north (between 156th and 157th streets) to the Riviera Construction Company, and the triangular block immediately north of 157th Street to the Centre Realty Company. The same year, the Audubon Park Syndicate sold a plot on the north side of 156th Street. Separately, Arnold Schramm resold the northeast corner of Riverside Drive and 158th Street that August; this plot, just outside the original Audubon Park, became the Sutherland, an apartment building at 611 West 158th Street.

By late 1909, eight buildings on the syndicate property, plus the Sutherland, were in various stages of development; three of these buildings had been completed. Among the completed buildings were the Fleischmann Brothers' Audubon and Hispania halls on Broadway between 156th and 157th street; they immediately resold Audubon Hall while retaining Hispania Hall. At the western end of the same block, the Riviera Construction Company was developing the Riviera, which at 13 stories was to be the district's tallest building. Five other apartment buildings were also built in the middle of that block, each with six or eight stories, including the Hortense developed by Sarah Harris and the Goya and Velasquez developed by James O'Brien. The Lansing Company had filed plans for several structures in the district, including on the east side of Riverside Drive, though not all the Riverside Drive buildings were immediately built. Audubon Terrace was being expanded as well, and additional apartment buildings were being developed just outside the district.

==== 1910s ====
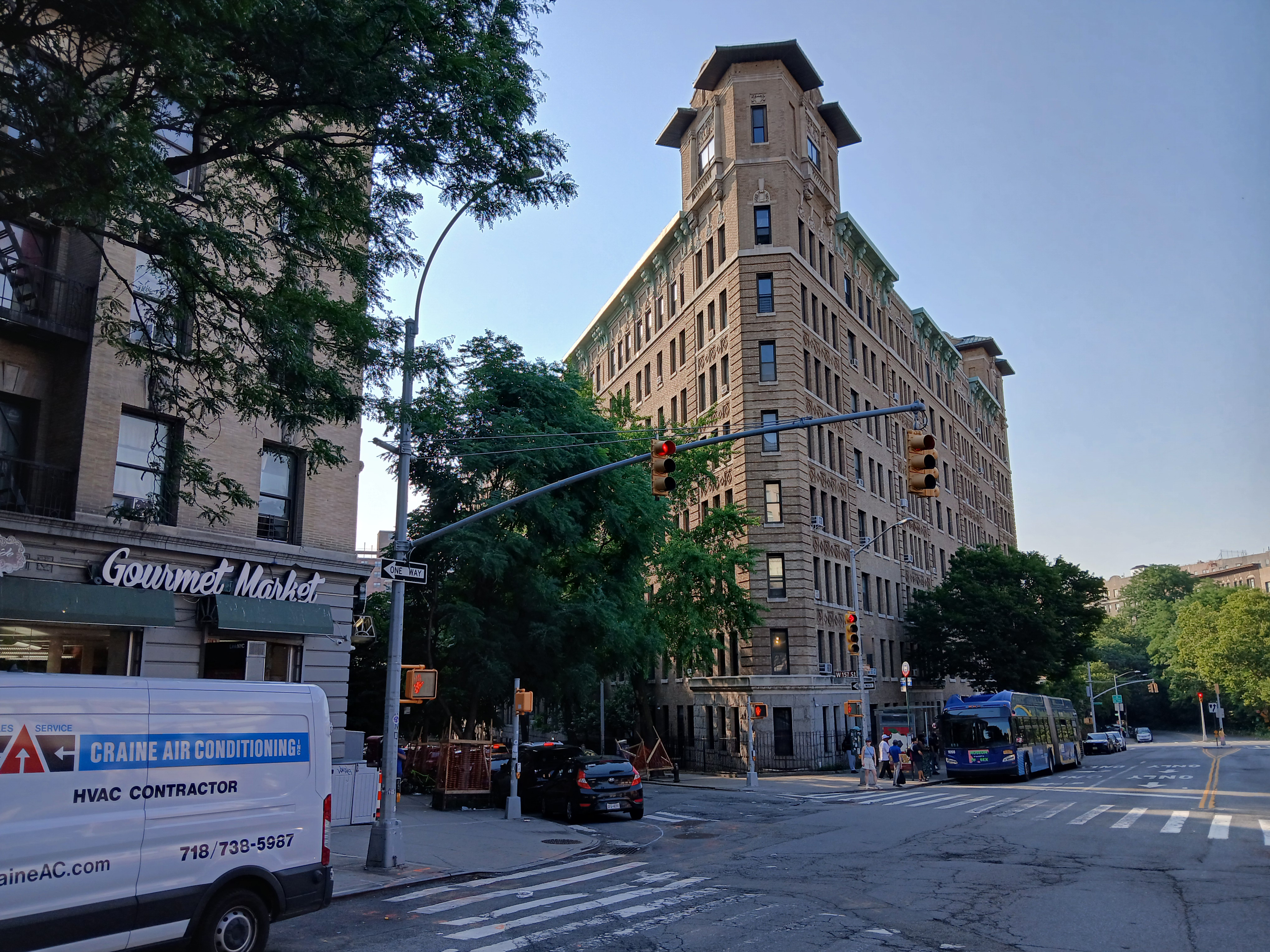
The Grinnell, completed in 1911

By 1910, developers had spent $15 million on apartment developments in the district. The Sutherland was completed that year. The Riviera was also finished, becoming the city's third-largest apartment building behind the Belnord and the Apthorp; though the builders believed its 13-story height would deter residents, the Riviera quickly became fully occupied. The Grinnell, on the triangular block north of 157th Street, was completed in 1911. That February also saw the extension of Riverside Drive from 145th to 158th Street. Also built were the Rhinecliff and the Vauxhall along Riverside Drive, both on the Audubon Terrace block. The Rhinecliff was built at 156th Street in 1911, and the Strathcona Construction Company bought the site immediately east of 155th Street in 1913. The Vauxhall, occupying the last entirely vacant site in Audubon Park east of Riverside Drive, was completed in 1914; it was quickly resold after being built. The scholar Robert Snyder wrote that the Audubon Park neighborhood had become fashionable, similar to the Central Park West buildings on the Upper West Side.

As early as 1913, meanwhile, there were plans to bypass the curved extension of Riverside Drive through Audubon Park. The five-pointed intersection of 158th Street, Riverside Drive, and Audubon Place was dangerous for traffic. Arnold W. Brunner and Frederick Law Olmsted proposed constructing either a viaduct or an embankment carrying a new street (Riverside Drive West) northward from 155th Street, bypassing the existing avenue and crossing over 158th Street. The road would run west of the Audubon House, cutting it off from the waterfront; upon hearing these plans, preservationists suggested that the viaduct run east of the house. Brunner and Olmsted rejected the preservationists' suggestion, which they felt would not adequately address the convoluted routing of Riverside Drive or allow the steep slope of 158th Street to be re-graded. The viaduct proposal was ultimately postponed several years, while residents continued to advocate for preserving the Audubon House within a park. Sheds and garages were constructed around the older buildings during the decade.

There was little remaining undeveloped land in Washington Heights south of 157th Street by the mid-1910s. Newer residents did not use the Audubon Park name, as they instead tended to identify the exact building or address where they lived. Upon New York's 1915 census, almost all the apartment buildings were fully occupied, and many residents were first- and second-generation Americans from Europe. Residents worked in a variety of fields, including law, medicine, banking, and sales. Because of the lack of street infrastructure west of Riverside Drive, the owners of the district's five remaining mid-19th-century houses continued to use the Audubon Park name; by then, these houses were in poor condition. Ownership of the rowhouses on 158th Street remained largely unchanged. The area west of Riverside Drive had still not been redeveloped in 1919, in part because of the difficult topography, and in part because the name "Audubon Park" gave the impression that the tract was a public park. That year, the Grinnell, Hispania Hall, the Riviera, and the Sutherland were all resold by their developers. The Grinnell estate sold two lots for the construction of the Cragmoor, which was completed in 1920, becoming the district's first apartment building west of Riverside Drive.

==== 1920s and early 1930s ====
With the growth of tenant syndicates in New York City during the 1920s, several Audubon Park apartment buildings became housing cooperatives owned by their residents. These included the Rhinecliff (which was quickly resold back to a private developer) and the Vauxhall. Buildings in the district were also resold to developers, such as Audubon Hall and one of the late-19th-century houses at 620 West 158th Street. Nathan Berler bought land at the corner of Riverside Drive and 158th Street in 1921, constructing a villa there. Henry Friedman and Morris White bought 26 lots on an adjacent parcel the same year, where Berler developed another apartment building at 807 Riverside Drive, completed in 1924. A third apartment building, 779 Riverside Drive, was completed in 1926.

Meanwhile, the Cragmoor's completion had startled the WHTA, which feared that further development would block sightlines and prevent the creation of a park around the Audubon House. The WHTA proposed a tunnel to carry traffic under Audubon Terrace, and the planned Riverside Drive West viaduct was temporarily shelved. In 1922, borough president Julius Miller revived plans for the viaduct, which would require the construction of several high retaining walls. The remaining undeveloped portion of Audubon Park, by then part of a hollow known as Garage Village, was to be raised. The Audubon House, while still intact, was a decrepit tenement, and Bolton wanted the house to be raised along with the land. The Riverside Drive West viaduct began construction in 1926 and was completed two years later. The archways under the new viaduct were sealed off; the three remaining houses in the hollow, including the Audubon House, were thus cut off from the waterfront.

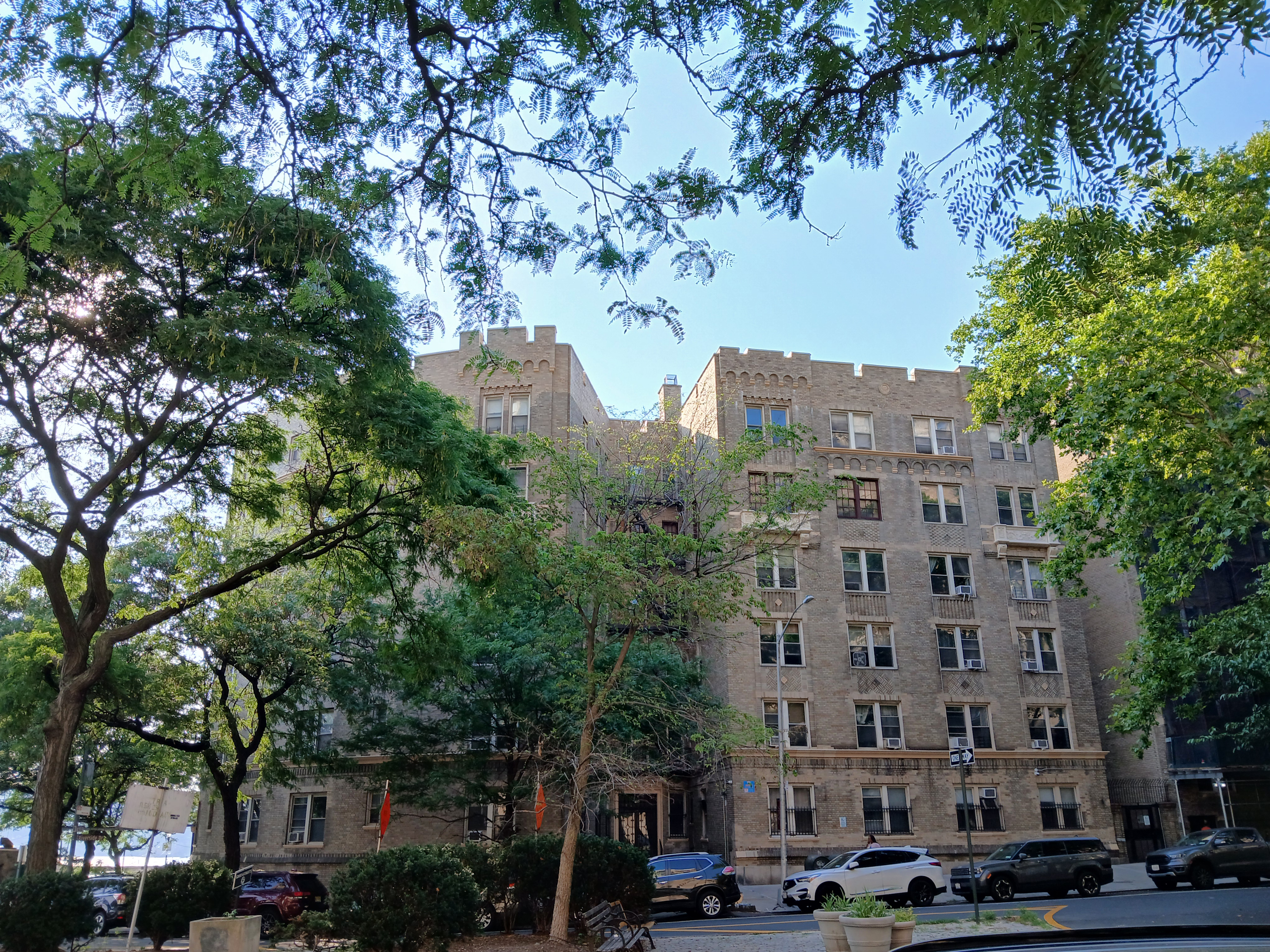
765 Riverside Drive, one of Audubon Park's final developments, was built on the site of the Audubon House.

In 1927, the firm of Brandt & Sons acquired additional land west of Riverside Drive for the construction of two apartment buildings. A third, the site of the Audubon House at the intersection of Riverside Drive and the viaduct, was delayed while debates over the house's fate continued. In January 1929, preservationists revived their efforts to have the Audubon House preserved as city parkland, and the New York City Board of Estimate directed the Manhattan borough president's office to prepare plans for such a park. Manhattan park commissioner Walter R. Herrick opposed the park's construction, considering the hollow unsuitable for park development. Despite Miller's support for the plans, a new Board of Estimate took office that November and voted against the proposal. The Brandts completed their first two buildings at 775 Riverside Drive and 156-08 Riverside Drive West, just north of the Audubon House, in 1930.

The Audubon House property was sold in September 1931 to the Brandts, which proposed an apartment building there. There were delays finalizing the sale, and Bolton organized a last-ditch effort to raise $25,000 for the house's relocation. Brandt agreed to allow the relocation if the house were removed before Brandt's takeover on December 1, but then requested that the WHTA put up a $50,000 bond ensuring the house's timely removal. Despite receiving some monetary donations and a site for the relocated house on 161st Street, the WHTA, unable to raise the requisite bond, dropped its opposition to the Audubon House's demolition. The Audubon House was disassembled in December 1931 and was moved to 161st Street. Although a committee was founded to raise funds for the house's reconstruction, this never happened amid the Great Depression, and the pieces of the house disappeared without a trace, having likely been taken by scavengers. The Brandts completed 765 Riverside Drive in 1932.

=== Later years ===
==== Mid-1930s to late 1940s ====
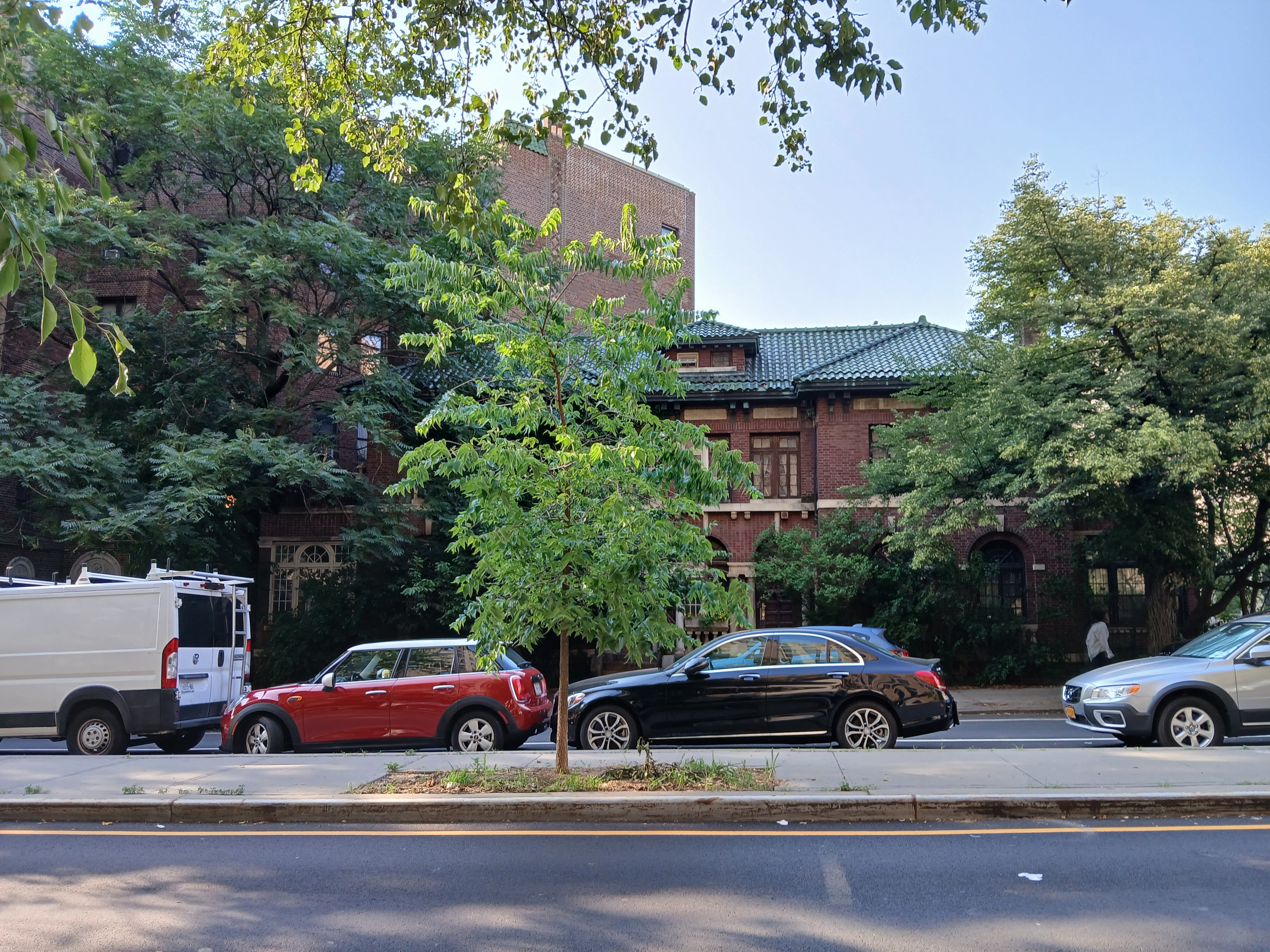
The duplex at Riverside Drive and 158th Street

The completion of 765 Riverside Drive erased most traces of the old Audubon Park estate, the only undeveloped land remaining was the garages at the district's northwest corner, near where Riverside Drive West passed over 158th Street. A seaplane terminal opened at the end of 155th Street beneath Riverside Drive in 1934, and 158th Street became an access point for the Henry Hudson Parkway in 1937. There remained few vestiges of Audubon's residency in Washington Heights, such as the names of Audubon Avenue and local businesses. The Audubon Park name was largely forgotten. The district never gained the cachet of upscale developments elsewhere on the West Side, in part because of the Great Depression, and residents were moving to the suburbs. As early as the 1930 United States census, the number of live-in servants in Audubon Park's buildings had declined dramatically from previous censuses, while large numbers of boarders had moved in.

The neighborhood's 1930s demographic shifts motivated property owners in Audubon Park to renovate their apartments. In some cases, these renovations entailed subdividing larger units, which were easier to rent out. The Riviera's largest suites were split up in 1938, and further subdivisions occurred at the Rhinecliff, the Vauxhall, and even the 158th Street rowhouses. The 1940 United States census still recorded many Europeans in Audubon Park, and sharp influxes of boarders. Audubon Park also had a small population of German Jews, who were much more widely concentrated in the rest of Washington Heights. Black residents, previously concentrated within Harlem, were increasingly moving farther north; by 1940, there were significant black populations as far north as 170th Street. Several buildings changed ownership in the 1940s, including the Vauxhall, 765 Riverside Drive, the Goya and Velasquez, and the Sutherland.

==== 1950s to 1990s ====
Several buildings changed ownership in the 1950s and 1960s, including the Riviera and the Rhinecliff. With the post–World War II outflux of white residents to the suburbs, black residents moved to Audubon Park. Many residents came from the Southern United States or from Harlem. Audubon Park's black residents, at first, lived mainly in the 158th Street houses, as some apartment buildings initially resisted racial integration. For example, the Grinnell was owned by black priest Daddy Grace but housed only one black resident, and dentist Stanley Nelson (the father of Stanley Nelson Jr.) had a door slammed in his face at the Vauxhall. In 1961, the city announced plans for River Terrace, a housing cooperative on the site of the former Garage Village. Work on River Terrace commenced in 1962, and it opened in 1964, with a significantly higher black population than the neighboring buildings.

Concurrently, statewide rent control measures instituted after World War II had reduced landlords' income. To reduce staffing costs, Audubon Park landlords added features such as self-service elevators, modern telephones, and mailboxes. Nonetheless, many buildings became dilapidated due to the diminishing rental income, and quality of life decreased, driving away the remaining white residents. Both petty and serious crime became commonplace, and Dominican Americans and other Latinos moved in. The buildings continued to fall into disrepair during the 1960s and 1970s. For example, after the Grinnell's landlord abandoned that building entirely in the 1970s, the city government took over. In another case, writer John Foreman bought the Hortense Arms in 1974, only to resell it the next year at a significant loss. At one building, the former Vauxhall at 780 Riverside Drive, a survey had found that six-sevenths of residents had been the victim of crime. 780 Riverside Drive's residents formed a tenant association to protect each other, and that building also hosted annual holiday parties, leading one writer to say that the building retained a "sense of neighborhood".

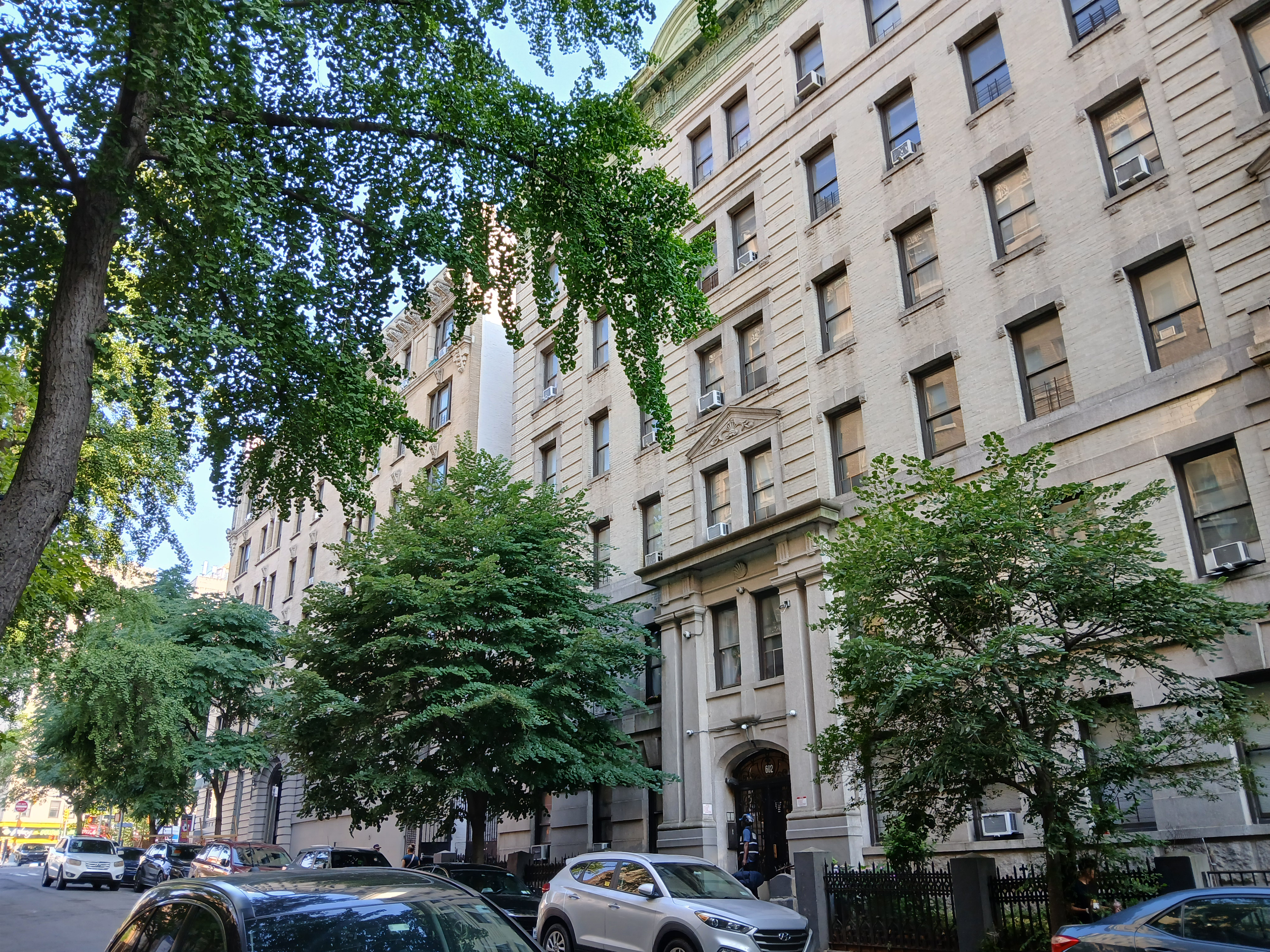
Until 1991, part of 157th Street in Audubon Park (pictured) was taken over by a drug gang.

By the late 1970s, the city's economy was no longer actively declining, and several of Audubon Park's buildings began participating in the Tenant Interim Lease program, a pilot program allowing low-income residents of city-owned buildings to eventually restructure their properties as co-ops. In the 1980s, some of the buildings became co-ops, including the Grinnell and the Riviera. The houses on 158th Street were well-maintained and were generally owned by middle-income black families, except the dilapidated houses at the western end, which were single room occupancy slums. There was still high levels of poverty and drug-related crimes in Audubon Park in the 1990s. The block of 157th Street between Riverside Drive and Morgan Place was taken over by a drug gang, who turned that block into what the Times called a "no-man's land" until the gang was disbanded in 1991. The area's state of disinvestment ended in the 1990s, when the creation of a new police precinct prompted investment in Washington Heights. By the late 1990s, The New York Times described Audubon Park as a co-op enclave where apartment prices ranged from $90,000 to $200,000 and were steadily rising.

==== 2000s to present ====
In the 2000s, as Washington Heights underwent gentrification, middle-income residents again began buying apartments in Audubon Park. These newer residents tended to participate in neighborhood groups and the co-op or condominium boards of their apartment buildings. Audubon Park's character contrasted with the areas east of Broadway, which were more heavily working-class and Latino. The New York City Landmarks Preservation Commission (LPC) agreed to consider Audubon Park for landmark designation in February 2009, amid significant support for such a designation. That July, the LPC designated 19 of Audubon Park's buildings as a city historic district. The district, along with Audubon Terrace, Audubon Avenue, and a local park and school, were among the few remaining places in Washington Heights named after Audubon. The houses on 158th Street were excluded from the LPC district, since the LPC deemed them stylistically incompatible with the apartment buildings. The local Manhattan Community Board 12 repeatedly passed resolutions requesting that the LPC add the 158th Street houses to the historic district. Local residents submitted their own petitions for the 158th Street houses, but the LPC rejected their request in 2016.

All except one of Audubon Park's apartment buildings had become condos or co-ops by 2015. The Grinnell was used as a filming location for shows such as Law & Order, Orange Is the New Black, and 666 Park Avenue. The attempts to add the 158th Street rowhouses to the LPC district ultimately failed, and in 2021, Artifact Real Estate Development filed permits to demolish six of the rowhouses for an apartment development. Audubon Park was nominated for inclusion on the National Register of Historic Places (NRHP) in June 2024, and much of the district was added to the NRHP that August. The houses, at 636–648 West 158th Street, were demolished the same year; the new apartment building at 636 West 158th Street was completed in 2026.

== Notable residents ==
Notable residents of Audubon Park have included:

- Henry Mills Alden, magazine editor; lived at the Goya
- Reginald Pelham Bolton, historian; lived at 638 West 158th Street
- George Sherman Carter, scientist; lived at 632 West 158th Street
- Alice Childress, actress; lived at the Grinnell
- Thelma Hill, dancer; lived at 156-08 Riverside Drive West
- Bennett Kilpack, actor; lived at 644 West 158th Street
- Daniel F. Tiemann, Mayor of New York City from 1858 to 1859; lived in Audubon Park in the 19th century

== See also ==
- List of New York City Designated Landmarks in Manhattan above 110th Street
- National Register of Historic Places listings in Manhattan above 110th Street
