= Audubon Avenue =

Avenue in Manhattan, New York

Coordinates: 40°50.90′0″N 73°55.96′0″W

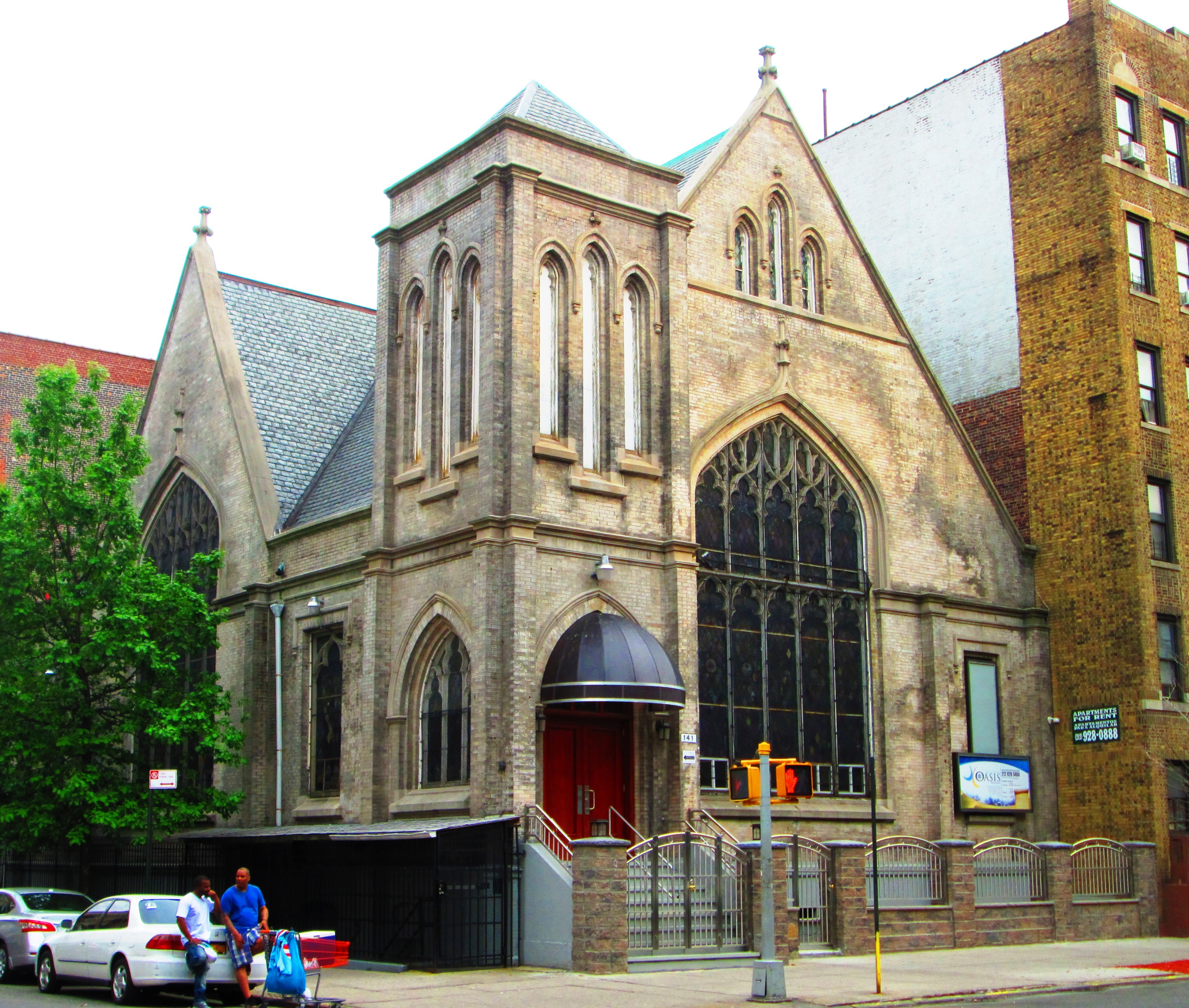
Iglesia Alianza Oasis, Audubon Avenue and 172nd Street

Audubon Avenue is an avenue in the Washington Heights neighborhood in Upper Manhattan that runs north-south, west of and parallel to Amsterdam Avenue. Its southern terminus is at West 165th Street and St. Nicholas Avenue, and its northern terminus is at Fort George Avenue, just north of West 193rd Street. It crosses over the Trans-Manhattan Expressway, east of the eastern portal of the expressway's tunnel.

== History ==
Audubon Avenue is named for naturalist John James Audubon, who owned a farm in the area (the present-day Audubon Park Historic District). The Fort George Amusement Park, now a seating area in Highbridge Park, was located at the northern end of Audubon Avenue from 1895 to 1914.
