= Río Rita =

- Location within Panama
- Coordinates: 9°18′0″N 79°47′24″W
- Country: Panama
- Province: Colón
- Elevation: 100 m (330 ft)

Population (2008)
  - Total: 1,355

Río Rita is a town in the Colón Province of Panama.

== Sources ==
- World Gazetteer: Panama – World-Gazetteer.com
