= Audubon Mountain =

Mountain in Alaska, United States

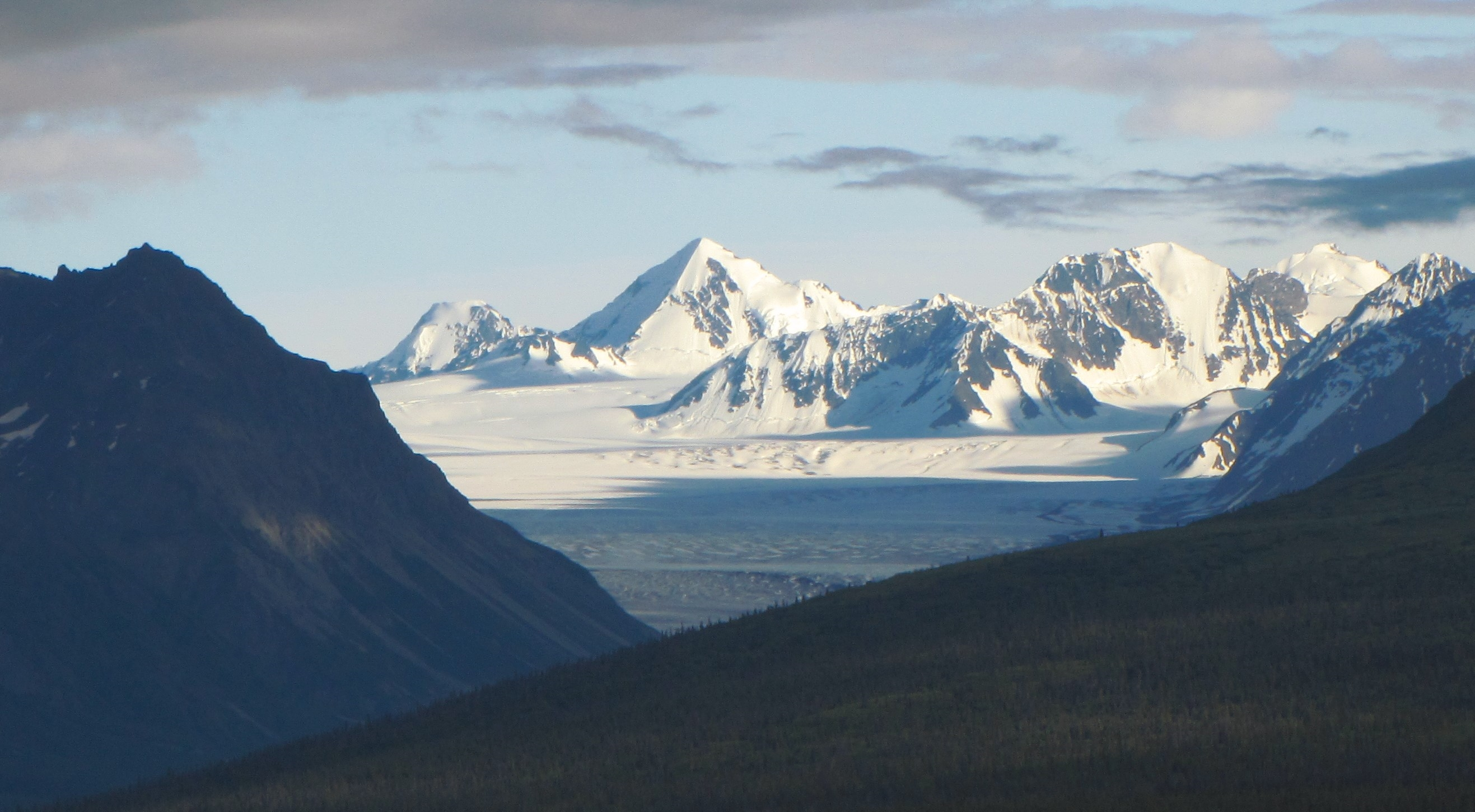
- North aspect, centered at top

Highest point
- Elevation: 8,472 ft (2,582 m)
- Prominence: 1,422 ft (433 m)
- Parent peak: Mount Powder Top (9,140 ft)
- Isolation: 4.16 mi (6.69 km)
- Coordinates: 61°28′17″N 146°47′50″W

Naming
- Etymology: John James Audubon

Geography
- Location within Alaska
- Location: Copper River Census Area
- Country: United States
- State: Alaska
- Parent range: Chugach Mountains
- Topo map: USGS Valdez B-8

Audubon Mountain is an 8,472-foot-elevation (2,582-meter) mountain summit in Alaska, United States.

== Description ==
Audubon Mountain is located 30 miles (48 km) north-northwest of Valdez in the Chugach Mountains. Topographic relief is significant as the summit rises approximately 1,500 feet (457 m) above the surrounding icefield in 0.25 miles (0.40 km). The mountain's name was applied about 1957 by Lawrence E. Nielsen to honor John James Audubon (1785–1851), famous American ornithologist and artist. The toponym was officially adopted in 1965 by the U.S. Board on Geographic Names.

== Climate ==
Based on the Köppen climate classification, Audubon Mountain is located in a tundra climate zone with long, cold, snowy winters, and cool summers. Weather systems coming off the Gulf of Alaska are forced upwards by the Chugach Mountains (orographic lift), causing heavy precipitation in the form of rainfall and snowfall. Winter temperatures can drop below −10 °F with wind chill factors below −20 °F. This climate supports the Nelchina Glacier to the north, Science Glacier to the south, and Tazlina Glacier to the east.

== See also ==
- List of mountain peaks of Alaska
- Geography of Alaska
