= La Gerbetière =

Coordinates: 47°12′45″N 1°44′46″W

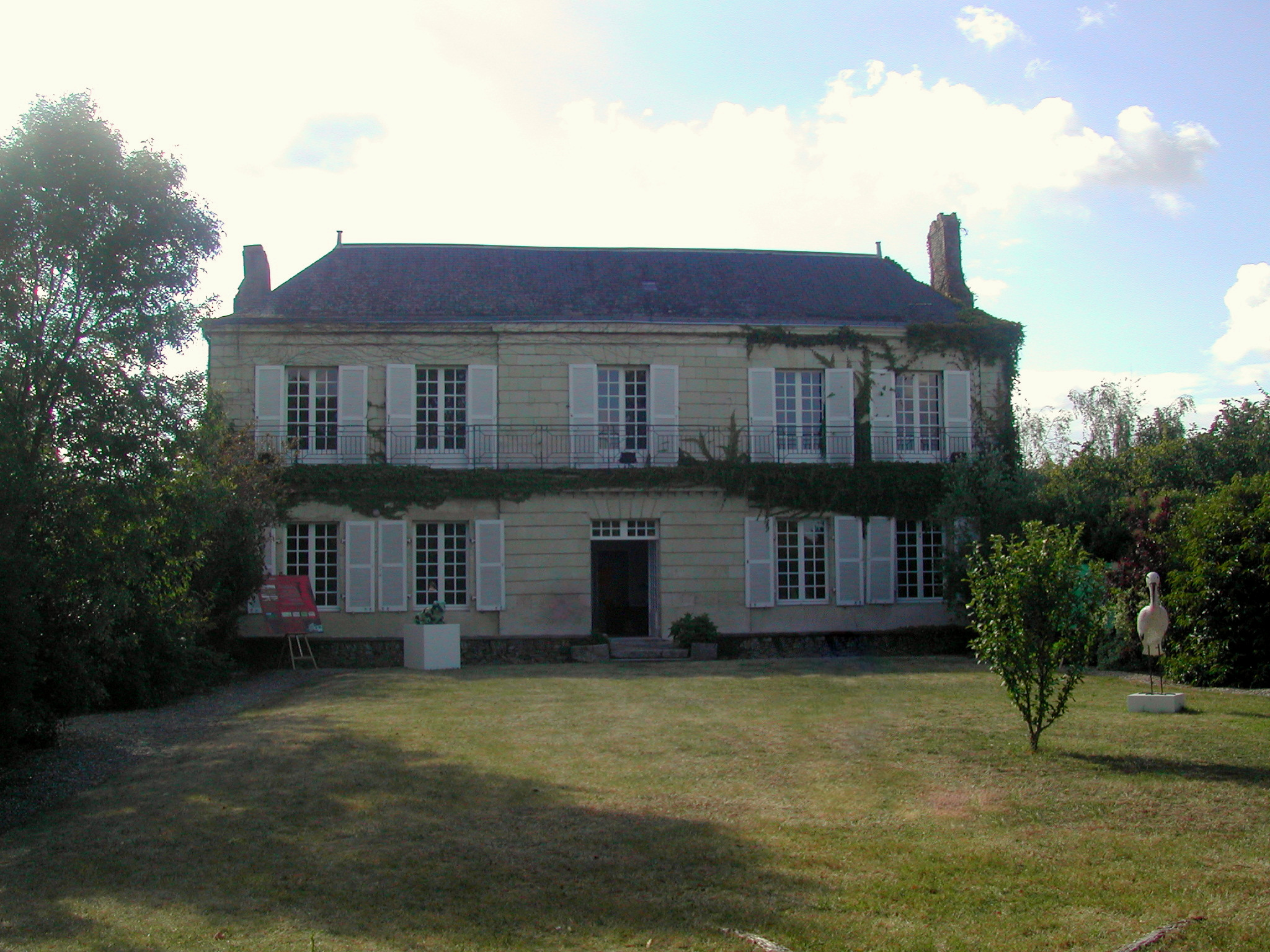
La Gerbetière mansion

La Gerbetière is a mansion in the Couëron commune of the Loire-Atlantique département, France. It was the residence of John James Audubon in his youth.
