= Wildcat Glades Conservation and Audubon Center =

- IUCN category IV (habitat/species management area)
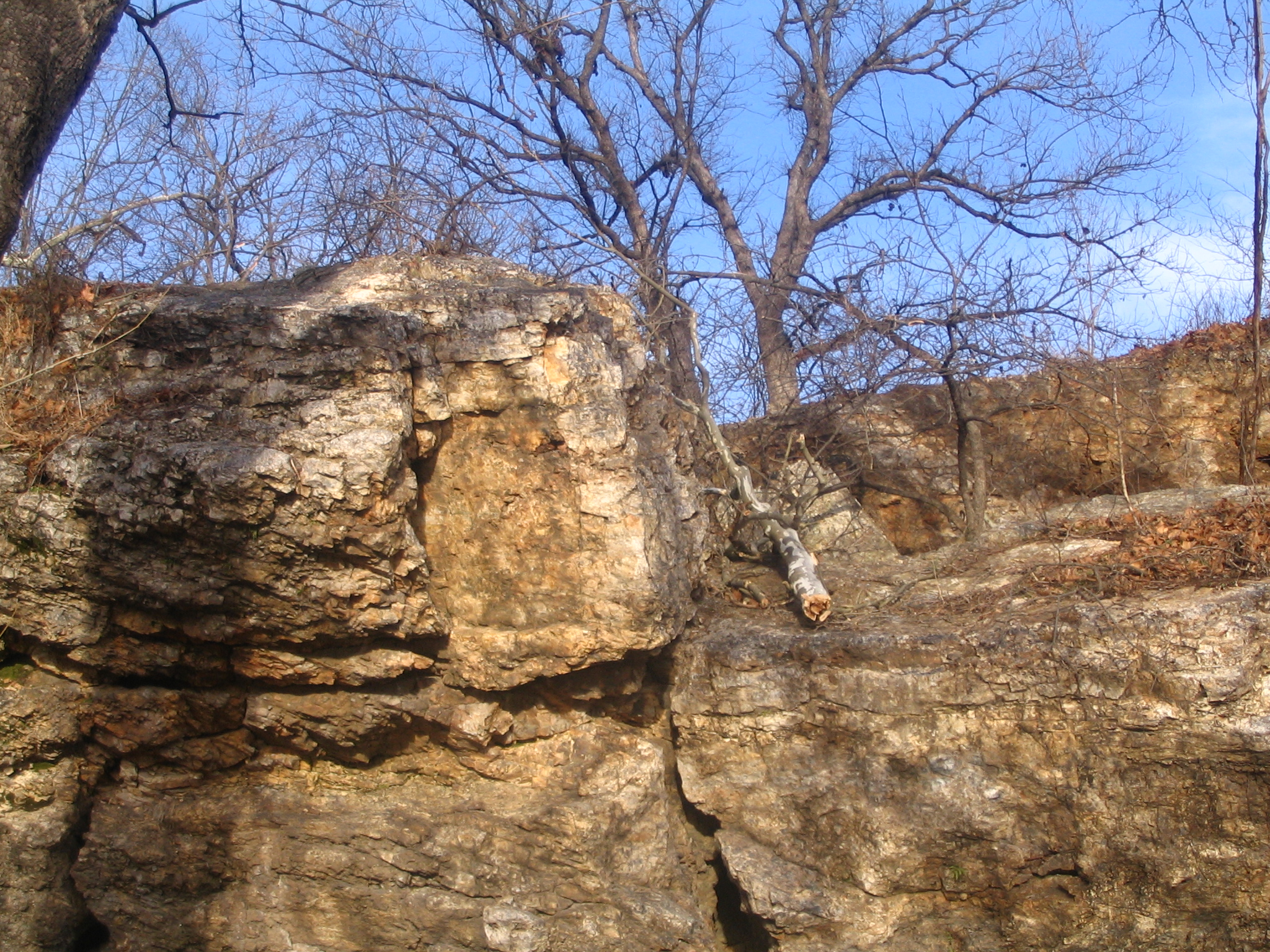
- Chert glades

- Location within Missouri
- Location: Newton County, Missouri, United States
- Nearest city: Joplin, MO
- Coordinates: 37°01′45″N 94°31′03″W
- Area: 27 acres (11 ha)
- Governing body: Missouri Department of Conservation, Audubon Society
- Website: www.wildcatglades.audubon.org

Wildcat Glades Conservation and Audubon Center was an Audubon owned and operated nature center located in a protected area in Joplin, Missouri. It was an Audubon sanctioned environmental education and conservation facility that protected the last remaining globally unique chert glades, as well as other natural resources of the biologically diverse Spring River watershed. Located at the confluence of Silver and Shoal Creeks, the center, now operated by the State of Missouri, showcases plants and animals found on the chert glades and surrounding aquatic and woodland savanna habitats. Chert glades, named after the bedrock on which they have formed, host a unique assemblage of plants and animals that may be found elsewhere in the world, but not typically found together as they are at Wildcat Park. A variety of plants and animals found in surrounding caves, prairie-savanna, riparian corridor, and oak/hickory woodlands converge here for an unusual suite of biological diversity that was being documented, monitored, and protected through education and outreach to the surrounding community and region. The center was a result of a nearly $6 million partnership project of the National Audubon Society, City of Joplin, and Missouri Department of Conservation. The center was one of two Audubon Centers managed by Audubon Missouri, a state office the National Audubon Society. The Audubon Center at Riverlands is located in north St. Louis on the Mississippi river, near its confluence with the Missouri river.

In July, 2018, the National Audubon Society withdrew from the agreement with the city of Joplin and the Missouri Department of Conservation and turned over the facility and lease to the state of Missouri. The facility and site is currently now more properly funded and managed by the Missouri Department of Conservation.

== Biological uniqueness ==
Chert glades are a habitat which only exists in southern Missouri. They are described as a near desert-like environment. This is due to the hard chert bedrock underneath the soil, which has eroded and been exposed to the surface. Plants characteristic of arid areas, including cacti, grow here. Other plants had to adapt to the environment, resulting in some species having stunted growth. There are only 60 acres (24 ha) of chert glades remaining, of which 27 acres (11 ha) are in Wildcat Glades.

In 2002, researchers from the New York Botanical Gardens visited Wildcat Glades to document lichen species as part of a regional study. During this visit, the researchers discovered a previously unknown species of lichen here, Dermatocarpon arenosaxi, an unusual species that has adapted to survive both on land and in water. Additionally, another lichen species, Xanthoria parietina, was identified here and was the most western location the species had been identified, as its distribution is typically eastern United States. In 2010, during another botanical survey of the park by the Missouri Native Plant Society, Trifolium carolinianum was found here, once thought to have been extirpated in Missouri since the 1930s.

A variety of birds have been observed nesting in the park including prothonotary warbler, bluebird, Cooper's hawk, red-shouldered hawk, American robin, mourning dove, black-capped chickadee, eastern phoebe, red-headed woodpecker, Canada goose, yellow-crowned night heron, indigo bunting, and cliff swallow, among others. In 2011, an American bald eagle attempted to nest at the park but was unsuccessful and relocated to an unknown location. Prothonotary warblers nest along the Shoal Creek corridor and monitoring takes place though annual counts. Annual bird counts are held in the spring and winter to document numbers and types of bird species located in the area.

An endangered freshwater mussel, the neosho mucket, is found in Shoal Creek and was the focus of a transplant rescue in 2000 when the new Redings Mill Bridge/Hwy 86 overpass was constructed. Led by aquatics professor Chris Barnhart of Missouri State University, students gathered and relocated mussels upstream from the construction zone so the mussels would not be affected by construction.

Typical glade inhabitants, like the state-listed eastern collared lizard, Missouri's largest, reaching lengths of 12 to 15 inches (30 to 38 cm), were one found sporadically throughout the park until late 2007. In the 1950s, an unconfirmed capture of a Texas horned lizard near the park was reported. Horned lizards are no longer found in southwest Missouri and are thought to be extirpated. Greater roadrunners can occasionally be seen, along with the giant red-headed centipede, Scolopendra polymorpha, which reaches lengths of 8 inches.

In 2010, researchers identified a 20-inch western pygmy rattler, Sistrurus miliarius streckeri, on Silver Creek Glade. Earlier that year, a center visitor reported an adult timber rattlesnake, Crotalus horridus, crossing the trail along the Woodland Loop, although it was not confirmed by staff who searched for it. Osage copperheads, Agkistrodon contortrix phaeogaster, are regularly seen in the park.

== Sustainable technologies ==
The center showcases a variety of environmentally-friendly technologies that provide opportunities to learn how construction and operations can be sensitive to the surrounding environment. The nearly 11,000 sq ft (1,000 m^{2}) facility is certified by the U.S. Green Building Council as LEED Silver. The center utilizes a closed-loop geothermal heating and cooling system and also has a living/green roof, composed of 6–8 inches (150–200 mm) of soil substrate and native plants of the park. The roof absorbs and filters approximately 1,000,000 US gallons (3,800,000 L; 830,000 imp gal) of water annually, and during rain events slowly releases the water into adjacent biodetention areas over the course of hours and days, thus decreasing the volume of water that contributes to flash-flooding of the nearby streams. The 60-vehicle parking lot is permeable and allows water to slowly absorb in the ground, while helping recharge the local aquifer. Various other technologies in the building include light sensitive overhead lighting which automatically adjusts to daylight levels, as well as auto-off lights, and light shelves in the classrooms allow reflected sunlight to penetrate deeper into the building, saving electricity. Flash heaters are installed in building faucets negating the need for inefficient water heaters. Park trails are paved in part with locally derived reused asphalt millings containing 6 percent pulverized glass.

== Facilities ==
The facilities include an 11,000 sq ft nature center with a 1,300-US-gallon (4,900 L; 1,100 imp gal) aquarium, classrooms, exhibits, and a library. Outdoors, there are 4 miles (6.4 km) of trails with eco-type learning stations, a gazebo, and a small pavilion. The center is located within the city-owned 60 acre Wildcat Park.
