= The vivaparous quadrupeds of North America =

1840s lithograph folio

Plate XV. Oregon flying squirrel

Plate LI. Canada otter; the animal is caught in a trap, which "shows, perhaps, some of Audubon's concern" for wildlife, and serves as a historical record of hunting and trapping animals for their pelts, an important source of income for North Americans

The viviparous quadrupeds of North America is a book of lithographs of mammals that give live birth and are native to the continent of North America, painted by John James Audubon and John Woodhouse Audubon, text by Reverend John Bachman. Victor Gifford Audubon and Maria Martin painted some of the backgrounds. The original watercolor paintings were reproduced as hand-colored lithographs printed by J. T. Bowen of Philadelphia. An imperial folio, or elephant folio, edition of 150 images was published 1845 to 1848 in 30 parts. The original edition was the physically largest full-color book completed in the United States in the 19th century. (The Birds of America was printed in the UK.)

Bachman's text was first published in three octavo volumes from 1846 to 1854, and then combined with six new plates from John Woodhouse Audubon in an octavo edition released as The Quadrupeds of North America from 1849 to 1854.

Bachman was a zoologist and Lutheran minister from South Carolina; two of his daughters were married to Audubon's sons. Audubon made an expedition to the Yellowstone River via the Missouri River in 1843 to observe and paint animals, but simultaneously lost all his teeth and began a precipitous decline. John James went blind and succumbed to some form of dementia during the creation of the book, so about half the images are his work, and John Woodhouse completed the remainder. The artists mostly painted from taxidermied or captive animals but did undertake two expeditions to find live subjects.

Among other animals, the work depicts two subspecies of the red wolf, the Florida black wolf, extinct since 1908, and Texas red wolf, extinct since 1970. Human–animal interchanges are depicted in tableaux such as a gang of rats stealing chicken eggs and a tawny weasel snatching a rooster out of a barnyard.

Christie's sold an original copy of Viviparous Quadrupeds in 2001 for US$270,000 (equivalent to $490,932 in 2025). Swann Galleries sold a copy in 2013 for US$288,000 (equivalent to $398,057 in 2025). Sotheby's sold a copy in 2014 that had been bought by the Indiana Historical Society in 1951 for $900. Christie's sold another copy in 2022 for US$441,000 (equivalent to $485,180 in 2025). Neal Auction of New Orleans sold a copy in 2025 for $261,500.
