= Julius Bien =

American lithographer

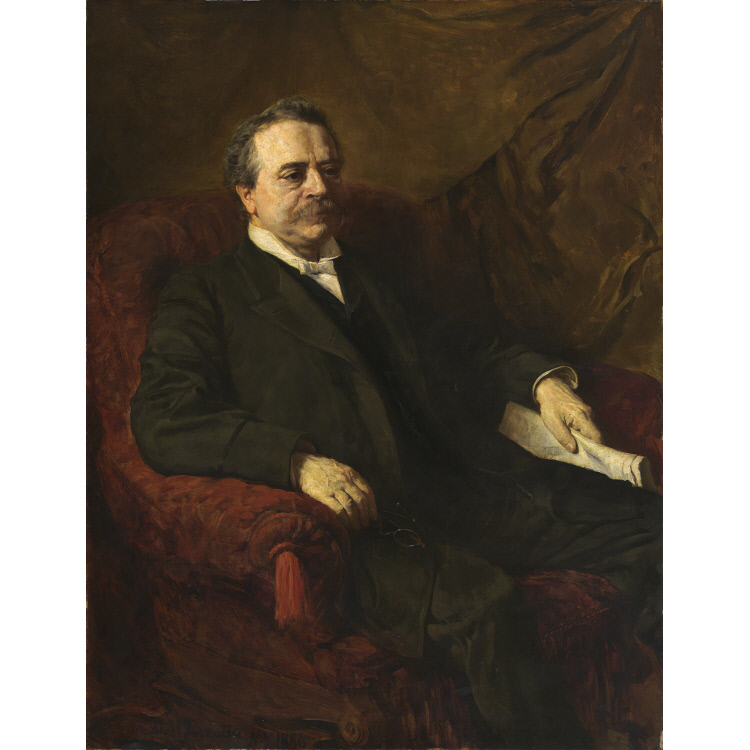
Julius Bien

Julius Bien (27 September 1826, Naumburg – 21 December 1909, Manhattan, New York) was an American lithographer originally from Germany, as well as president of B’nai B’rith for more than three decades. He produced a lithographed edition of John James Audubon's The Birds of America.

== Early life ==
Bien was born in Naumburg, Hesse, a small town near Kassel, as the child of an artist and teacher. He was schooled at the Kunsthochschule Kassel, and then at the Städel Institute in Frankfurt as a student of Moritz Daniel Oppenheim. Like many other Jews he fought on the side of the liberals in the 1848 Revolution, and fled to New York in 1848 or 1849.

== Photography ==
He began a lithography studio, first with a single press, and turned that into a large and successful company by century's end.

Bien's studio produced work in different qualities, indicating he was willing to take on any job—city views and maps, mechanical and architectural drawings and advertisements—but on the whole his work was "distinguished by its technical superiority and flexible manipulation of print media". He worked for the federal government as well after the American Civil War, and was noted as a skilled printer of maps with "a new level of scientific accuracy" (a 1902 map of Connecticut was praised as "all that could be desired"), winning many awards, and becoming a "prominent citizen of New York" as well as the first president of the National Lithographers Association. From 1854 to 1857, and again from 1868 to 1900, he was president of B'nai B'rith, contributing substantially to its internationalization.

=== Audubon, Bien edition ===
In the late 1850s, Bien was sought out by John James Audubon's youngest son, John Woodhouse Audubon, to produce a new full-size edition of The Birds of America, an edition to be sold via subscription. Bien was a specialist in chromolithography, a specialty he had learned in Germany. The first edition had been printed in black and white, and then finished with watercolor paint; the new edition promised a greater level of color accuracy. Lithography, as opposed to copper-plate engraving, also produced more "softness" in the printed image. Bien used the original copper plates to transfer the images onto stone. He used only six colors, and achieved variety by printing colors over another, sometimes in dotted patterns. In the end, the project was not finished: of the original 435 plates, only 150 were made and in 1860 publication was halted. John Woodhouse Audubon died in 1862, indebted, ending all prospects of finishing it, and there was significant financial insecurity at a time of war. At the same time, ornithological tastes changed with the work of Spencer Fullerton Baird, who introduced greater scientific accuracy. Still, the Bien edition remains an important publication: his illustrations "represent the highest standard chromolithography had achieved, and even now they stand as a landmark to the medium. Bien pushed against the limits of available technology with intuitive artistry in an effort to provide information and aesthetic pleasure to the mass audience of a democratic society".
