= The Birds of America =

1827–1838 book by John James Audubon

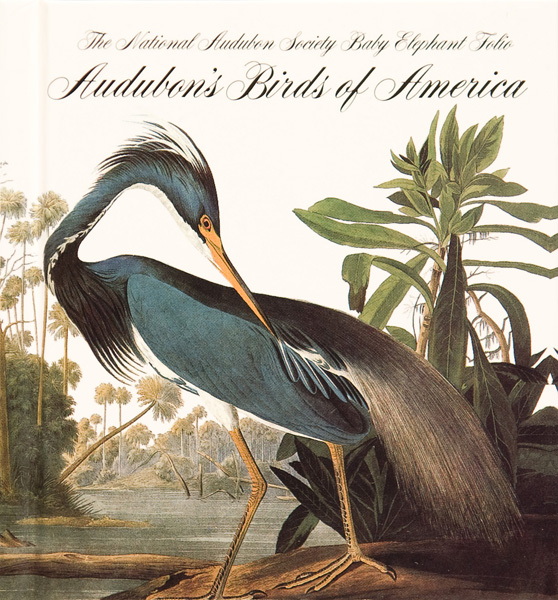
- The cover shows a Louisiana heron, Egretta tricolor (now called tricolored heron)
- Author: John James Audubon
- Original title: The Birds of America; from original drawings by John James Audubon
- Illustrator: John James Audubon; Joseph Mason
- Subject: Birds – North America; Birds – pictorial works
- Genre: Ornithology
- Publication date: 1827–1838
- Publication place: United Kingdom
- Pages: 435
- Dewey Decimal: 598.2
- LC Class: QL674 .A9 1827

The Birds of America is a book by naturalist and painter John James Audubon, containing illustrations of a wide variety of birds of the United States. It was first published as a series in sections between 1827 and 1838, in Edinburgh and London. Not all of the specimens illustrated in the work were collected by Audubon himself; some were sent to him by John Kirk Townsend, who had collected them on Nathaniel Jarvis Wyeth's 1834 expedition with Thomas Nuttall.

The work consists of 435 hand-coloured, life-size prints, made from engraved plates, measuring around 39 by 26 inches (99 by 66 cm). It includes images of five extinct birds and three more possibly extinct birds: Carolina parakeet, passenger pigeon, Labrador duck, great auk, heath hen, and, possibly, the Eskimo curlew, ivory-billed woodpecker, and Bachman's warbler. Also, there are five more images of 'mystery birds' that are not identified with any extant species: Townsend's finch (identified in a later edition as Townsend's bunting), Cuvier's kinglet, carbonated swamp warbler, small-headed flycatcher, and Blue Mountain warbler.

Art historians describe Audubon's work as being of high quality and printed with "artistic finesse". The plant life backgrounds of some 50 of the bird studies were painted by Audubon's assistant Joseph Mason, but he is not credited for his work in the book. He shot many specimen birds as well as transporting and maintaining supplies for Audubon. Audubon however used the background plants and insects painted by Maria Martin, later wife of John Bachman, with credit. George Lehman was hired to draw some of the perches and background detail. Audubon also authored the companion book Ornithological Biographies.

== Early publication history ==
Plate 1 by John James Audubon depicting a wild turkey (Meleagris gallopavo).

About 1820, around the age of 35, Audubon declared his intention to paint every bird in North America. In his bird art, he mainly forsook oil paint, the medium of serious artists of the day, in favour of watercolours and pastel crayons (and occasionally pencil, charcoal, chalk, gouache, and pen and ink). As early as 1807, he developed a method of using wires and threads to hold dead birds in lifelike poses while he drew them.

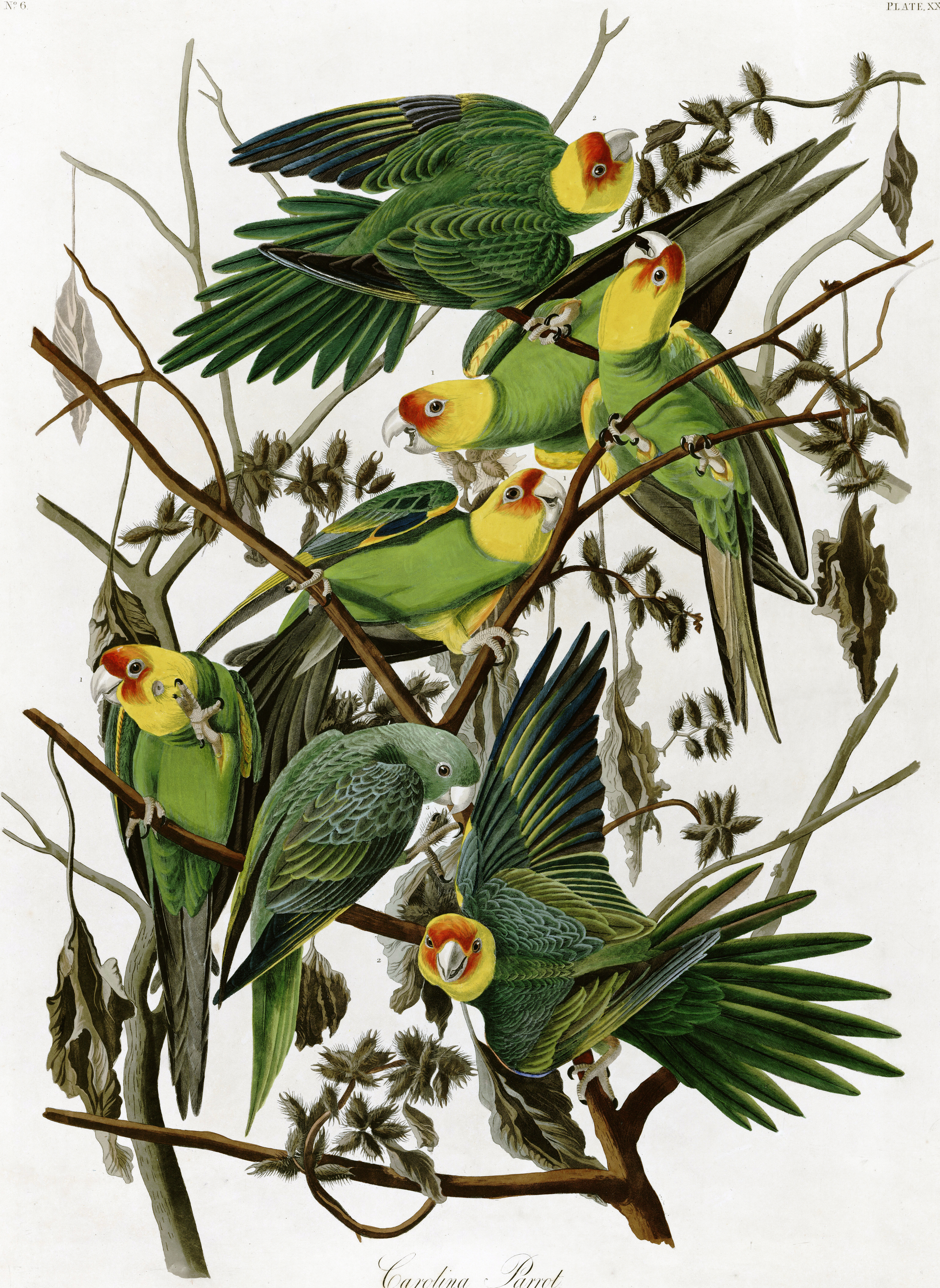
Carolina parakeet (Conuropsis carolinensis), now extinct

In 1823, Audubon went to Philadelphia and New York, looking for financial support using subscriptions to enable him to publish his artwork. He sold the copper engraving plates through on a subscription basis in North America and Europe. Those subscribed obtained five plates at a time. Each subscriber received prints of three smaller birds, a larger bird and a mid-sized bird. The prints were produced from 1827 to 1838 that cost each subscriber around $1,000. It is thought that no more than 120 complete sets exist today. Each set consists of 435 individual plates that are based upon the original paintings. Each plate was engraved, printed, and hand colored by Robert Havell of London. While William Lizars, of Edinburgh, engraved the first ten plates, Havell actually finished some of those. Havell, in some cases added elements such as insects to the plate.

Audubon often found support lacking. As a result, in 1826, he set sail for the United Kingdom with 250 of his original illustrations, looking for the financial support of subscribers and the technical abilities of engravers and printers. After exhibiting his drawings in Liverpool and Manchester, he journeyed to Edinburgh, where he met the accomplished engraver William H. Lizars. Lizars engraved up to ten of the first plates but was unable to continue the project when his colourists went on strike. In 1827, Audubon engaged the noted London animal engraver Robert Havell Jr., and his father, Robert Havell Sr. Havell Jr. oversaw the project through to its completion in 1838.

The original edition of The Birds of America (sometimes called the Havell Edition after its printer, and sometimes called the "Double Elephant Folio", because of its size) was printed on handmade paper 39.5 inches tall by 28.5 inches wide. The principal printing technique was copperplate etching, but engraving and aquatint were also used. Colorists applied each color in assembly-line fashion (over fifty were hired for the work).

Audubon funded the costly printing project through a pay-as-you-go subscription. From 1826 to 1829, he travelled around the UK and to Paris, lecturing on ornithology and frontier American life in an effort to entice wealthy patrons to subscribe to the series of prints. Subscribers included: King Charles X of France; Queen Adelaide of the United Kingdom; the 2nd Earl Spencer; and, later, the Americans Daniel Webster and Henry Clay.

Prints were issued in sets of five every month or two in tin cases and each set usually included one very large bird, one medium-sized bird, and three small birds. The plates were published unbound and without any text to avoid having to furnish free copies to the British legal deposit libraries. It is estimated that not more than 200 complete sets were ever compiled. An accompanying text, issued separately, was written by Audubon and the Scottish naturalist and ornithologist William MacGillivray and published in five volumes in Edinburgh between 1831 and 1839, under the title Ornithological Biography, or, An account of the habits of the birds of the United States of America. The additional cost of the five volumes of text brought the total cost of plates and text to about $1000.

Three universities were original subscribers to the double-elephant folio version: Columbia University, Harvard University, and the University of South Carolina. Audubon had personally visited Columbia in 1833 and displayed his drawings to the college's president, William Alexander Duer, after which the college raised $800 for its subscription, which was completed in 1838.

After the folio edition was completed, Audubon decided to produce a more affordable edition and employed a lithographer from Philadelphia named J. T. Bowen. Bowen and his team created a smaller Royal Octavo edition, which was issued to subscribers in seven volumes and completed in 1844. Five more octavo editions were completed through 1877. The octavo edition used the text of the Ornithological biography but increased the number of plates to 500, separating some birds which had originally appeared together. Some new drawings were included, mostly by Audubon's youngest son John Woodhouse Audubon, though Audubon and members of Bowen's team also contributed.

The Bien Edition (after chromolithography pioneer Julius Bien), was a full-sized reissue published in 1858 by Roe Lockwood in New York under the supervision of John Woodhouse Audubon. Due in part to the Civil War, the edition was never finished; only 15 parts of the 44 part series were completed. This edition consisted of 105 plates and included none of the original text. Fewer than 100 subscriptions were sold, making this edition rarer than other early editions. When describing Audubon's practice of obtaining his subjects, ornithologist Anthony Bledsoe said, "Audubon used what we like to call today as the barrel-of-the-shotgun method...After he killed the birds, he would use a complex system of wires and strings to position the birds. Previous artists would draw the birds in a stiff position, but Audubon was different. He drew the birds in dynamic ways, by positioning them how he would observe them in the field."

== Public exhibitions ==
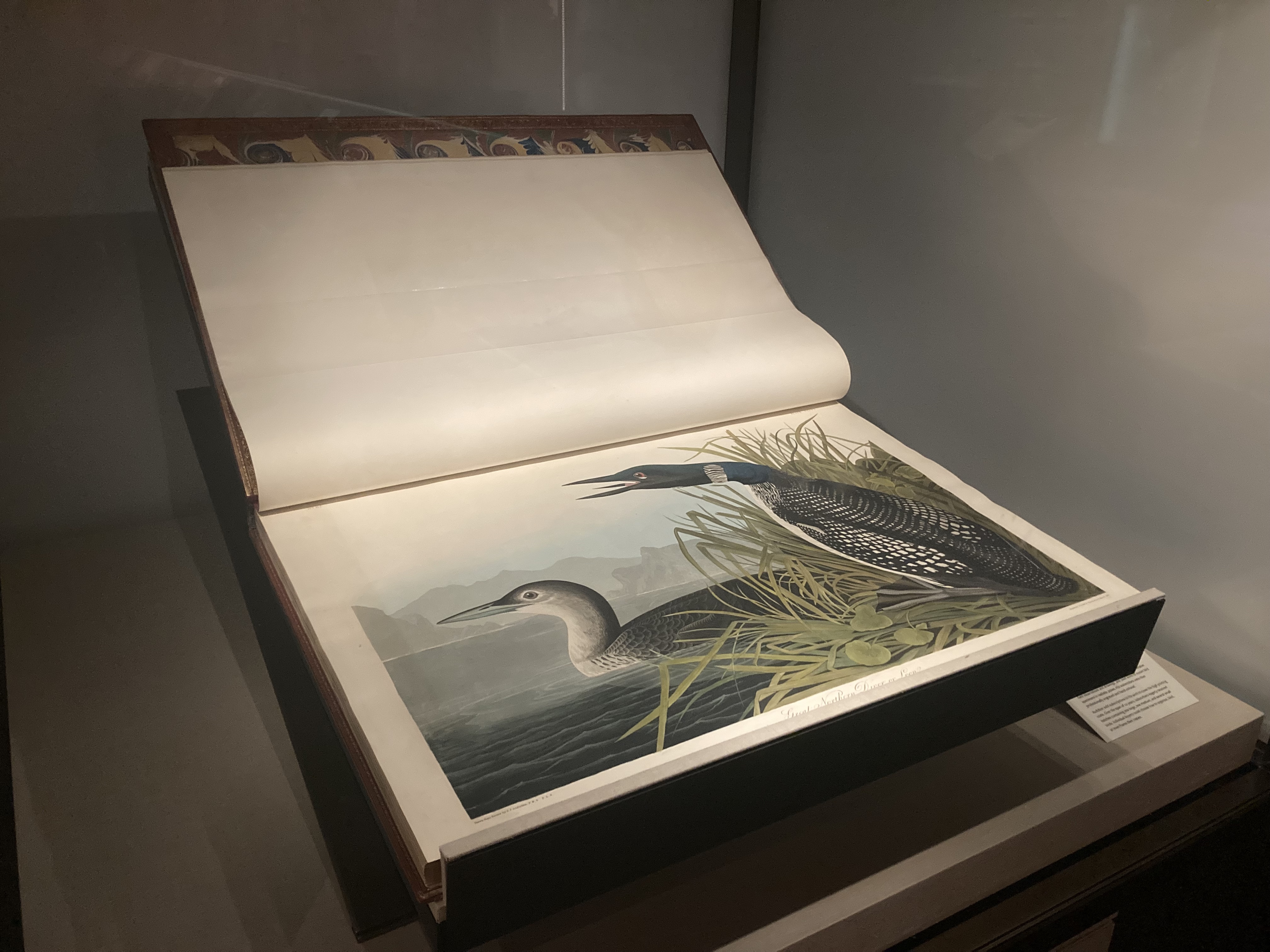
The fourth volume, on display at the National Museum of Natural History in Washington, D.C.

A full 8-volume, double-elephant folio version is on public display in the Audubon Room at the Harlan Hatcher Graduate Library at the University of Michigan, Ann Arbor. This, the first book purchased by the university, was bought in 1839 for $970 (equivalent to $90,000 in 2025), at the time an amazing sum. The entire volume of 435 plates is also available for viewing online at the websites of the University of Michigan and the Public Library of Cincinnati and Hamilton County.

Since 1992, the Louisiana State University Libraries have hosted "Audubon Day," a semi-annual public showing of all four volumes of LSU's copy of the Birds of America. The set formerly belonged to one of the original subscribers, the Duke of Northumberland, and was purchased with a grant from the Crown Zellerbach Corporation in 1964. In recent years, the event has drawn more than 200 visitors. It was profiled in a 2011 Wall Street Journal article titled "The Joys of Slow Looking."

In 2003, the University of Pittsburgh, which owns a complete collection of Birds of America that had been recently restored and preserved by the Etherington Conservation Center, mounted a major exhibition of 62 selected plates and other materials in its University Art Gallery. Following this, the university constructed an exhibit case on the ground floor of the school's Hillman Library to continuously display a rotating selection of plates to the public. Single plates have been exhibited for two weeks at a time in plate number order. In 2007, the university undertook a project to digitize every plate from Birds of America, as well as Audubon's Ornithological Biography, and, for the first time, presented the complete set for public viewing through one site on the internet. This event, called "Audubon day" was first conducted in 2011.

In 2004, there was an attempted heist of the Transylvania University's four double-sized folios of Birds of America by four college students. The robbers tasered the librarian, but were unable to complete the heist and all plead guilty and were sentenced to seven-year prison terms.

From September 25, 2005 - March 26, 2006, the National Gallery of Art exhibited 50 hand-colored prints from its early edition of The Birds of America, “…one of only 2 known sets of prints preserved in their original unbound state” in Audubon's Dream Realized.

In 2007, the book was the subject of an exhibition by the Teylers Museum in Haarlem, which owns a copy it ordered from the original subscription. To commemorate the book's record-breaking sale, the museum decided to display its copy (for which the museum eventually paid 2200 guilders—a fortune at the time—during the years 1827–1838) until January 2011.

The Buffalo & Erie County Public Library's Rare Book Room has a complete Birds of America, which is often on display.

All of Audubon's and Mason's known extant watercolors preparatory for Birds of America are housed at the New-York Historical Society in New York City.

The Stark Museum of Art in Orange, Texas, owns and exhibits John James Audubon's personal copy of Birds of America.

The Field Museum of Natural History in Chicago, Illinois owns a copy that previously belonged to Audubon's friend and family doctor, Dr. Benjamin Phillips. Only this copy and that owned by the Stark Museum of Art contain 13 additional plates, added late in the project to correct earlier mistakes by compositing new plates onto previous prints. The Field Museum produced and displayed an exhibit based around their copy of Birds of America in 2019–2020.

In 2010, the North Carolina Museum of Art began a five-year exhibition of its restored four-volume set purchased for the state by Governor William Alexander Graham in 1846.

Liverpool Central Library currently has a copy of Birds of America on display in a glass case, with its pages turned weekly, as well as being displayed through an interactive kiosk, allowing readers to view the contents close-up without damaging the original copy using an Evoke Ev5 Kiosk.

In 2022, the National Museum of Scotland hosted a major Audubon exhibition, exhibiting a copy of the book, along with prints from their archive and emphasizing the book's historical ties with Edinburgh.

Paisley Museum and Art Gallery, in Paisley, Scotland, has the four volume elephant folio of Birds of America.

The Royal College of Physicians and Surgeons in Glasgow, Scotland holds two volumes, one of which is kept on display in the library.

Two copies are on permanent display on the mezzanine level of the Beinecke Rare Book & Manuscript Library at Yale University.

The Rubenstein Rare Book & Manuscript Library at Duke University maintains a four-volume set. Two volumes are on permanent display with pages turned monthly.

The Havell copy of "Birds of America"—so named because it was the personal copy of Audubon's engraver Robert Havell—is on permanent exhibit in Watkinson Library at Trinity College, Connecticut. Audubon scholars Waldemar Fries and Susanne Low have each attested to the high quality of Trinity’s copy, Fries proclaiming it “probably the finest extant” example of Audubon’s work and Low stating that it “has perhaps the most subtle and true-to-life colors” of the surviving copies. Each week at Watkinson Library a new plate is revealed in an event called "Flipping the Bird." In September of 2022 the library completed its decade-long progress through all four volumes of "Birds of America" and began again with Plate I of volume one.

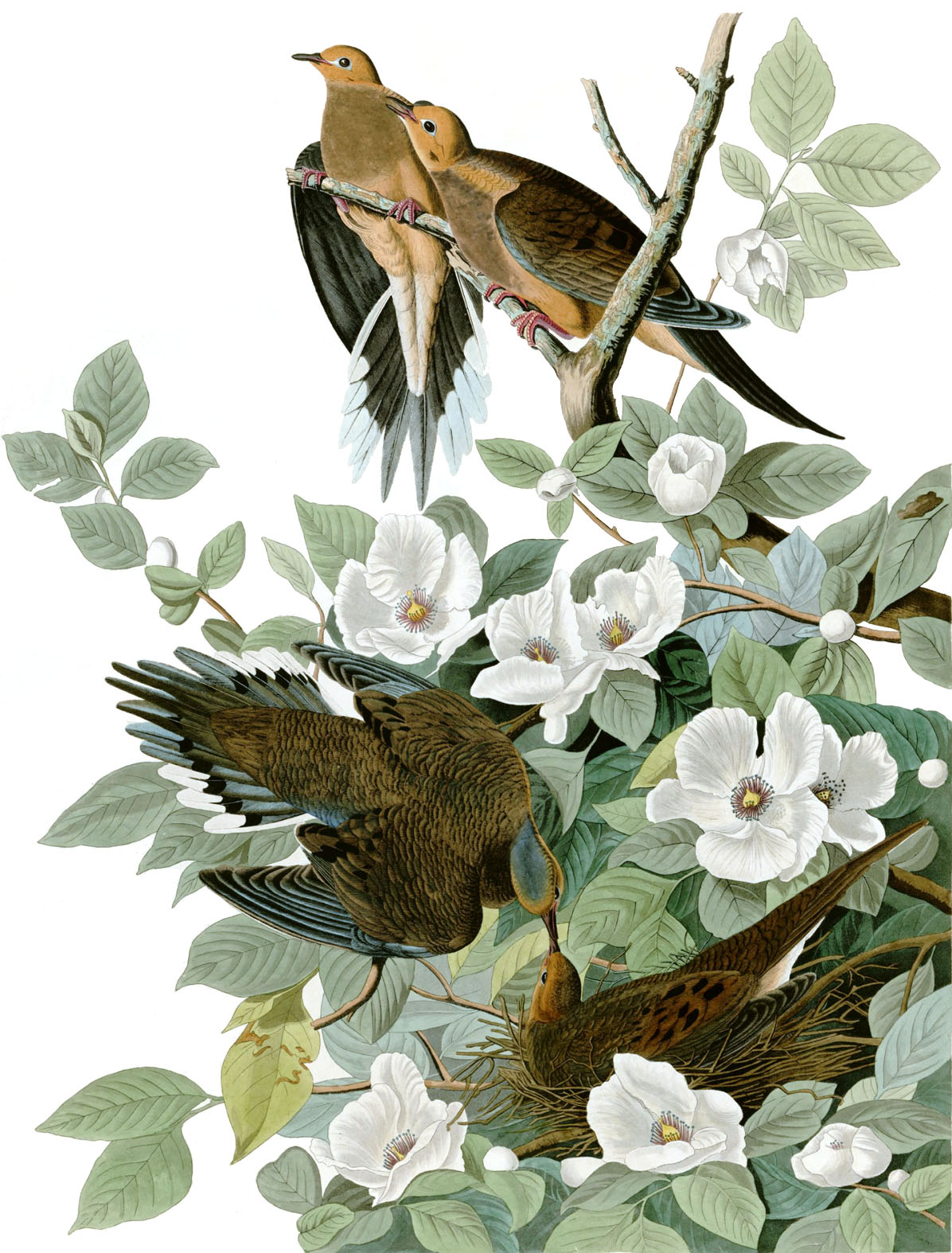
Carolina pigeon, Zenaida macroura (now called mourning dove).

== Collections and archives ==
Though individual prints are commonly available, only 120 complete sets are known to exist. One complete copy of The Birds of America exists as part of The Darlington Collection at the University of Pittsburgh. Dartmouth College in New Hampshire owns a partial set that originally belonged to Daniel Webster, along with an even more rare copy of Audubon's original prospectus shared with publishers, of which there are only 16 extant copies. The Birds of America is on permanent display in Trinity College, Connecticut's Watkinson Library, and was owned by the engraver, Robert Havell. It was donated to the college in 1900 by Gurdon Wadsworth Russell, an 1834 graduate of Trinity. Union College in Schenectady, NY, possesses a complete copy that was purchased by its president Eliphalet Nott in 1844.

Toronto Public Library also holds a copy; originally a four-volume set, it was unbound to preserve the individual plates which have been digitized in the library's Digital Archive and stored in custom-made boxes in the Toronto Reference Library. Another complete copy of the prints, bound in 17 volumes, belongs to the Library of Parliament in Ottawa, Canada. The McGill University Library copy is one of the crown jewels in McGill's Blacker Wood Natural History Collection.

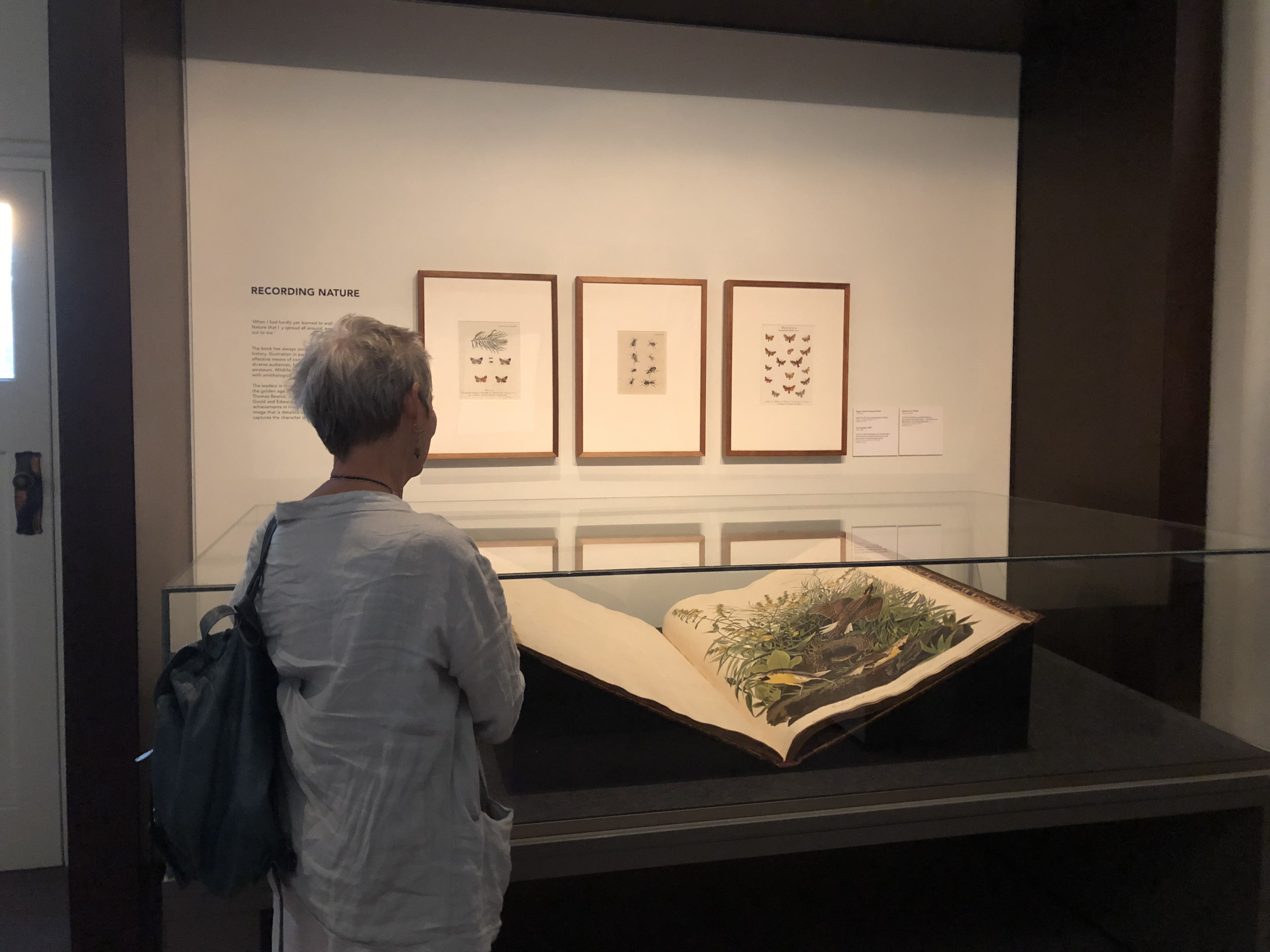
A copy on display at State Library Victoria, Melbourne, Australia

In Australia, the Melbourne Public Library (now State Library Victoria) purchased a four-volume complete copy in 1871 from William Stallard, a school principal in Geelong. The library's president, Sir Redmond Barry, negotiated to purchase the copy for £100, half what had been asked, and the library spent a further £16 on restoring the bindings on three of the volumes. Stallard was in financial difficulties at the time and later committed suicide. The Mitchell Library in Glasgow, Scotland, also holds a full, four-volume set of this publication. Another complete collection is housed with Meisei University in Tokyo, Japan.

== Recent sales ==
In March 2000, Sheikh Saud Al-Thani of Qatar purchased a copy of The Birds of America at a Christie's auction for $8.8 million, a record for any book at auction.

In December 2010, The Economist magazine estimated that, adjusted for inflation, five of the ten highest prices ever paid for printed books were paid for copies of The Birds of America. Of the 120 copies known to survive, only thirteen are held in private collections. In March 2000, the Fox-Bute copy sold at Christie's, New York, for $8,802,500. In December 2005, an unbound copy, the Providence Athenaeum Set, sold, again at Christie's, New York, for $5.6 million.

On 6 December 2010, a complete copy of the first edition was sold in London at Sotheby's for £7,321,250 during the sale of Magnificent Books, Manuscripts and Drawings from the collection of the 2nd Baron Hesketh. The winning bid was a record auction price for a printed book and was placed by London-based art dealer Michael Tollemache, who outbid three others during the auction. According to the provenance details reported by the auction house, the copy's original owner was Henry Witham of Durham, listed as subscriber 11 in Audubon's Ornithological Biography; the first volume of the set bears a presentation inscription from Witham's wife, dated 24 June 1831. Lord Hesketh had bought the copy from a descendant of Witham at a Christie's auction on 3 July 1951, paying £7,000.

On 20 January 2012, a complete copy of the first edition was sold by the heirs of the 4th Duke of Portland at Christie's, New York, for $7.9 million. The buyer was identified only as "an American collector who bid by phone." The sale brought the number of copies known to have survived to 120 – 107 in institution collections and 13 in private hands.

On 18 December 2019, a complete copy of the first edition was sold by Sotheby's, New York, for $6.6 million. This copy was an early subscriber's edition which had originally belonged to the Yorkshire Philosophical Society and was later bought by Joseph Verner Reed Jr.

== Plates ==
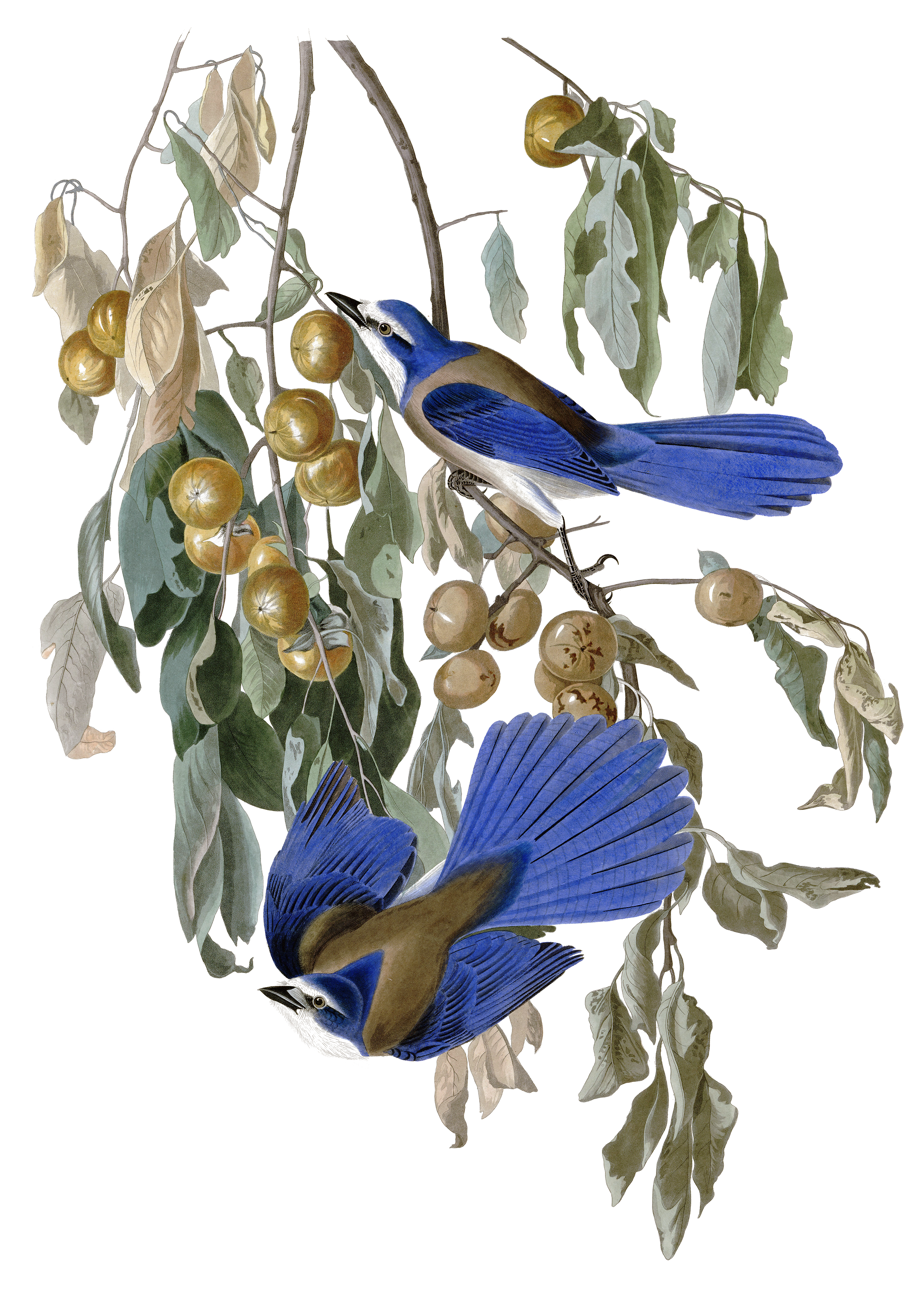
Florida jay (Aphelocoma coerulescens)

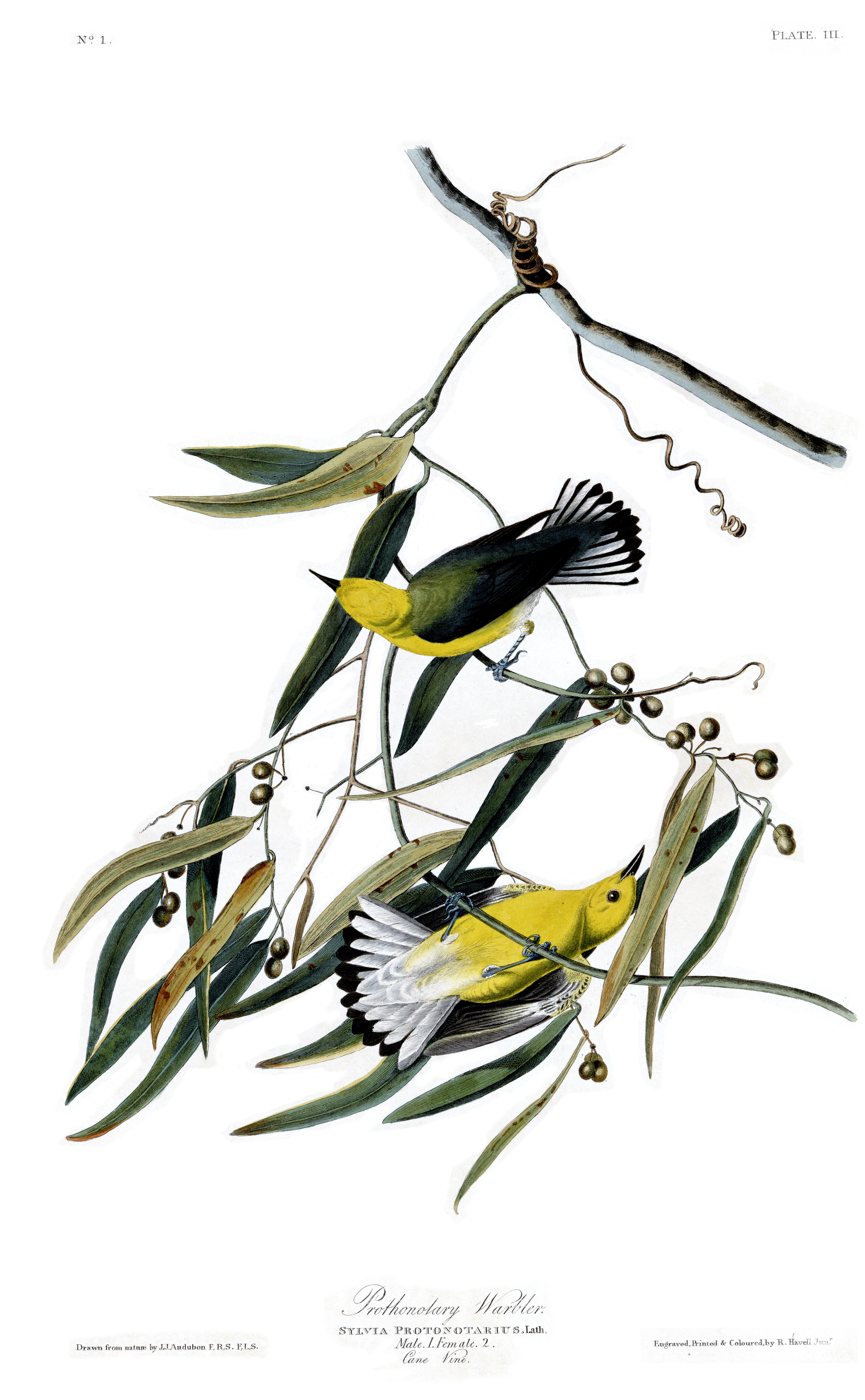
Prothonotary warbler (Protonotaria citrea) in plate 3

Great horned owl
(Bubo virginianus)

Harlan's hawk in plate 86

Bird of Washington, one of several mystery birds which have not been confirmed. It may have been plagiarised from Rees's Cyclopædia.

Turkey vulture
(Cathartes aura)

Canada goose
(Branta canadensis)

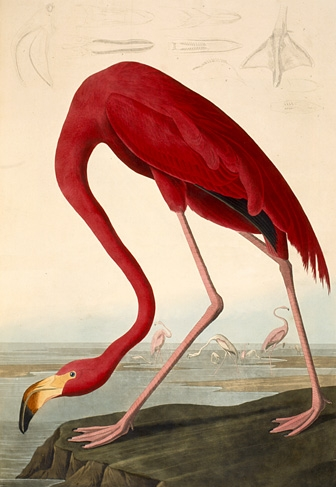
American flamingo
(Phoenicopterus ruber)

Crested caracara
(Caracara cheriway)

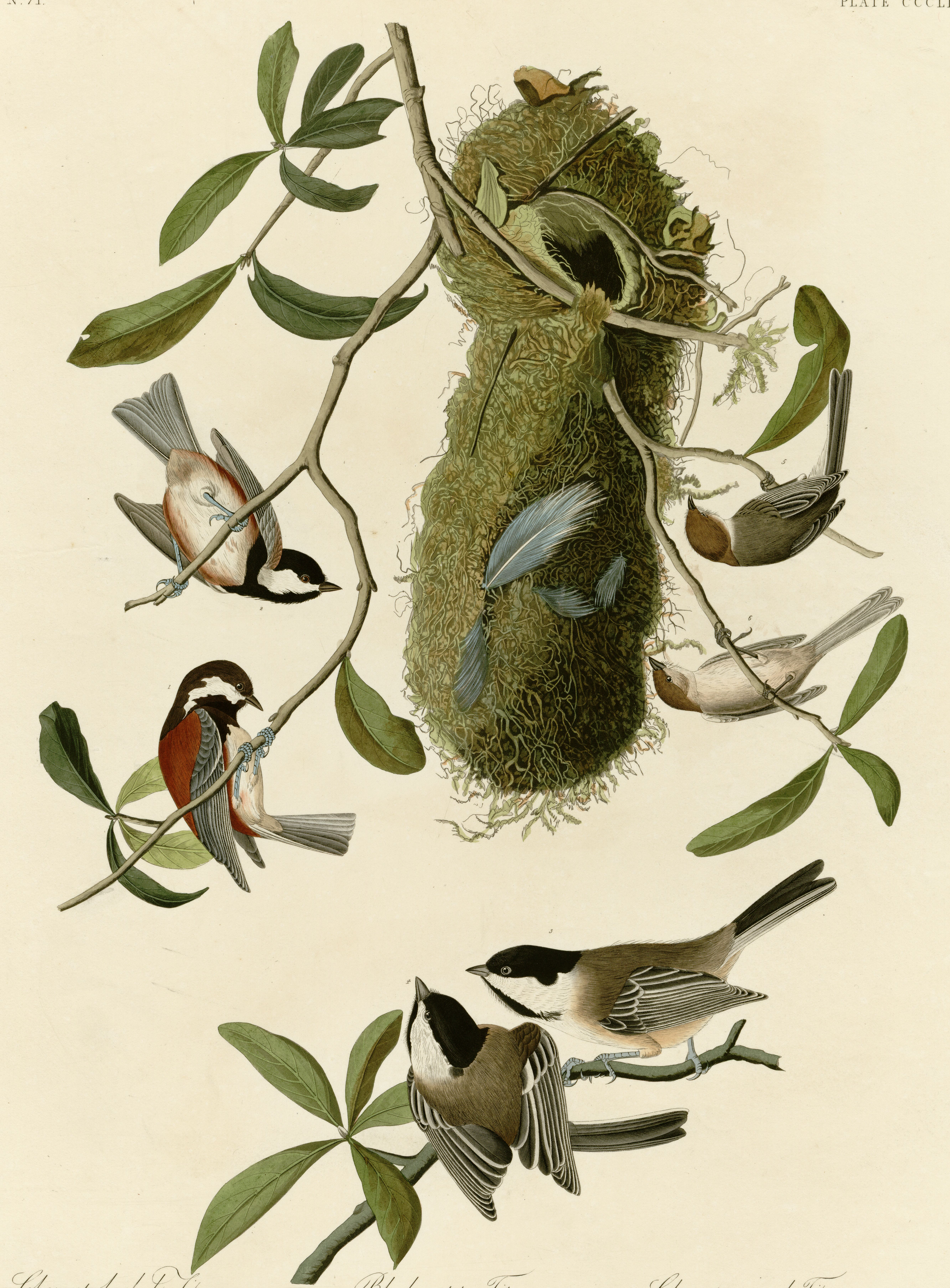
Three Paridae species
(Clockwise from top right: Psaltriparus minimus, Parus atricapillus, Parus rufescens)

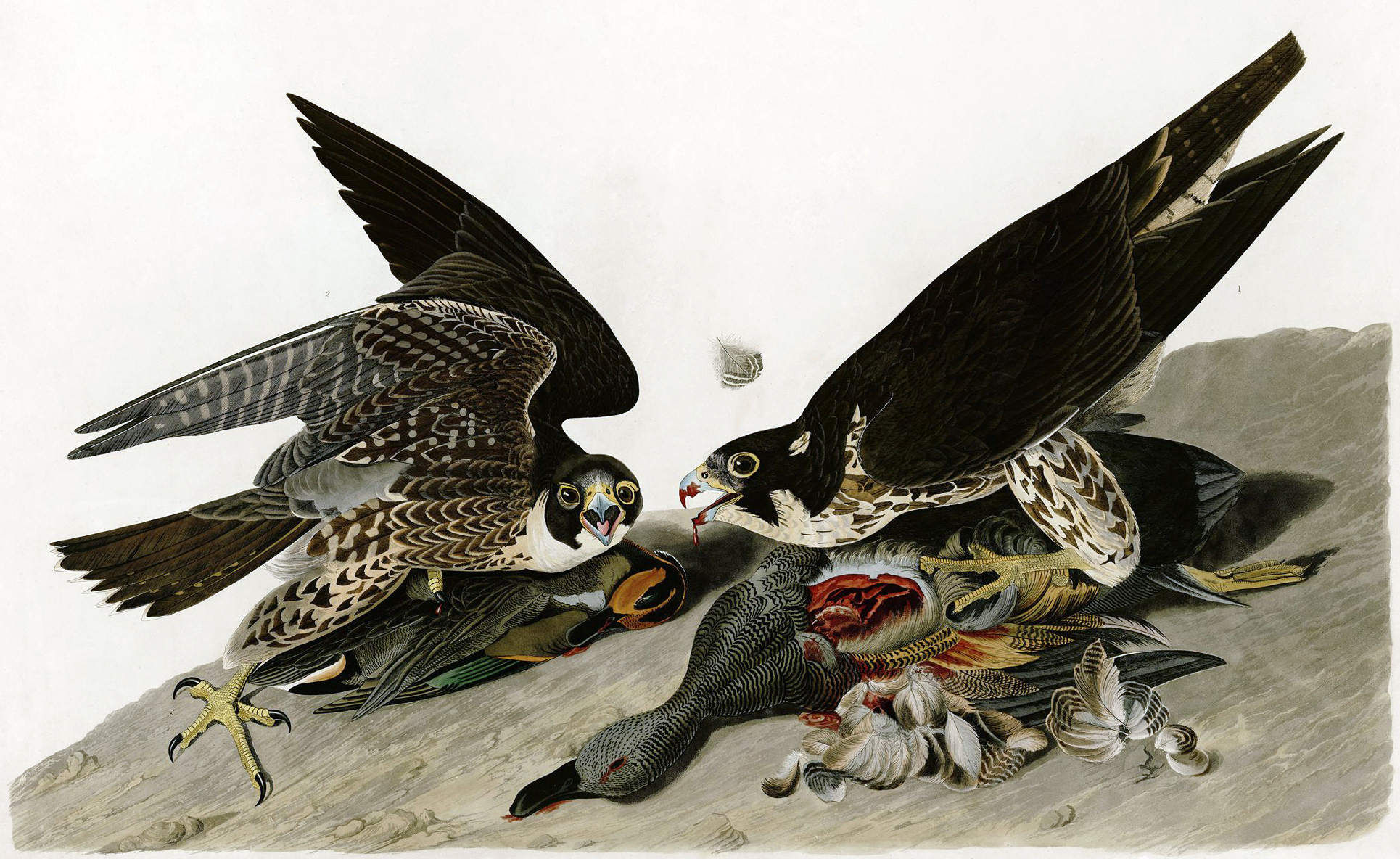
Peregrine falcon
(Falco peregrinus)

Barn owl
(now Tyto furcata)

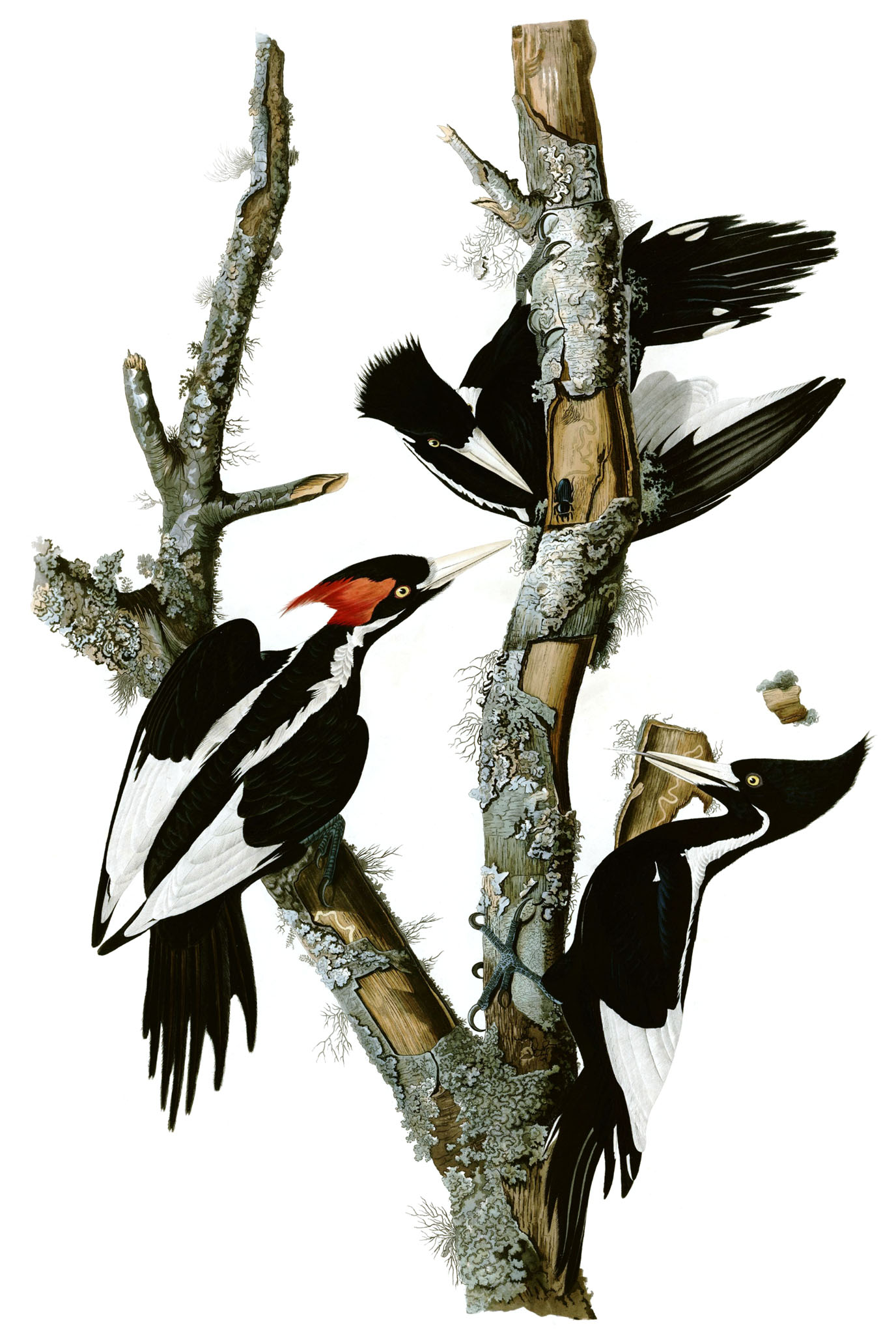
Ivory-billed woodpecker
(Campephilus principalis)
Possibly extinct

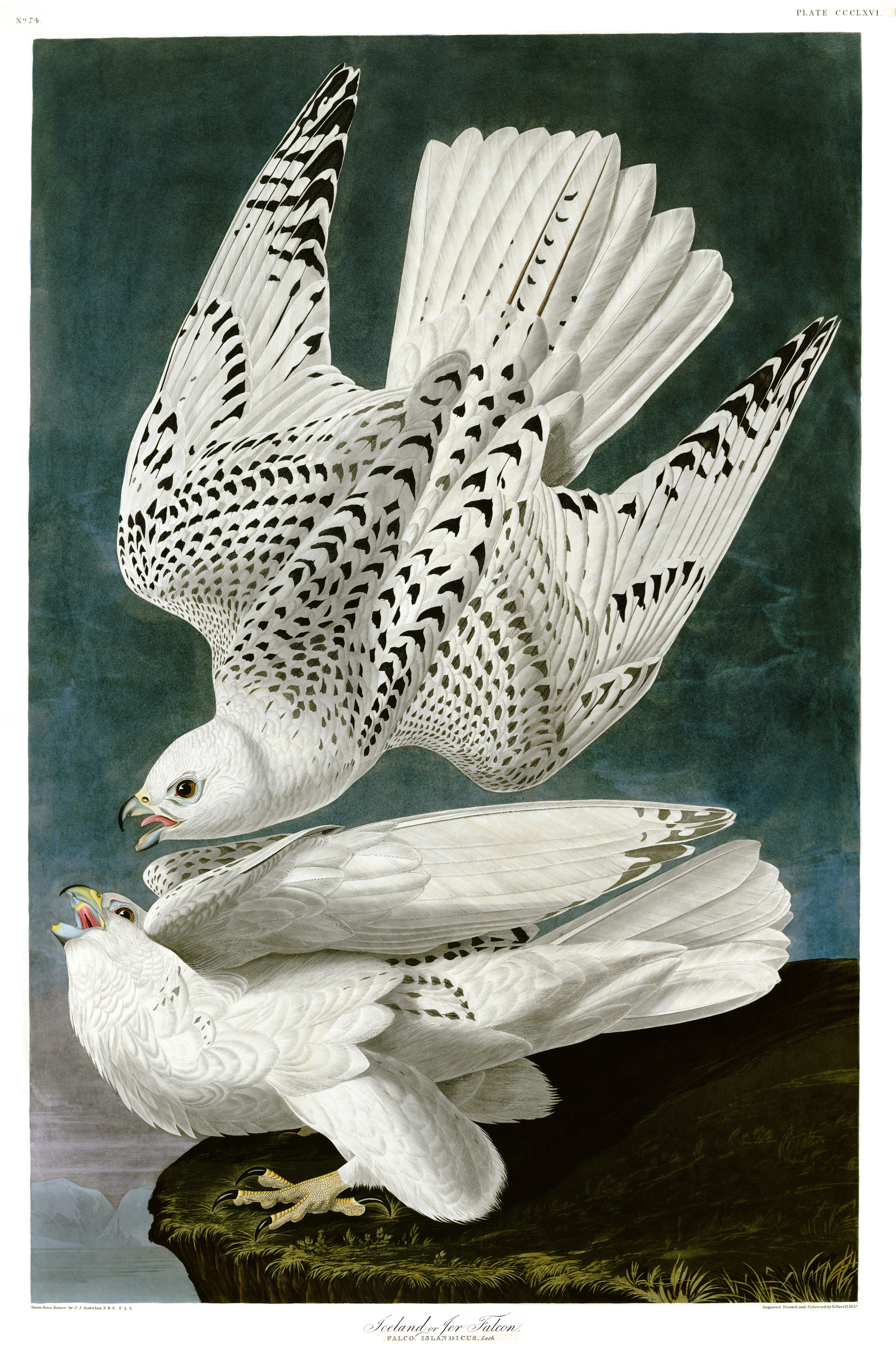
Gyrfalcon
(Falco rusticolus)

Rough-legged hawk
(Buteo lagopus)

Black-throated magpie-jay
(Calocitta colliei)

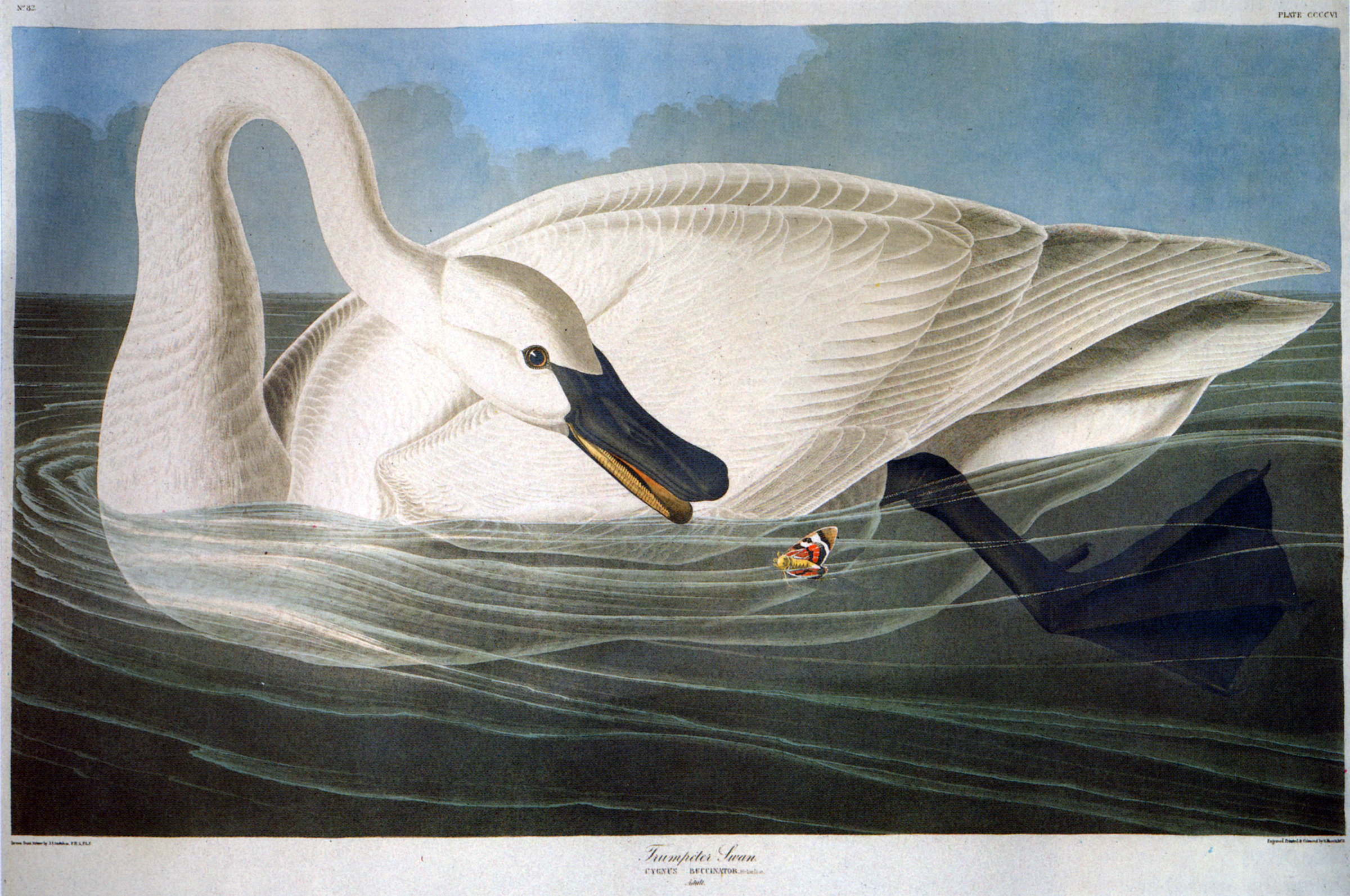
Trumpeter swan
(Cygnus buccinator)

Gallery of the rest of the plates.

== Textiles ==
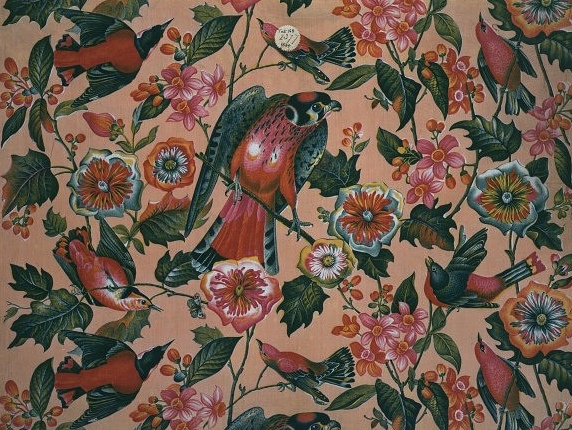
Furnishing fabric, from Lancashire, 1830s

In 1830s, immediately after the publication, several plates were used as a basis for the design of a series of roller-printed furnishing fabric, produced in Lancashire, United Kingdom.

== See also ==
- List of most expensive books and manuscripts
- The vivaparous quadrupeds of North America

== Bibliography ==
- Fries, Waldemar (2006). The Double Elephant Folio: The Story of Audubon's Birds of America. Amherst, MA: Zenaida Publishing. ISBN 0-977-08290-3
- Low, Susanne (2002). A Guide to Audubon's Birds of America. New Haven: William Reese Co. & Donald A. Heald. ISBN 0-939-22609-X
- Rhodes, Richard (2004). John James Audubon: The Making of an American. New York: Alfred A. Knopf. ISBN 0-375-41412-6
- Norman, Ana. "Audubon Collecting Guide: An Overview of the Antique Original Editions of Audubon’s Birds of America" Joel Oppenheimer, Inc. https://www.audubonart.com/audubon-collecting-guide/
- Norman, Ana. "What are the differences between an Audubon Havell engraving and Bien Lithograph? How to differentiate between the two Double-Elephant folio Editions" Joel Oppenheimer Gallery, JUNE 20, 2023. https://www.audubonart.com/what-are-the-differences-between-an-audubon-havell-engraving-and-bien-lithograph/
- Norman, Ana. "A Guide to the Watermarks and Paper Types Found in Audubon’s Havell edition of The Birds of America" Joel Oppenheimer Gallery, MAY 26, 2023. https://www.audubonart.com/a-guide-to-the-watermarks-and-paper-types-found-in-audubons-havell-edition-of-the-birds-of-america/
- Norman, Ana. "Audubon’s Miniature Folio – The Octavo Edition of Birds of America" Joel Oppenheimer Gallery, JUNE 21, 2023. https://www.audubonart.com/audubons-miniature-folio-the-octavo-edition-of-birds-of-america/
- Norman, Ana. "Extinct Species in Audubon’s Birds of America" Joel Oppenheimer Gallery, JUNE 15, 2023. https://www.audubonart.com/extinct-species-in-audubons-birds-of-america/
