= Sea eagle (disambiguation) =

A sea eagle is a bird of prey in the subfamily Haliaeetinae.

Sea eagle may also refer to:

== Birds ==
- Brahminy kite, also called red-backed sea eagle
- Osprey, known as the sea eagle chiefly in heraldry

== Aerospace ==
- Sea Eagle (missile), British, anti-ship missile
- Sea Eagle (WIG craft)
- Supermarine Sea Eagle, 1920s British passenger flying boat

== Sports ==
- Blackpool Sea Eagles, English rugby league football club
- Manly-Warringah Sea Eagles, Australian rugby league football club
- North Harbour Sea Eagles, New Zealand rugby league club
- Papakura Sea Eagles, New Zealand rugby league club
- Sunshine Coast Sea Eagles, Australian, professional rugby league football team
- Samoa national rugby union team

== Other ==
- HMS Sea Eagle, former, Royal Navy shore establishment near Derry, Northern Ireland
- Operation Sea Eagle, 1941, cancelled German supply operation in support of the Irish Republican Army
- The Sea Eagle, 1946 novel by James Aldridge
- SS Sea Eagle, ship. See USS Custer (APA-40)

== See also ==
- The Eagle of the Sea (film), a 1926 silent film
- Great Sea Eagle, an unknown bird published in Audubon but now unrecognized
- Fish eagle (disambiguation)
- Eagle (disambiguation)
- Sea (disambiguation)
