= John Woodhouse Audubon =

American painter

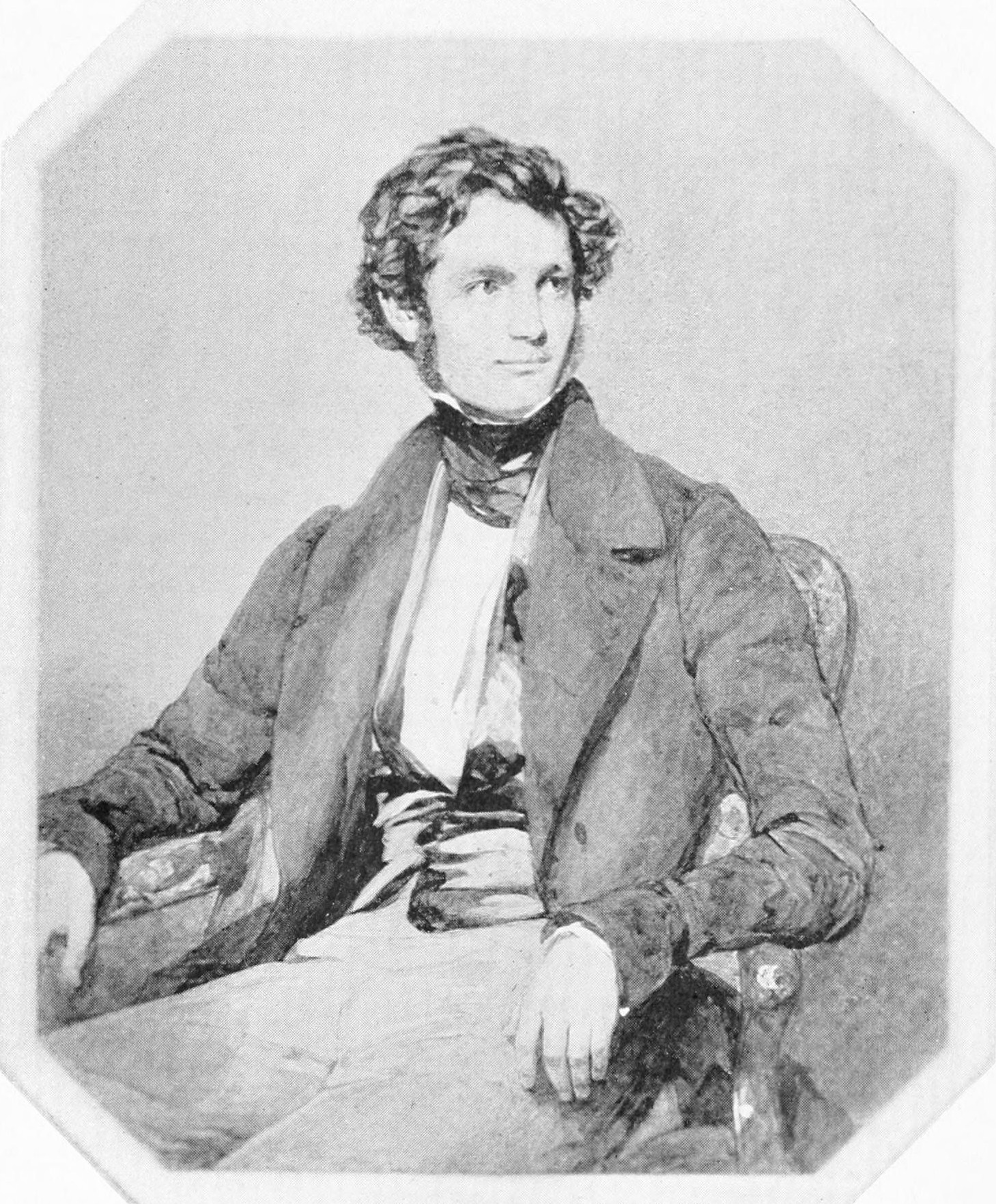
John Woodhouse Audubon; drawing after a miniature by F. Cruickshank (1838)

John Woodhouse Audubon (November 30, 1812 – February 21, 1862) was an American painter who was the second son of the ornithologist and painter John James Audubon. Like his father, he was primarily a painter of wildlife, but he also did some portraits and genre scenes of the westward migration.

== Biography ==
He grew up in Kentucky, Ohio and Louisiana, where he attended a school taught by his mother, Lucy. At an early age, he joined his father in his scientific pursuits, becoming an active traveler and gatherer of specimens. In 1833, they traveled to Labrador, after which his father wrote that "John has drawn a few Birds, as good as any I ever made, and in a few months I hope to give this department of my duty up to him altogether".

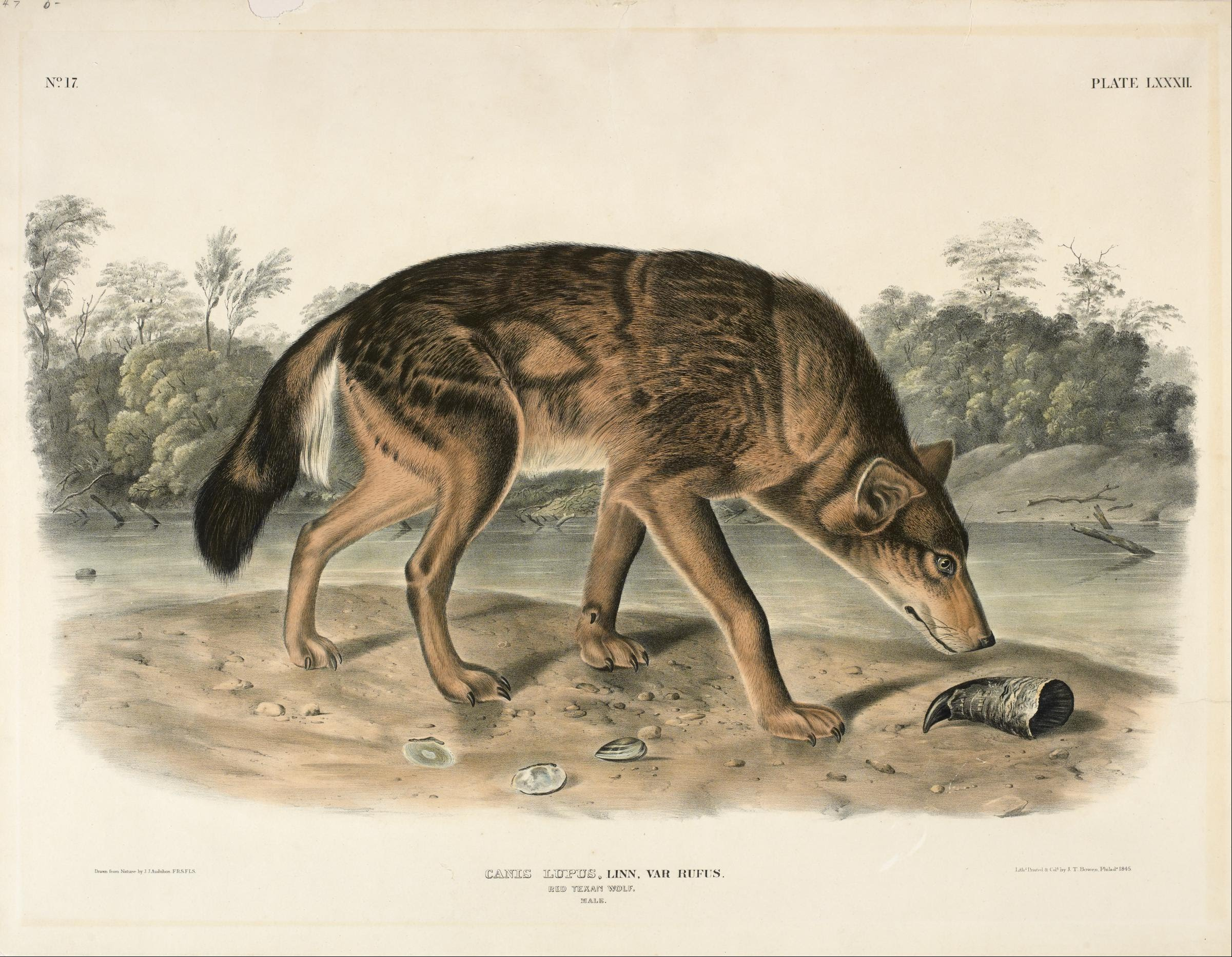
Texas red wolf (Canis lupus rufus)

The following year, the family was in London. Both John and his brother, Victor Gifford Audubon (1809–1860) studied painting and made copies of works. The year 1837 saw collecting expeditions in Florida and Texas; the latter conducted from a navy cutter that had been assigned to them by President Andrew Jackson. From 1839 to 1843, he was responsible for producing an octavo edition of The Birds of America, with an additional 65 plates (bringing the total to 500), reduced by means of the camera lucida and otherwise reworked.

Over the next few years, he created half the illustrations used for The Viviparous Quadrupeds of North America and managed the printing process. A folio size edition of The Birds of America began production in 1860, but never came to full fruition because of the Civil War. After 1839, he lived in New York City, in a house next to his father's in Audubon Park, Manhattan. Throughout the 1840s and 1850s, he exhibited animal paintings and portraits at the Apollo Association, the American Art Union and the National Academy of Design.

In 1849, he joined the California Company, financed by Ambrose Kingsland, among others, and led by Colonel Henry Livingston Webb (1795–1876), a veteran of the recent Mexican–American War. They got as far as the mouth of the Rio Grande (by ship), when they were hit by cholera and some of the company's money was stolen. At that point, Webb and a dozen others resigned and Audubon took over command. He led them across northern Mexico and Arizona and they arrived in San Diego eight months later. His paints and canvases were abandoned in the desert and he had to use his sketches for gun wadding. He spent seven months in California, but most of his watercolors were lost in transit when he shipped them to New York. Thirty-four unfinished sketches have been preserved at the Southwest Museum in Los Angeles.

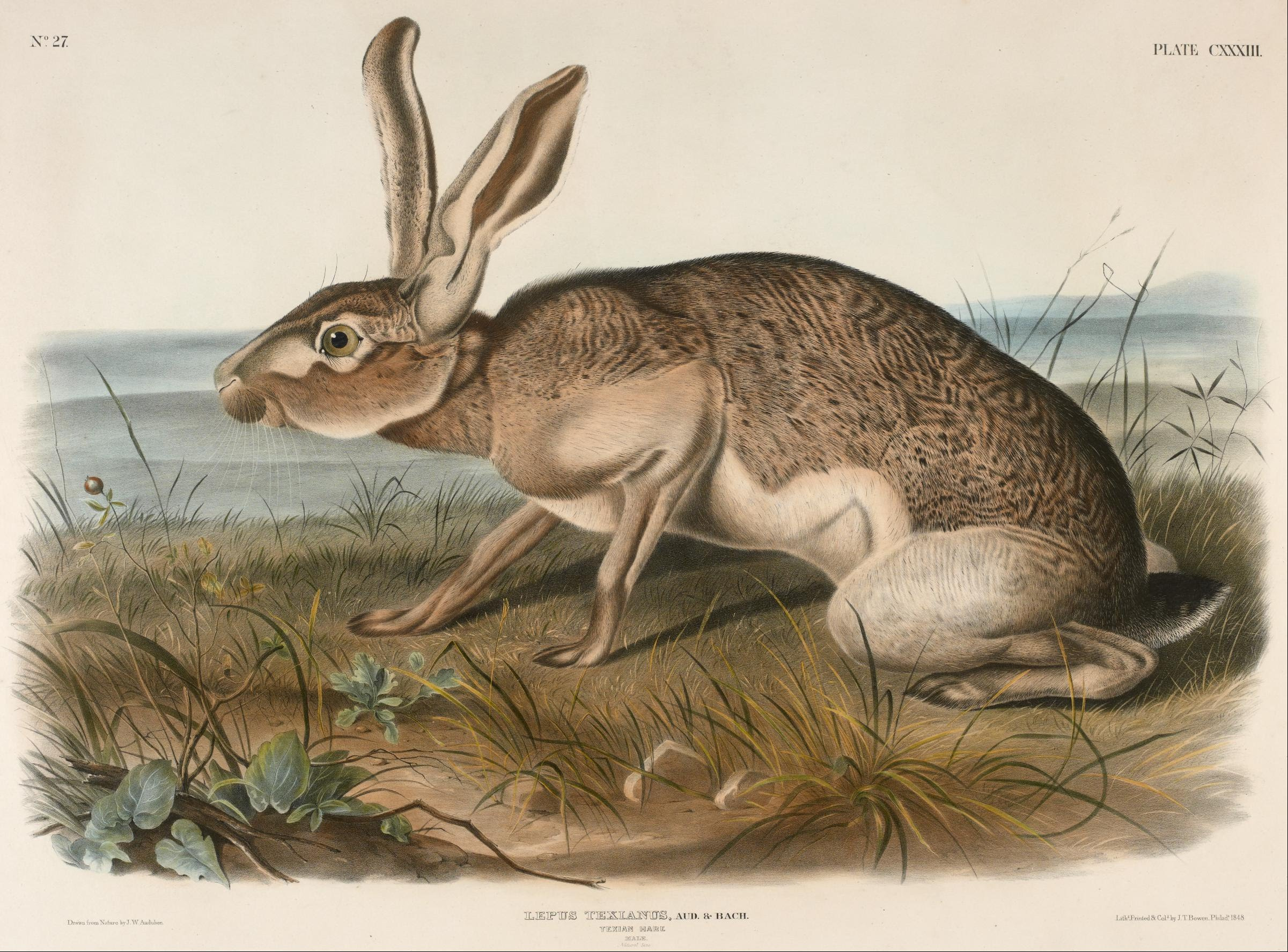
Texian hare (Lepus texianus)

He had nine children; two by his first wife, Maria Rebecca Bachman (1816–1840), daughter of John Bachman, who had been a collaborator on Quadrupeds, and seven by his second wife, Caroline Hall (1811–1899). One of his daughters with his second wife, Maria Rebecca Audubon (1843–1923), edited her grandfather's journals.
