= Bird of Washington =

Purported species of bird

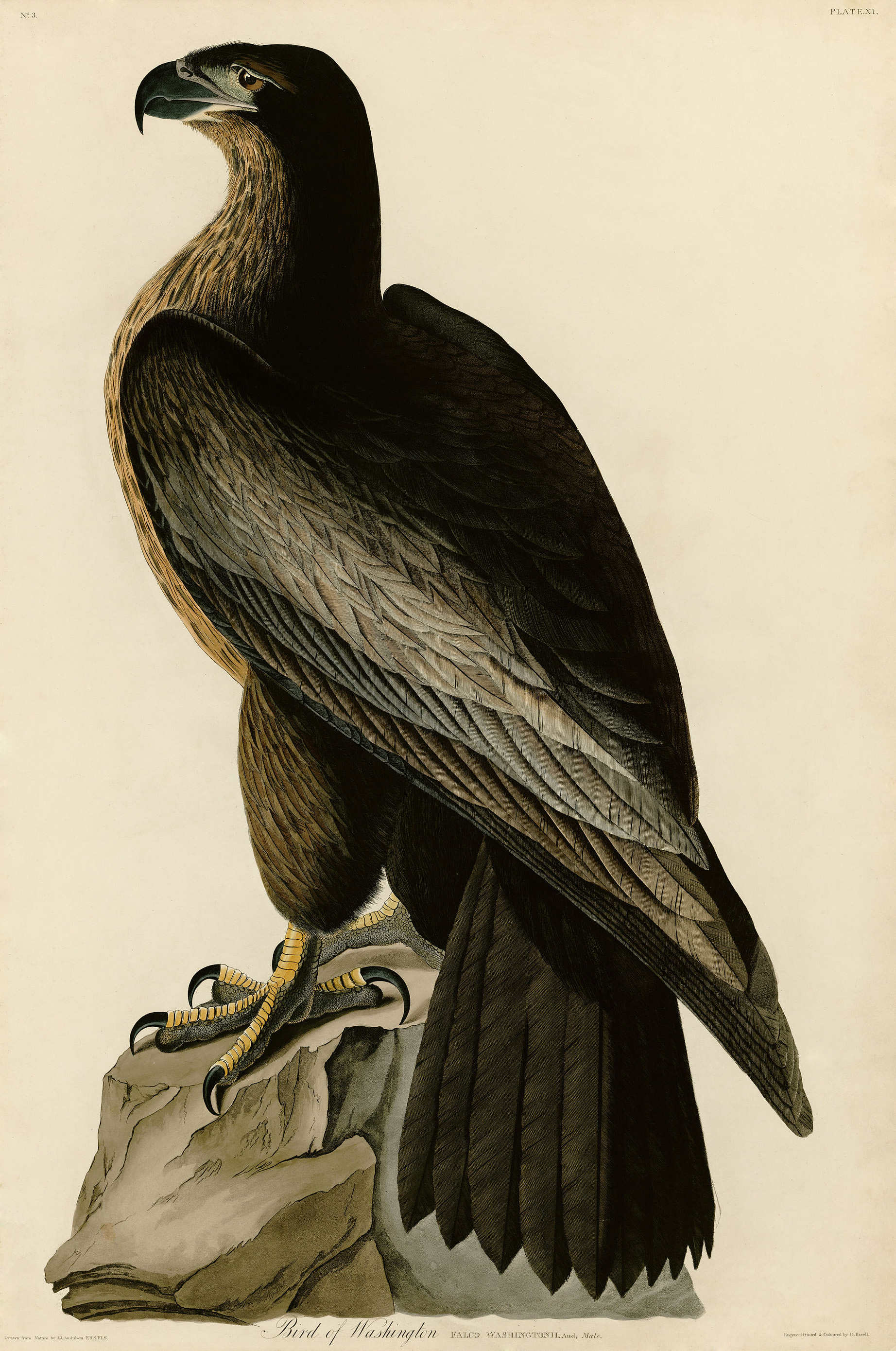
The Bird of Washington as it appeared on plate 11 of The Birds of America

The Bird of Washington, Washington Eagle, or Great Sea Eagle (Falco washingtonii, F. washingtoniensis, F. washingtonianus, or Haliaetus washingtoni) was a putative species of sea eagle which was claimed in 1826 and published by John James Audubon in his famous work The Birds of America. It was most notable for its reported wingspan of 10 feet 2 inches. The validity of this species has been questioned since 1870, and the consensus among modern ornithologists is that it was fabricated. Theories about its true nature include the following:

- It was an invention and that the picture was plagiarized from a picture of a golden eagle in Rees's Cyclopædia.
- It was a juvenile specimen, aberrant individual, or subspecies of bald eagle (Haliaeetus leucocephalus).
- It was actually a genuine species, but it was rare and became extinct after Audubon's sightings.

John James Audubon's painting of the bird was acquired by Sidney Dillon Ripley, and his family donated it to the Smithsonian American Art Museum in 1994.

Other illustrations by Audubon whose provenance is now disputed include western meadowlark, Harris's hawk and the red-winged blackbird.

== History ==
Audubon attributes his first sighting of the bird to the year 1814. He was on a trading voyage along the upper Mississippi River when his patroon pointed out an eagle flying overhead. The patroon describes how the bird was a rare sight, but not unheard of. He described their feeding habits: They usually fished in a manner similar to the Osprey (Pandion haliaetus), however when bodies of water had frozen over, they scavenged animal remains that hunters left behind. As the bird flew away, Audubon concluded that it must be a new species.

His second encounter occurred years later, this time along the Green River in Kentucky, where he observed an amount of excrement left on a high cliff. He concluded that it was from owls nesting on the cliff. A companion of his attributed it to a juvenile Bald Eagle (Haliaeetus leucocephalus), but Audubon denied this, stating that Bald Eagles only nested in trees, not cliffs. The companion reported additional differences between Bald Eagles and the bird he had seen, such as hunting and nesting behaviors. Audubon proceeded to wait several hours until seeing the bird itself, where it reportedly fed its young. The larger female of the pair then appeared. Then, the female discovered Audubon and his companions.

Audubon described several other brief sightings of the bird, but none as detailed as these two. He also reported shooting and handling various specimens.
