= Maria Martin =

American artist (1796–1863)

Maria Martin Bachman
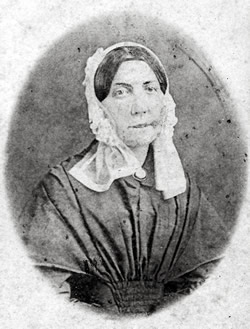
- Maria Martin
- Born: 6 July 1796; Charleston, South Carolina
- Died: 27 December 1863 (aged 67); Columbia, South Carolina
- Occupations: Naturalist, scientific illustrator
- Known for: Scientific illustration of flora and insects, particularly for John James Audubon's Birds of America

Maria (/mɝˈaɪə/ mah-RYE-uh) Martin Bachman (3 July 1796 – 27 December 1863) of Charleston, South Carolina, was an American watercolor painter and scientific illustrator. She contributed many of the background paintings for John James Audubon's The Birds of America (1831–39) and Viviparous Quadrupeds of North America (1845–48). Bachman was the only woman of the three principal assistants that Audubon employed at the time.

== Early life ==
Maria Martin Bachman was born July 6, 1796, in Charleston, South Carolina just two and half weeks after the “Great Fire of 1796” that destroyed many of the buildings and houses in the center of the city. Martin was the youngest of the four surviving children (Eliza, Harriet, and Jane) born to Jacob and Rebecca Martin, well-to-do mantua makers that owned two houses with household slaves. Raised in a Lutheran household, Maria Martin and her sisters were raised to be “God fearing, responsible adults” and trained “in the liberal arts and honourable manners”.

Martin's school records have not been discovered, but she had knowledge of literature, French, and German, while also being interested in music, art, and natural science. Martin's mother Rebecca Martin had learned from her second marriage that her husband could easily take legal ownership of her property and finances. To avoid losing her property to a future husband, Rebecca had a “Marriage Settlement” drawn before marrying Jacob Martin, her third husband. When Martin was 17 years old her father Jacob left the family to relocate to Philadelphia, Pennsylvania with his mistress. Her mother's foresight allowed Rebecca to retain ownership of her houses and four slaves when her husband left.

== Career ==
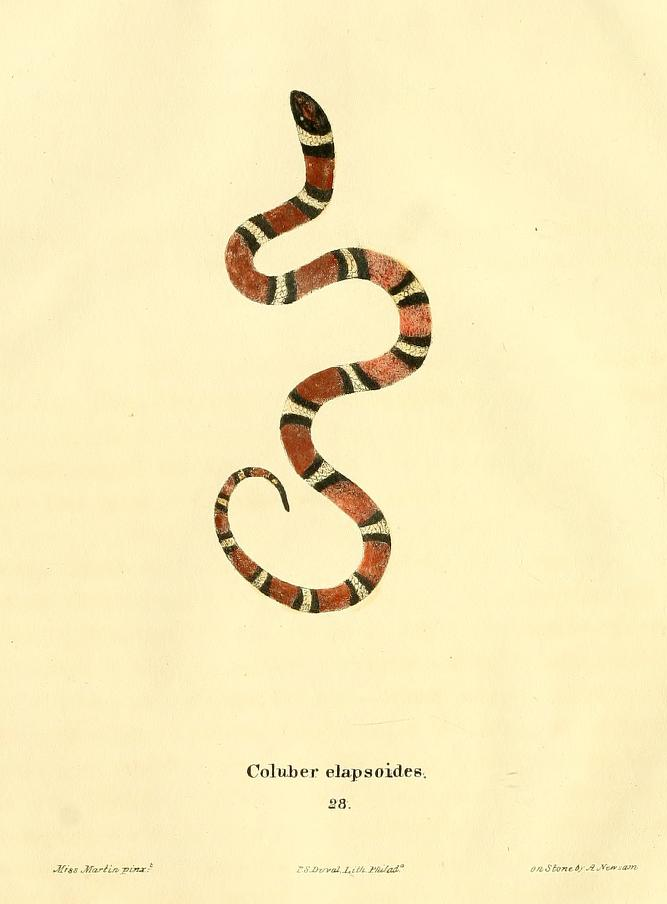
Illustration of Coluber elapsoides by Maria Martin as published in North American Herpetology

Martin accompanied her brother-in-law, John Bachman, on several field excursions, including one trip to Niagara Falls, and learned how to make scientific descriptions and drawings of plants and animals. Martin had also been talented in the making of botanical sketches. In finding out about this talent, Audubon had introduced Martin to new methods, techniques and materials of posing birds, which would soon be added to Martin's botanical art pieces. They had soon created a work of art known as "The Birds of America". In the 1830s Audubon was a guest at the Bachman household during a trip to study bird species in the South. During his stay, Audubon encouraged Martin in her drawing and tutored her in natural illustration. After realizing Martin's artistic talent, Audubon supplied her with paint brushes and other art materials, and advice on how to use them to develop her talents. He spoke highly of her work in letters to John Bachman, stating in one letter "Miss Martin, with her superior talents, assists us greatly in the way of drawing; the insects she has drawn are, perhaps, the best I've seen."

Audubon went on to ask Martin to assist with paintings for his definitive book The Birds of America. Over the course of five years, Martin assisted on volumes 2 and 4 the book. She was not paid for this work. Audubon credited Martin with nine illustrations, but it is thought that she contributed to at least 30. Martin also provided illustrations to John Edwards Holbrook for publication in his work North American Herpetology.

Martin also assisted John Bachman in editing The Viviparous Quadrupeds of North America, a collaboration between Bachman and Audubon, and later Audubon's son John Woodhouse Audubon. The importance of her contribution to Quadrupeds is discussed in a letter from John Bachman to John J. Audubon, saying Martin "knocks to the right and left with your articles and mine--lops off, corrects, criticizes, abuses and praises by turn" and "she does wonders".

John J. Audubon named a variety of the hairy woodpecker (Picus martinae) Maria's Woodpecker, in Martin's honor.

== Personal life ==
In 1845, Martin moved into Reverend John and Harriet Bachman's house to help her sister Harriet raise her nine surviving children. Harriet was weakened emotionally and physically from consumption and the 14 pregnancies she brought to term between 1816 and 1832. Martin was placed in charge of overseeing the religious and moral education of her nieces and nephews. Martin dedicated her life to the Bachman family ensuring the household maintained order while her sister remained bedridden and dying from consumption.

Two years after Martin joined the Bachman family, Harriet died and left Martin the de facto matriarch of the household. Within two years of living as aunt to the children and sister-in-law to Reverend Bachman, Martin drafted her own marriage settlement and married her brother-in-law Reverend John Bachman whom she remained dedicated wife and business partner throughout her life. She left Charleston for Columbia, South Carolina in 1861 due to the Civil War, and remained there until her death in 1863.

== Exhibitions ==
=== New-York Historical Society Museum & Library ===
Audubon’s Aviary: The Complete Flock is an exhibition at the New-York Historical Society featuring all 435 of Audubon's Birds of America prints. The website released an article titled "Meet Audubon’s Assistant Painter: Maria Martin Bachman", acknowledging Maria Martin's contributions to the work. The article states that Audubon acknowledged Martin's contributions to nine of the Birds of America prints, but it is thought she collaborated on over 30 of the prints.

=== The Charleston Museum ===
Martin is highlighted in the Charleston Museum's exhibition Preserving Nature's Beauty: The Art of Herbaria. This exhibition displays some Audubon double-elephant-folio prints, as well as her personal work that was not included in Birds of America. The website acknowledges Martin as being known for her paintings of the detailed natural habitats in Audubon's works, as well as her "combination of scientific accuracy and artistic judgement." The exhibition ran from September 14, 2018, to June 23, 2019, in the Charleston Museum lobby.

== Gallery ==
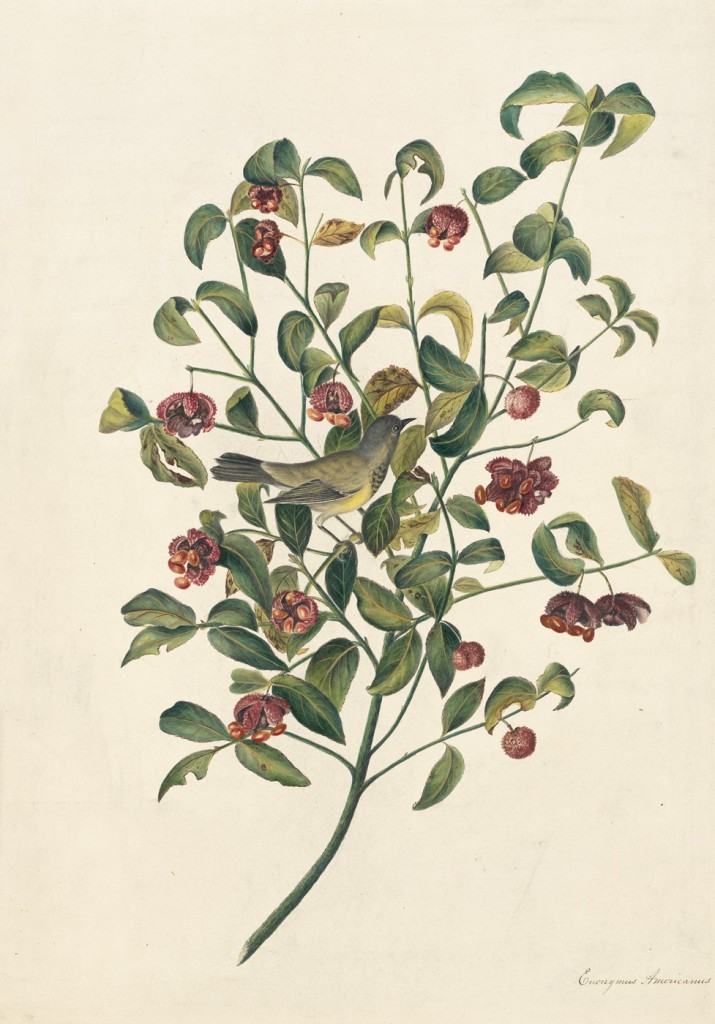
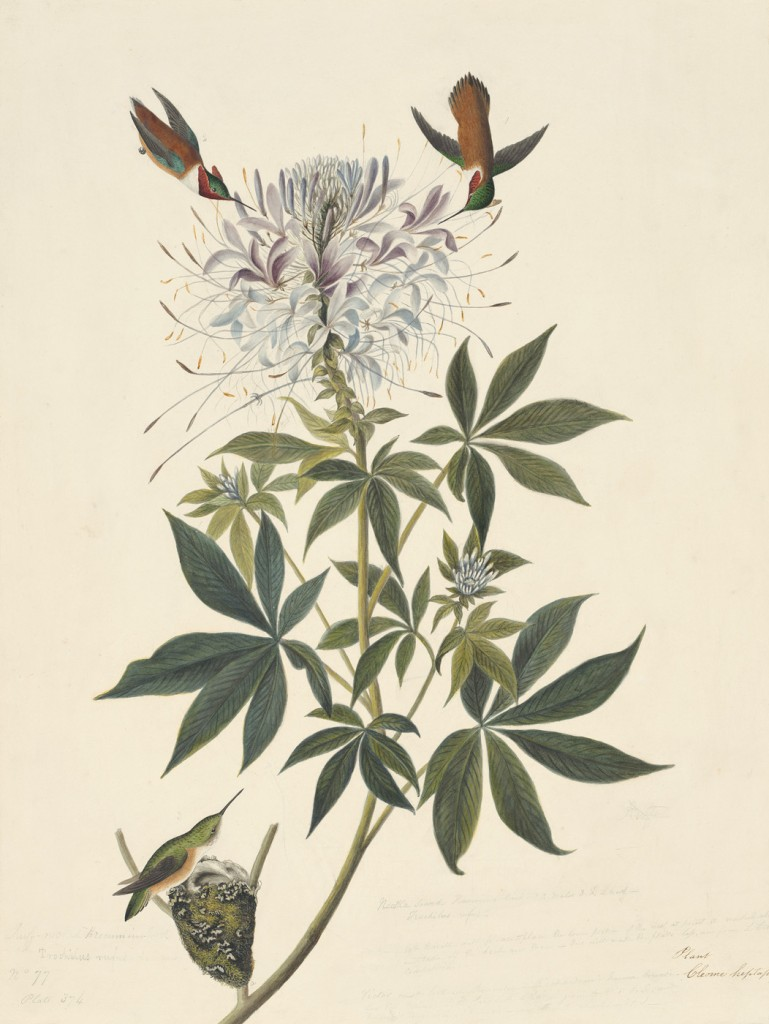
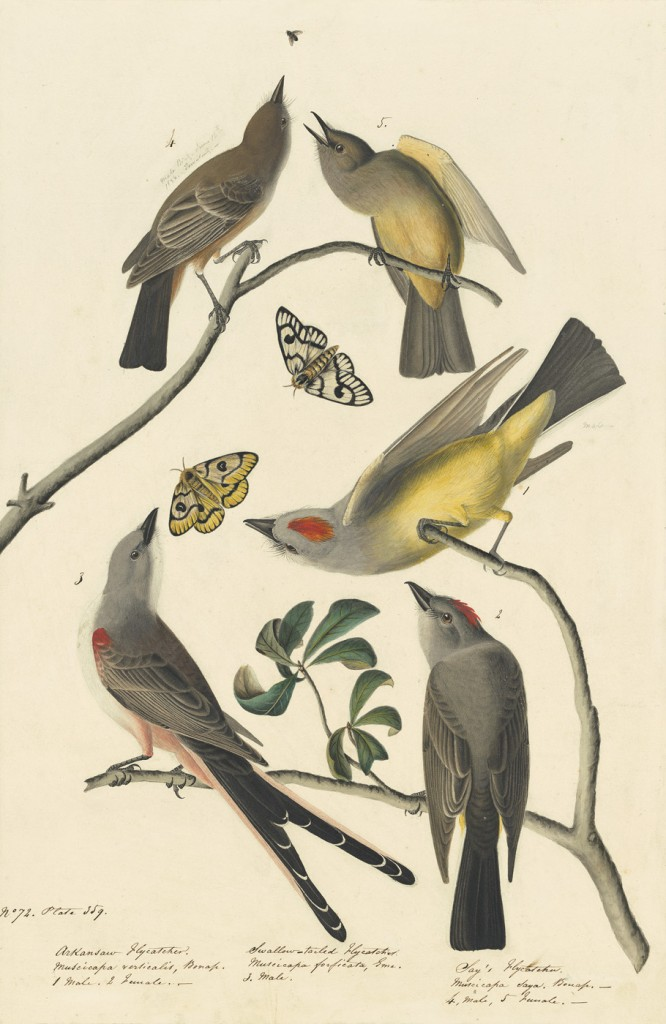
