= John Bachman =

American minister, social activist and naturalist (1790-1874)

The Reverend John Bachman
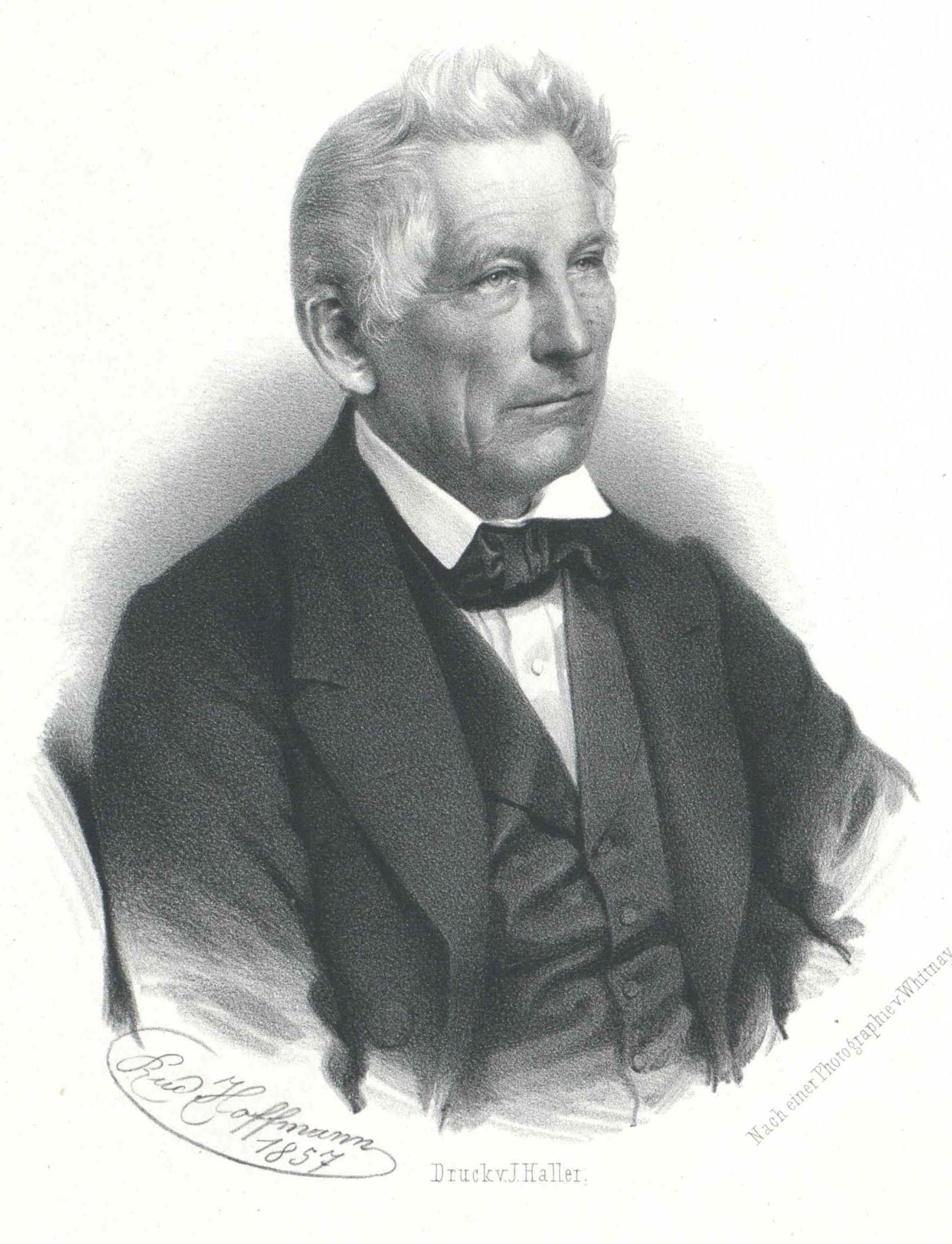
- Born: February 4, 1790; New York
- Died: February 24, 1874 (aged 84); Charleston, South Carolina
- Spouse: Maria Martin Bachman
- Church: Pennsylvania Ministerium; Lutheran Synod of South Carolina
- Congregations served: St. John's Lutheran Church in Charleston, South Carolina
- Title: Ordained pastor

John Bachman (/ˈbækmən/ BAK-mən; February 4, 1790 – February 24, 1874) was an American Lutheran minister, social activist and naturalist who collaborated with John James Audubon to produce Viviparous Quadrupeds of North America and whose writings, particularly Unity of the Human Race, were influential in the development of the theory of evolution. He was married to the painter Maria Martin. Several species of animals are named in his honor.

== Life ==
Bachman served the same Charleston, South Carolina church as pastor for 56 years but still found time to conduct natural history studies that caught the attention of noted bird artist John James Audubon and eminent scientists in England, Europe, and beyond. He was a proponent of secular and religious education and helped found Newberry College and the Lutheran Theological Southern Seminary, as well as the South Carolina Lutheran Synod.

He was elected an Associate Fellow of the American Academy of Arts and Sciences in 1845.

Bachman was a social reformer who ministered to African-American slaves as well as white Southerners, and who used his knowledge of natural history to become one of the first writers to argue scientifically that blacks and whites are the same species. His accomplishments span a lifetime punctuated by the unrest of the American Civil War—a conflict that caused him great consternation and may have brought about his premature death due to injuries suffered at the hands of Union soldiers.

== Legacy ==
Bachman's hare, Bachman's sparrow, and Bachman's warbler are named in his honor. The latter, now declared extinct, was recorded in 1832 by Bachman, who presented study skins and descriptions to his friend and collaborator, John James Audubon. Audubon never saw the bird alive but named it in honor of Bachman. In 1816, Bachman recorded the marsh rice rat.

Despite his achievements, Bachman is usually overlooked in accounts of important figures from the 19th century, and he is seldom mentioned in history courses, even in South Carolina schools. To improve public understanding of John Bachman's accomplishments, the Newberry College Alumni Association held a major international John Bachman Symposium in April 2006, the beginning of the college's 150th anniversary celebration. "Nature, God, and Social Reform in the Old South: The Life and Work of the Rev. John Bachman" was attended by academics, students, and the general public.

== Commentary on Bachman ==
An 1854 article "The Southern Apostasy", in The New Englander, declares the following: "The Rev. Dr. Bachman, Pastor of a Lutheran Congregation in Charleston, is a man of eminent attainments in science, and particularly in the department of Natural History. ... Observe then how he exhibits the bearing of his subject on the "peculiar institutions" of the Southern States:"

... That the negro will remain as he is, unless his form is changed by an amalgamation, which latter is revolting to us. That his intellect, although underrated, is greatly inferior to that of the Caucasian, and that he is, therefore, as far as our experience goes, incapable of self-government. That he is thrown on our protection. That our defense of slavery is contained in the Holy Scriptures. That the Scriptures teach the rights and duties of masters to rule their servants with justice and kindness, and enjoin the obedience of servants.

Leonard Woolsey Bacon writes in A History of American Christianity:

The eminent leader among the Lutheran clergy, the Rev. Dr. Bachman, of Charleston, referred "that unexampled unanimity of sentiment that now exists in the whole South on the subject of slavery" to the confidence felt by the religious public in the Bible defense of slavery as set forth by clergymen and laymen in sermons and pamphlets and speeches in Congress.

In a footnote in the second edition of The Races of Men, Robert Knox wrote as follows:

I have read with horror the ravings of Mr. John Bachman, a slave-owning parson. The expression "whited sepulchre" must have been invented for the class to which he belongs. They are very numerous in England.

== Name in zoology ==
The standard author abbreviation Bachman is used to indicate this person as the author when citing a zoological name.

== Bibliography ==
- Bachman, John (1850), The doctrine of the unity of the human race examined on the principles of science, Charleston, S.C.: C. Canning. LC control no. 05029882.
- Johnson, Rossiter, ed. (1906). "Bachman, John". The Biographical Dictionary of America. Vol. 1. Boston: American Biographical Society. p. 174.
- Desmond, Adrian; Moore, James (2009), Darwin's Sacred Cause: how a hatred of slavery shaped Darwin's views on human evolution, Houghton Mifflin Harcourt. ISBN 978-0-547-05526-8

== See also ==
- Taxa named by John Bachman
