= Audubon (disambiguation) =

Audubon, the National Audubon Society, is an American environmental organization.

Audubon may also refer to:

== People ==
- Audubon (surname)

== Places in the United States ==
- Audubon, Georgia, an unincorporated community
- Audubon, Iowa, city
- Audubon, Louisville, Kentucky, neighborhood
- Audubon, New Orleans, Louisiana, neighborhood
- Audubon, Minnesota, city
- Audubon, New Jersey, borough
- Audubon, Pennsylvania, census-designated place
- Audubon Canyon, California
- Audubon County, Iowa
- Audubon Township, Montgomery County, Illinois

=== Roads ===
- Audubon Avenue, Manhattan, New York City
- Audubon Parkway, Kentucky
- Audubon Parkway, an exit off of Interstate 990 in Amherst, New York

== Nature organizations ==
- Audubon International, environmental management practices education organization based in New York
- Audubon Nature Institute, New Orleans, Louisiana, including:
  - Audubon Butterfly Garden and Insectarium
  - Audubon Zoo
- Massachusetts Audubon Society
- Trinity River Audubon Center, Dallas, Texas
- Audubon Park (disambiguation)

== Other ==
- 75564 Audubon, an asteroid
- Audubon (book), a biography of John James Audubon
- Audubon (film), a 2017 documentary about John James Audubon
- Audubon (magazine), published by the National Audubon Society
- Audubon State Historic Site, Louisiana
- Audubon (Scott County, Kentucky), house
- Audubon Quartet, former string quartet

== See also ==
- Autobahn (disambiguation)
