= Portmanteau =

Word consisting of two words

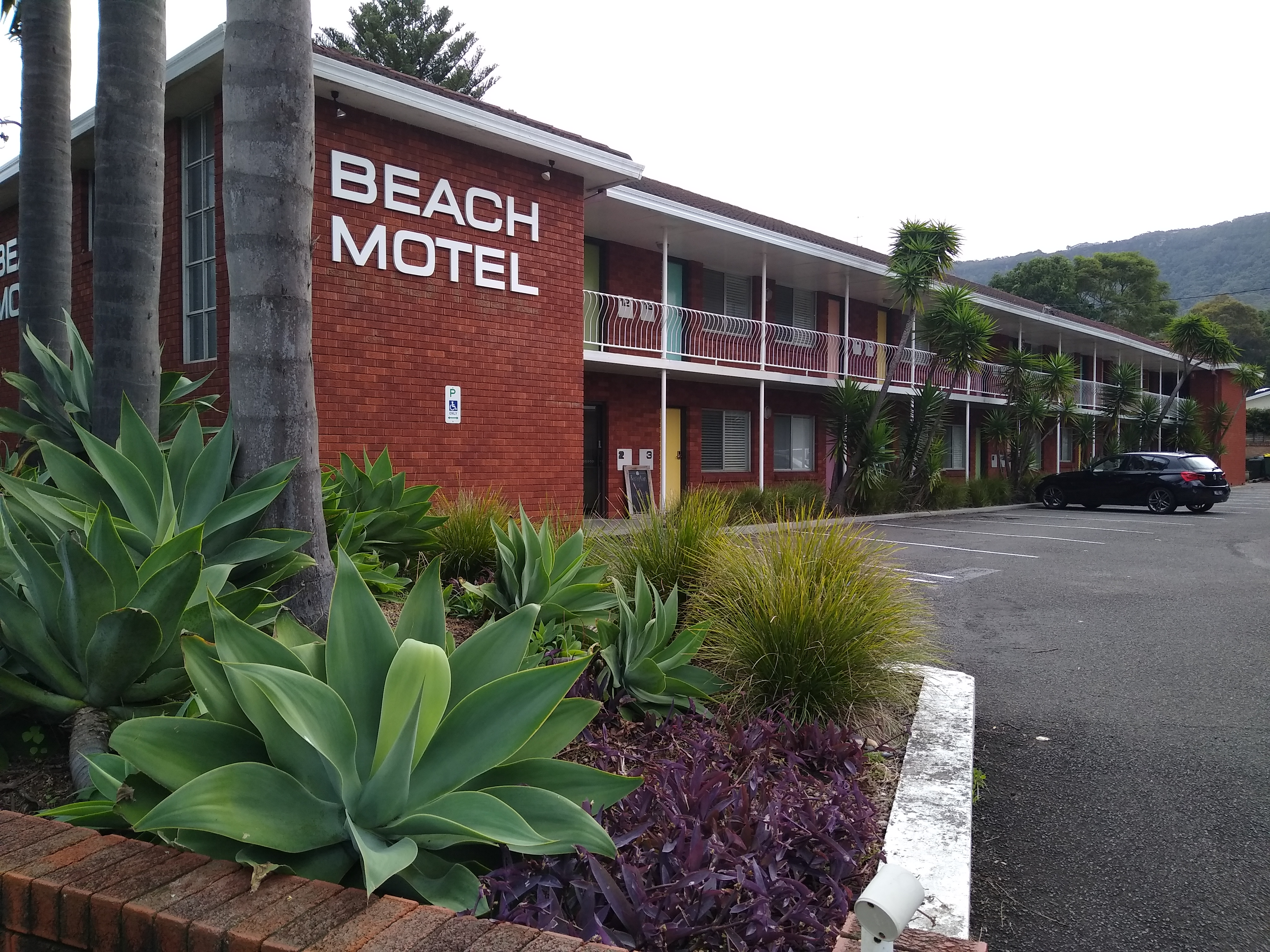
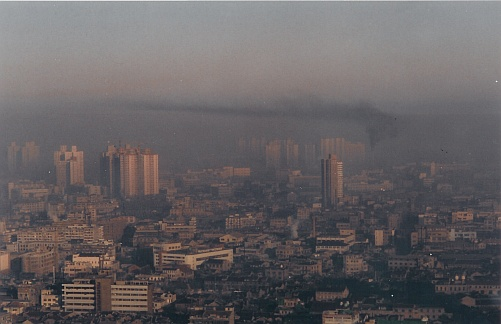
A motel (top) and smog (bottom), the names of which are examples of blend words in English (motor + hotel, smoke + fog)

In literary studies, a portmanteau, (Note: The term portmanteau is prononunced /pɔːrtˈmæntoʊ/ port-MAN-toh or /ˌpɔːr(t)mænˈtoʊ/ POR(T)-man-TOH; the plural is portmanteaus or portmanteaux.) also known in linguistics and lexicography as a blend word, a lexical blend, or simply a blend, is a word formed by combining the meanings and parts of the sounds of two or more words. English examples include smog, coined by blending smoke and fog, and motel, blending motor (or motorist) and hotel. The term "portmanteau", derived from the French porte-manteau, literally is a two-part piece of luggage that was first applied metaphorically in Lewis Carroll's Through the Looking-Glass (1871) to describe the combination of words.

== Similar concepts ==
A blend is similar to but distinct from a contraction. On one hand, mainstream blends tend to be formed at a particular historical moment followed by a rapid rise in popularity. On the other hand, contractions are formed by the gradual drifting together of words over time due to the words commonly appearing together in sequence, such as do not naturally becoming don't (phonologically, /duː nɒt/ becoming /doʊnt/); however, don't is also an example of a portmanteau morph.

A blend also differs from a compound, which fully preserves the stems of the original words. The British lecturer Valerie Adams's 1973 Introduction to Modern English Word-Formation explains that "In words such as motel..., hotel is represented by various shorter substitutes – ‑otel... – which I shall call splinters. Words containing splinters I shall call blends". (Note: Adams attributes the term splinter to J. M. Berman, "Contribution on blending," Zeitschrift für Anglistik und Amerikanistik 9 (1961), pp. 278–281.) Thus, at least one of the parts of a blend, strictly speaking, is not a complete morpheme, but instead a mere splinter or leftover word fragment. For instance, starfish is a compound, not a blend, of star and fish, as it includes both words in full. However, if it were called a "stish" or a "starsh", it would be a blend. Furthermore, when blends are formed by shortening established compounds or phrases, they can be considered clipped compounds, such as romcom for romantic comedy.

Contamination, in some languages, refers to a subset of blends, where the words combined are synonyms or have similar meanings. This kind of blend can be deliberate or accidental.

== Classification ==
Blends of two or more words may be classified from each of three viewpoints: morphotactic, morphonological, and morphosemantic.

=== Morphotactic classification ===
Blends may be classified morphotactically into two kinds: total and partial.

==== Total blends ====
In a total blend, each of the words creating the blend is reduced to a mere splinter. Some linguists limit blends to these (perhaps with additional conditions): for example, Ingo Plag considers "proper blends" to be total blends that semantically are coordinate, the remainder being "shortened compounds".

Commonly for English blends, the beginning of one word is followed by the end of another:

- breakfast + lunch ⇒ brunch (Note: Example provided by Elisa Mattiello's chapter "Blends" (of Extra-grammatical Morphology in English: Abbreviations, Blends, Reduplicatives, and Related Phenomena, Berlin: De Gruyter Mouton, 2013) of a blend of this kind.)
- low-key + genuinely ⇒ lowkenuinely
- motor + hotel ⇒ motel

Much less commonly in English, the beginning of one word may be followed by the beginning of another:

- teleprinter + exchange ⇒ telex
- American + Indian ⇒ Amerind
- microcomputer + software ⇒ Microsoft

Some linguists do not regard beginning+beginning concatenations as blends, instead calling them complex clippings, clipping compounds or clipped compounds.

Unusually in English, the end of one word may be followed by the end of another:

- Red Bull + margarita ⇒ bullgarita
- Hello Kitty + delicious ⇒ kittylicious

A splinter of one word may replace part of another, as in two coined by Lewis Carroll in "Jabberwocky":

- chuckle + snort ⇒ chortle
- slimy + lithe ⇒ slithy

They are sometimes termed intercalative blends; these words are among the original "portmanteaus" for which this meaning of the word was created.

==== Partial blends ====
In a partial blend, one entire word is concatenated with a splinter from another. Some linguists do not recognize these as blends.

An entire word may be followed by a splinter:

- fan + magazine ⇒ fanzine (Note: Example provided by Elisa Mattiello's chapter "Blends" (of Extra-grammatical Morphology in English: Abbreviations, Blends, Reduplicatives, and Related Phenomena, Berlin: De Gruyter Mouton, 2013) of a blend of this kind. (Etymologically, fan is a clipping of fanatic; but it has since become lexicalized.))
- dumb + confound ⇒ dumbfound

A splinter may be followed by an entire word:

- Brad + Angelina ⇒ Brangelina
- American + Indian ⇒ Amerindian

An entire word may replace part of another:

- adorable + dork ⇒ adorkable
- disgusting + gross ⇒ disgrossting

These have also been called sandwich words, and classed among intercalative blends.

(When two words are combined in their entirety, the result is considered a compound word rather than a blend. For example, bagpipe is a compound, not a blend, of bag and pipe.)

=== Morphological classification ===
Morphologically, blends fall into two kinds: overlapping and non-overlapping.

==== Overlapping blends ====
Overlapping blends are those for which the ingredients' consonants, vowels or even syllables overlap to some extent. The overlap can be of different kinds. These are also called haplologic blends.

There may be an overlap that is both phonological and orthographic, but with no other shortening:

- anecdote + dotage ⇒ anecdotage
- pal + alimony ⇒ palimony

The overlap may be both phonological and orthographic, and with some additional shortening to at least one of the ingredients:

- California + fornication ⇒ Californication (Note: Elisa Mattiello, "Lexical index." Appendix (pp. 287–329) to Extra-grammatical Morphology in English: Abbreviations, Blends, Reduplicatives, and Related Phenomena (Berlin: De Gruyter Mouton, 2013; doi:10.1515/9783110295399; ISBN 978-3-11-029539-9).)
- picture + dictionary ⇒ pictionary

Such an overlap may be discontinuous:

- politician + pollution ⇒ pollutician (Note: Example provided by Elisa Mattiello's chapter "Blends" (of Extra-grammatical Morphology in English: Abbreviations, Blends, Reduplicatives, and Related Phenomena, Berlin: De Gruyter Mouton, 2013) of a blend of this kind, slightly amended.)
- beef + buffalo ⇒ beefalo

These are also termed imperfect blends.

It can occur with three components:

- camisade + cannibalism + ballistics ⇒ camibalistics (Note: Example provided by Mattiello of a blend of this kind. The word is found in Finnegans Wake; Mattiello credits Almuth Grésillon, La règle et le monstre: Le mot-valise. Interrogations sur la langue, à partir d'un corpus de Heinrich Heine (Tübingen: Max Niemeyer, 1984), 15, for bringing it to her attention.)
- meander + Neanderthal + tale ⇒ meandertale

The phonological overlap need not also be orthographic:

- back + acronym ⇒ backronym
- war + orgasm ⇒ wargasm

If the phonological but non-orthographic overlap encompasses the whole of the shorter ingredient, as in

- sin + cinema ⇒ sinema
- sham + champagne ⇒ shampagne

then the effect depends on orthography alone. (They are also called orthographic blends.)

An orthographic overlap need not also be phonological:

- smoke + fog ⇒ smog
- binary + digit ⇒ bit
- bro + trogladyte ⇒ brogladyte

For some linguists, an overlap is a condition for a blend.

==== Non-overlapping blends ====
Non-overlapping blends (also called substitution blends) have no overlap, whether phonological or orthographic:

- California + Mexico ⇒ Calexico
- beautiful + delicious ⇒ beaulicious

=== Morphosemantic classification ===
Morphosemantically, blends fall into two kinds: attributive and coordinate.

==== Attributive blends ====
Attributive blends (also called syntactic or telescope blends) are blends where one of the ingredients is the head and the other is attributive. A porta-light is a portable light, not a 'light-emitting' or light portability; in this instance, light is the head, while "porta-" is attributive. A snobject is a snobbery-satisfying object and not an objective or other kind of snob; object is the head.

As is also true for (conventional, non-blend) attributive compounds (among which bathroom, for example, is a kind of room, not a kind of bath), the attributive blends of English are mostly head-final and mostly endocentric. As an example of an exocentric attributive blend, Fruitopia may metaphorically take the buyer to a fruity utopia (and not a utopian fruit); however, it is not a utopia but a drink.

==== Coordinate blends ====
Coordinate blends (also called associative or portmanteau blends) combine two words having equal status, and have two heads. Thus brunch is neither a breakfasty lunch nor a lunchtime breakfast but instead some hybrid of breakfast and lunch; Oxbridge is equally Oxford and Cambridge universities. This too parallels (conventional, non-blend) compounds: an actor–director is equally an actor and a director.

Two kinds of coordinate blends are particularly conspicuous: those that combine (near‑) synonyms:

- gigantic + enormous ⇒ ginormous
- insinuation + innuendo ⇒ insinuendo

and those that combine (near‑) opposites:

- transmitter + receiver ⇒ transceiver
- friend + enemy ⇒ frenemy

=== Blending of two roots ===
Blending can also apply to roots rather than words, for instance in Israeli Hebrew:

- רמז (√rmz 'hint') + אור (or 'light') ⇒ רמזור (ramzor 'traffic light')
- מגדל (migdal 'tower') + אור (or 'light') ⇒ מגדלור (migdalor 'lighthouse')
- Mishnaic Hebrew: דחפ (√dħp 'push') + Biblical Hebrew: חפר (√ħpr 'dig') ⇒ דחפור (dakhpór 'bulldozer')
- Israeli שלטוט shiltút 'zapping, surfing the channels, flipping through the channels' derives from
  - (i) (Hebrew>) Israeli שלט shalát 'remote control', an ellipsis – like English remote (but using the noun instead) – of the (widely known) compound שלט רחוק shalát rakhók – cf. the Academy of the Hebrew Language's שלט רחק shalát rákhak; and
  - (ii) (Hebrew>) Israeli שטוט shitút 'wandering, vagrancy'. Israeli שלטוט shiltút was introduced by the Academy of the Hebrew Language in [...] 1996. Synchronically, it might appear to result from reduplication of the final consonant of shalát 'remote control'.
- Another example of blending which has also been explained as mere reduplication is Israeli גחלילית gakhlilít 'fire-fly, glow-fly, Lampyris'. This coinage by Hayyim Nahman Bialik blends (Hebrew>) Israeli גחלת gakhélet 'burning coal' with (Hebrew>) Israeli לילה láyla 'night'. Compare this with the unblended חכלילית khakhlilít '(black) redstart, Phœnicurus' (<Biblical Hebrew חכליל 'dull red, reddish'). Synchronically speaking though, most native Israeli-speakers feel that gakhlilít includes a reduplication of the third radical of גחל √għl. This is incidentally how Ernest Klein explains gakhlilít. Since he is attempting to provide etymology, his description might be misleading if one agrees that Hayyim Nahman Bialik had blending in mind."

"There are two possible etymological analyses for Israeli Hebrew כספר kaspár 'bank clerk, teller'. The first is that it consists of (Hebrew>) Israeli כסף késef 'money' and the (International/Hebrew>) Israeli agentive suffix ר- -ár. The second is that it is a quasi-portmanteau word which blends כסף késef 'money' and (Hebrew>) Israeli ספר √spr 'count'. Israeli Hebrew כספר kaspár started as a brand name but soon entered the common language. Even if the second analysis is the correct one, the final syllable ר- -ár apparently facilitated nativization since it was regarded as the Hebrew suffix ר- -år (probably of Persian pedigree), which usually refers to craftsmen and professionals, for instance as in Mendele Mocher Sforim's coinage סמרטוטר smartutár 'rag-dealer'."

==== Lexical selection ====
Blending may occur with an error in lexical selection, the process by which a speaker uses his semantic knowledge to choose words. Lewis Carroll's explanation, which gave rise to the use of 'portmanteau' for such combinations, was:

Humpty Dumpty's theory, of two meanings packed into one word like a portmanteau, seems to me the right explanation for all. For instance, take the two words "fuming" and "furious." Make up your mind that you will say both words ... you will say "frumious."

The errors are based on similarity of meanings, rather than phonological similarities, and the morphemes or phonemes stay in the same position within the syllable.

== Use ==
Some languages, like Japanese, encourage the shortening and merging of borrowed foreign words (as in gairaigo), because they are long or difficult to pronounce in the target language. For example, karaoke, a combination of the Japanese word kara (meaning empty) and the clipped form oke of the English loanword "orchestra" (J. ōkesutora, オーケストラ), is a Japanese blend that has entered the English language. The Vietnamese language also encourages blend words formed from Sino-Vietnamese vocabulary. For example, the term Việt Cộng is derived from the first syllables of "Việt Nam" (Vietnam) and "Cộng sản" (communist).

Many corporate brand names, trademarks, and initiatives, and names of corporations and organizations themselves, are blends. For example, Wiktionary, one of Wikipedia's sister projects, is a blend of wiki and dictionary.

== Origin of the term portmanteau ==
=== Terminological history ===
==== In France ====
According to The American Heritage Dictionary of the English Language (AHD), the etymology of the word is the French porte-manteau, from porter, "to carry", and manteau, "overcoat" (from Old French mantel, from Latin mantellum).

According to the OED Online, the etymology of the word is the "officer who carries the mantle of a person in a high position (1507 in Middle French), case or bag for carrying clothing (1547), clothes rack (1640)".

In Encyclopedia, or a Reasoned Dictionary of the Sciences, Arts and Crafts (1765), in Classical French language, Denis Diderot and Jean Le Rond d'Alembert wrote,

Porte-manteau, f.m. (Hift. mod.) is said of an officer in the household of the King of France. There are 12 of them. Their charge is to guard the King's hat, gloves, cane, sword, etc., to receive them from his hand, and to bring them to him when he needs them. The portemanteau follows the King on a hunt, with a suitcase or porte-manteau garnished with handkerchiefs, shirts, and other undergarments, so that H. M. can change in case of need.
The Dauphin also has his portemanteau. Cardinals in Rome have ecclesiastical officers called caudataires, because they carry the train of their robe, and in France there are valets-de-chambre charged with the same office, which have some relation to the portemanteau.

In the 18th century France, portemanteaux were considered a structure within wardrobes or closets, or attached to a wall, for hanging clothes, hats, and coats.

A porte-manteau in modern French is also a clothes valet, a coat-tree or similar article of furniture for hanging up jackets, hats, umbrellas and the like.

==== Derivation in the English language ====
A portmanteau (luggage) was a suitcase that opened into two equal sections. According to the OED Online, a portmanteau is a "case or bag for carrying clothing and other belongings when travelling; (originally) one of a form suitable for carrying on horseback; (now esp.) one in the form of a stiff leather case hinged at the back to open into two equal parts".

The word portmanteau was introduced in this sense by Lewis Carroll in the book Through the Looking-Glass (1871), where Humpty Dumpty explains to Alice the coinage of unusual words used in "Jabberwocky". Slithy means "slimy and lithe" and mimsy means "miserable and flimsy". Humpty Dumpty explains to Alice the practice of combining words in various ways, comparing it to the then-common type of luggage, which opens into two equal parts:

You see it's like a portmanteau—there are two meanings packed up into one word.

In his introduction to his 1876 poem The Hunting of the Snark, Carroll again uses portmanteau when discussing lexical selection:

Humpty Dumpty's theory, of two meanings packed into one word like a portmanteau, seems to me the right explanation for all. For instance, take the two words "fuming" and "furious". Make up your mind that you will say both words, but leave it unsettled which you will say first … if you have the rarest of gifts, a perfectly balanced mind, you will say "frumious".

An occasional synonym for "portmanteau word" is frankenword, an autological word exemplifying the phenomenon it describes, blending "Frankenstein" and "word".

=== Terminology preference ===
==== Portmanteau and blend ====
The term "portmanteau word" was retained by literary scholars and "widely imposed itself" in Anglo-Saxon literature. Linguists such as Pound (1914), Berman (1961), Adams (1973), and Bryant (1973–74), preferred "blend". Lexicographers also identify such words as "blends".

==== Mot-valise ====
Referring at some point to "the two-part envelope containing the horse rider's pack", the old French word "portemanteau" lost its meaning when it was derived and exported into English as "portmanteau". Author and linguist Almuth Grésillon wrote that the French term mot-portemanteau ('mot': word) "risked not evoking even the vague idea that [Lewis] Carroll had sketched". Thus, the term "mot-valise" (lit. 'word-suitcase'), and not "portmanteau", is used in France to designate a word formed by the merging of other words.

== Examples in English ==
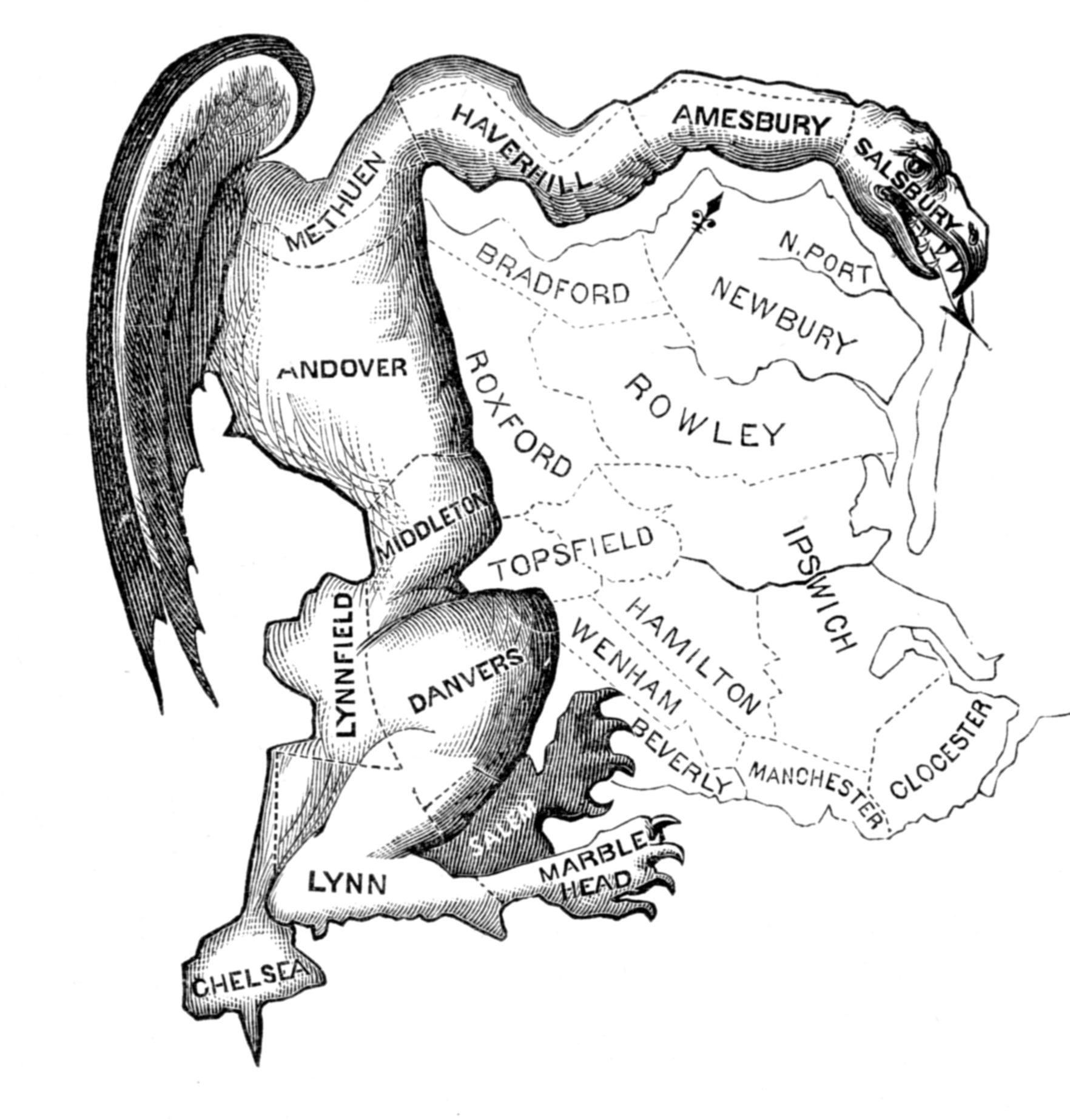
The original Gerrymander pictured in an 1812 cartoon. The word is a portmanteau of Massachusetts Governor Elbridge Gerry's name with salamander.

Many neologisms are examples of blends, but many blends have become part of the lexicon. In Punch in 1896, the word brunch (breakfast + lunch) was introduced as a "portmanteau word". In 1964, the newly independent African republic of Tanganyika and Zanzibar chose the portmanteau word Tanzania as its name. Similarly, Eurasia is a portmanteau of Europe and Asia.

Some city names are portmanteaus of the border regions they straddle: Texarkana spreads across the Texas-Arkansas-Louisiana border, while Calexico and Mexicali are respectively the American and Mexican sides of a single conurbation. A scientific example is a liger, which is a cross between a male lion and a female tiger (a tigon is a similar cross in which the male is a tiger). A more modern blend of ‘Cat’ and ‘Rabbit’ was founded 2023 on X (formerly known as Twitter) to describe a circulating image of a mix between the two, producing the word ‘Cabbit’.

Many company or brand names are portmanteaus, including Microsoft, a portmanteau of microcomputer and software; the cheese Cambozola combines a similar rind to Camembert with the same mould used to make Gorgonzola; passenger rail company Amtrak, a portmanteau of America and track; Velcro, a portmanteau of the French velours (velvet) and crochet (hook); Verizon, a portmanteau of veritas (Latin for truth) and horizon; Viacom, a portmanteau of Video and Audio communications, and ComEd (a Chicago-area electric utility company), a portmanteau of Commonwealth and Edison.

Jeoportmanteau! is a recurring category on the American television quiz show Jeopardy! The category's name is itself a portmanteau of the words Jeopardy and portmanteau. Responses in the category are portmanteaus constructed by fitting two words together.

Portmanteau words may be produced by joining proper nouns with common nouns, such as "gerrymandering", which refers to the scheme of Massachusetts Governor Elbridge Gerry for politically contrived redistricting; the perimeter of one of the districts thereby created resembled a very curvy salamander in outline. The term gerrymander has itself contributed to portmanteau terms bjelkemander and playmander.

Oxbridge is a common portmanteau for the UK's two oldest universities, those of Oxford and Cambridge. In 2016, Britain's planned exit from the European Union became known as "Brexit".

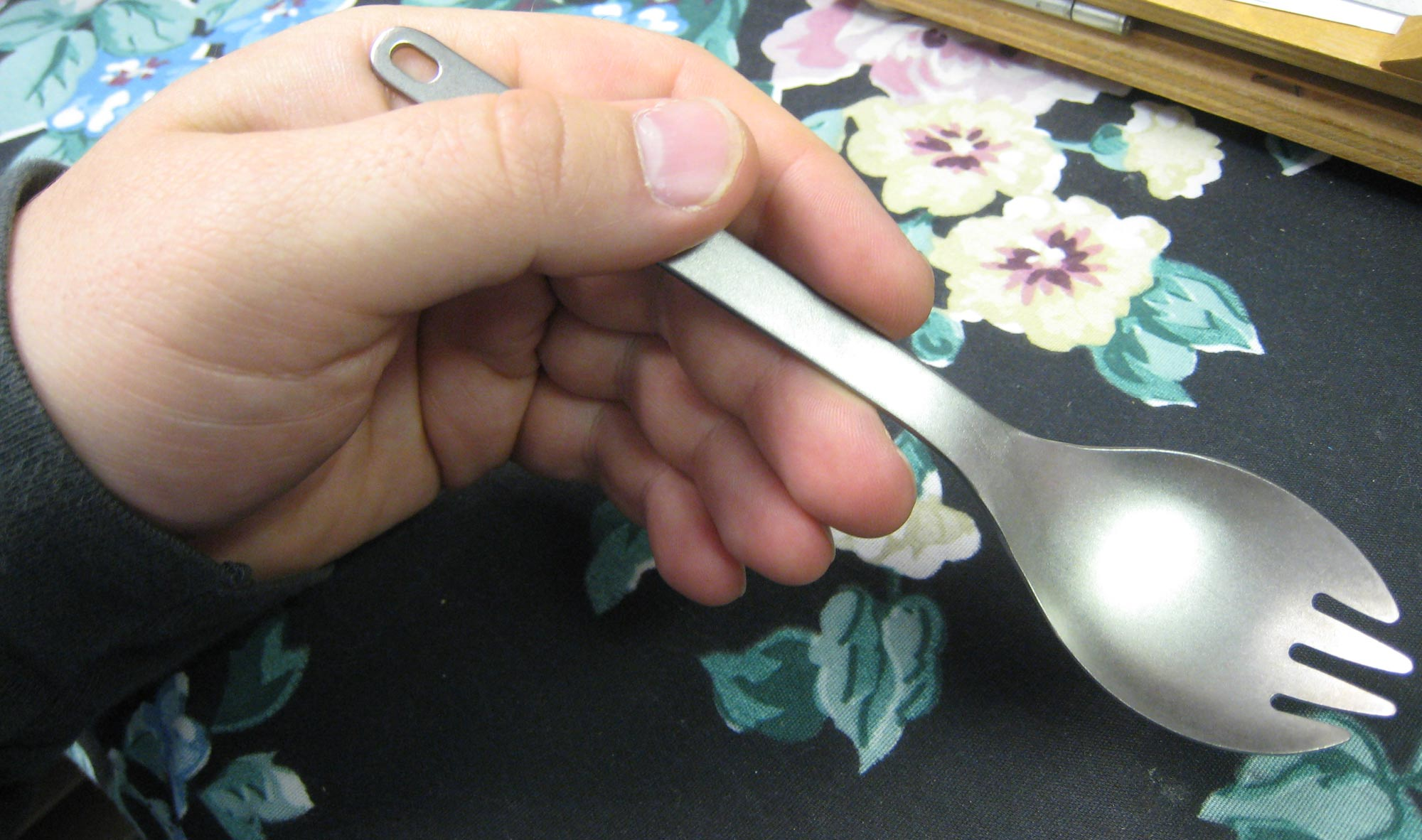
A spork

The word refudiate was famously used by Sarah Palin when she misspoke, conflating the words refute and repudiate. Though the word was a gaffe, it was recognized as the New Oxford American Dictionary's "Word of the Year" in 2010.

The business lexicon includes words like "advertainment" (advertising as entertainment), "advertorial" (a blurred distinction between advertising and editorial), "infotainment" (information about entertainment or itself intended to entertain by its manner of presentation), and "infomercial" (informational commercial).

Company and product names may also use portmanteau words: examples include Timex (a portmanteau of Time [referring to Time magazine] and Kleenex), Renault's Twingo (a combination of twist, swing and tango), and Garmin (portmanteau of company founders' first names Gary Burrell and Min Kao). "Desilu Productions" was a Los Angeles–based company jointly owned by actor couple Desi Arnaz and Lucille Ball. Miramax is the combination of the first names of the parents of the Weinstein brothers.

=== Name-meshing ===
Given names may originate as portmanteaux. For example, Cheryl may be a combination of chérie and Beryl. The name Jalen originated with Jalen Rose as a combination of James and Leonard. Jonathan Swift created the nickname Vanessa for Esther (Essa) Vanhomrigh. Marlene Dietrich, born Marie Magdalene, combined her names.

Two names can also be used in creating a portmanteau word in reference to the partnership between people, especially in cases where both persons are well-known, or sometimes to produce epithets such as "Billary" (referring to former United States president Bill Clinton and his wife, former United States Secretary of State Hillary Clinton). In this example of recent American political history, the purpose for blending is not so much to combine the meanings of the source words but "to suggest a resemblance of one named person to the other"; the effect is often derogatory, as linguist Benjamin Zimmer states. For instance, Putler is used by critics of Vladimir Putin, merging his name with Adolf Hitler. By contrast, the public, including the media, use portmanteaus to refer to their favorite pairings as a way to "...giv[e] people an essence of who they are within the same name." This is particularly seen in cases of fictional and real-life "supercouples". An early known example, Bennifer, referred to film stars Ben Affleck and Jennifer Lopez. Other examples include Brangelina (Brad Pitt and Angelina Jolie) and TomKat (Tom Cruise and Katie Holmes). On Wednesday, 28 June 2017, The New York Times crossword included the quip, "How I wish Natalie Portman dated Jacques Cousteau, so I could call them 'Portmanteau'".

Holidays are another example, as in Thanksgivukkah, a portmanteau neologism given to the convergence of the American holiday of Thanksgiving and the first day of the Jewish holiday of Hanukkah on Thursday, 28 November 2013. Chrismukkah is another pop-culture portmanteau neologism popularized by the TV drama The O.C., a merging of the holidays of Christianity's Christmas and Judaism's Hanukkah.

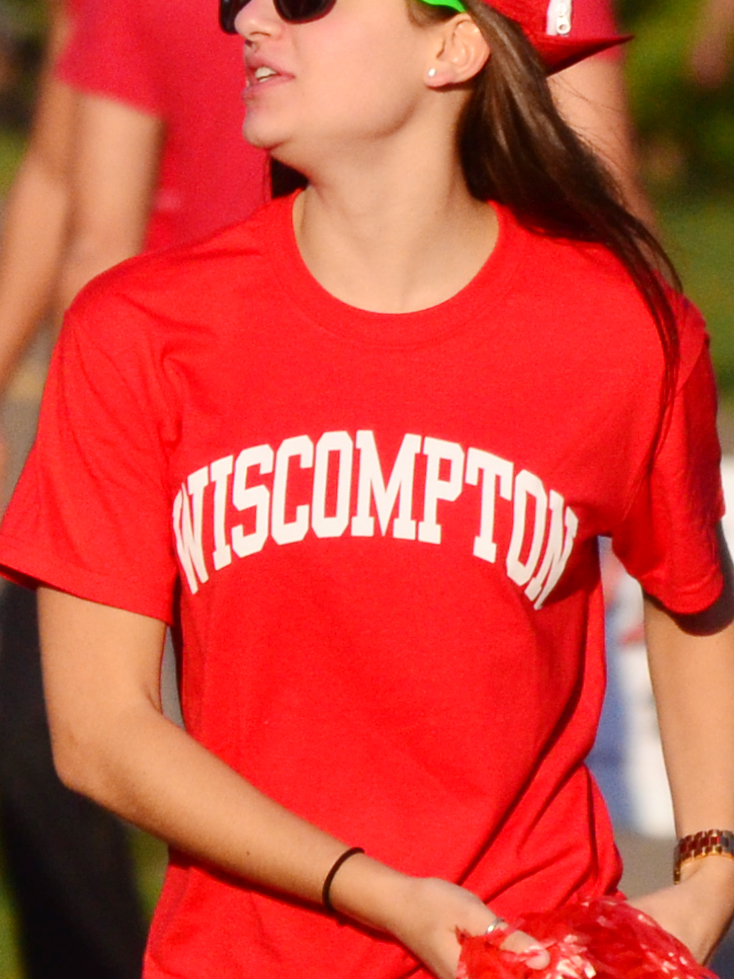
This T-shirt combines the names of two places, Wisconsin and Compton, California, to form "Wiscompton".

In the Disney film Big Hero 6, the film is situated in a fictitious city called "San Fransokyo", which is a portmanteau of two real locations, San Francisco and Tokyo.

== Other languages ==
=== Modern Hebrew ===
Modern Hebrew abounds with blending. Along with CD, or simply דיסק (disk), Hebrew has the blend תקליטור (taklitór), which consists of תקליט (taklít 'phonograph record') and אור (or 'light'). Other blends in Hebrew include the following:

- ערפיח (arpíakh 'smog'), from ערפל (arafél 'fog') and פיח (píakh 'soot')
- מדרחוב (midrakhov 'pedestrian-only street'), from מדרכה (midrakhá 'sidewalk') and רחוב (rekhóv 'street')
- מחזמר (makhazémer 'musical'), from מחזה (makhazé 'theatre play') and זמר (zémer 'singing [gerund]')
- מגדלור (migdalór 'lighthouse'), from מגדל (migdál 'tower') and אור (or 'light')
- קרנף (karnáf 'rhinoceros'), from קרן (kéren 'horn') and אף (af 'nose')
- רמזור (ramzór 'traffic light'), from רמז (rémez 'indication') and אור (or 'light')
- חוטיני (khutíni 'thong bikini'), from חוט (khut 'string') and ביקיני (bikíni 'bikini')

Sometimes the root of the second word is truncated, giving rise to a blend that resembles an acrostic:

- תפוז (tapúz 'orange [fruit]'), from תפוח (tapúakh 'apple') and זהב (zaháv 'gold')
- תפוד (tapúd 'potato'), from תפוח (tapúakh 'apple') and אדמה (adamá 'soil, earth'), but the full תפוח אדמה (tapúakh adamá 'apple of the soil, apple of the earth') is more common

=== Irish ===
A few portmanteaus are in use in modern Irish, for example:

- Brexit is referred to as Breatimeacht (from Breatain 'Britain' and imeacht 'leave') or Sasamach (from Sasana 'England' and amach 'out')
- The resignation of Tánaiste (deputy prime minister) Frances Fitzgerald was referred to as Slánaiste (from slán 'goodbye' and Tánaiste)
- Naíonra, an Irish-language preschool (from naíonán 'infants' and gasra 'band')
- The Irish translation of A Game of Thrones refers to Winterfell castle as Gheimhsceirde (from gheimhridh 'winter' and sceird 'exposed to winds')
- Jailtacht (from English jail and Gaeltacht 'Irish-speaking region'): the community of Irish-speaking republican prisoners.

=== Icelandic ===
There is a tradition of linguistic purism in Icelandic, and neologisms are frequently created from pre-existing words. For example, tölva 'computer' is a portmanteau of tala 'digit, number' and völva 'oracle, seeress'.

=== Indonesian ===
In Indonesian, portmanteaus and acronyms are very common in both formal and informal usage.

A common use of a portmanteau in the Indonesian language is to refer to locations and areas of the country. For example, Jabodetabek is a portmanteau that refers to the Jakarta metropolitan area or Greater Jakarta, which includes the regions of Jakarta, Bogor, Depok, Tangerang, Bekasi).

==== Malaysian ====
In the Malaysian national language of Bahasa Melayu, the word jadong was constructed out of three Malay words for evil (jahat), stupid (bodoh) and arrogant (sombong) to be used on the worst kinds of community and religious leaders who mislead naive, submissive and powerless folk under their thrall.

=== Japanese ===
A very common type of portmanteau in Japanese forms one word from the beginnings of two others (that is, from two back-clippings). The portion of each input word retained is usually two morae, which is tantamount to one kanji in most words written in kanji.

The inputs to the process can be native words, Sino-Japanese words, gairaigo (later borrowings), or combinations thereof. A Sino-Japanese example is the name 東大 (Tōdai) for the University of Tokyo, in full 東京大学 (Tōkyō daigaku). With borrowings, typical results are words such as パソコン (pasokon), meaning personal computer (PC), which despite being formed of English elements does not exist in English; it is a uniquely Japanese contraction of the English personal computer (パーソナル・コンピュータ, pāsonaru konpyūta). Another example, Pokémon (ポケモン), is a contracted form of the English words pocket (ポケット, poketto) and monsters (モンスター, monsutā). A famous example of a blend with mixed sources is karaoke (カラオケ, karaoke), blending the Japanese word for empty (空, kara) and the Greek word orchestra (オーケストラ, ōkesutora). The Japanese fad of egg-shaped keychain pet toys from the 1990s, Tamagotchi, is a portmanteau combining the two Japanese words tamago (たまご, 'egg'), and uotchi (ウオッチ, 'watch'). The portmanteau can also be seen as a combination of tamago (たまご, 'egg'), and tomodachi (友だち, 'friend').

Some titles also are portmanteaus, such as Hetalia (ヘタリア). It came from Hetare (ヘタレ, 'idiot') and Italia (イタリア, 'Italy'). Another example is Servamp, which came from the English words Servant (サーヴァント) and Vampire (ヴァンパイア).

=== Portuguese ===
In Brazilian Portuguese, portmanteaus are usually slang, including:

- Cantriz, from cantora 'female singer' and atriz 'actress', which defines women that both sing and act.
- Aborrescente, from aborrecer 'annoy' and adolescente 'teenager', which is a pejorative term for teenagers.
- Pescotapa, from pescoço 'neck' and tapa 'slap', which defines a slap on the back of the neck.

=== Spanish ===
Although traditionally uncommon in Spanish, portmanteaus are increasingly finding their way into the language, mainly for marketing and commercial purposes. Examples in Mexican Spanish include cafebrería from combining cafetería 'coffee shop' and librería 'bookstore', or teletón 'telethon' from combining televisión and maratón. Portmanteaus are also frequently used to make commercial brands, such as "chocolleta" from "chocolate" + "galleta". They are also often used to create business company names, especially for small, family-owned businesses, where owners' names are combined to create a unique name (such as Rocar, from "Roberto" + "Carlos", or Mafer, from "María" + "Fernanda"). These usages help to create distinguishable trademarks. It is a common occurrence for people with two names to combine them into a single nickname, like Juanca for Juan Carlos, Or Marilú for María de Lourdes.

Other examples:

- Cantautor 'singer-songwriter', from cantante 'singer' and autor 'songwriter'.
- Mecatrónica and Ofimática, two neologisms that are blends of mecánica 'mechanical' with electrónica 'electronics', and oficina 'office' with informática 'informatics' respectively.
- Espanglish, interlanguage that combines words from both Spanish (Español) and English.
- Metrobús, blend of metro 'subway' and autobús.
- Autopista, blend of automóvil 'car' and pista 'road, tracks'.
- Company names and brands with portmanteaus are common in Spanish. Some examples of Spanish portmanteaus for Mexican companies include: The Mexican flag carrier Aeroméxico, (Aerovías de México), Banorte (Bank and North), Cemex (Cement and Mexico), Jumex (Jugos Mexicanos or Mexican Juice), Mabe (from founders Egon MAbardi and Francisco BErrondo), Pemex (Petróleos Mexicanos or Mexican Oil), Softtek (portmanteau and stylization of Software and technology), and Telmex (Teléfonos de Mexico). Gamesa (Galletera Mexicana, S.A. or Mexican Biscuit Company, Inc.) and Famsa (fabricantes Muebleros, S.A.) are examples of portmanteaus of four words, including the "S.A." (Sociedad Anónima).
- Many more portmanteaus in Spanish come from Anglicisms, which are words borrowed from English, like módem, transistor, códec, email, internet, and emoticon.

A somewhat popular example in Spain is the word gallifante, a portmanteau of gallo y elefante 'cockerel and elephant'. It was the prize on the Spanish version of the children TV show Child's Play (Spanish: Juego de niños) that ran on the public television channel La 1 of Televisión Española (TVE) from 1988 to 1992.

== Portmanteau morph ==
In word formation, a blend is a word formed by fusing material from two or more words. A portmanteau morph is a single morph analyzed as expressing two or more morphemes at once.

For example, in the Latin word animalis ("of an animal"), the ending -is marks both genitive case and singular number. In English, two separate words are used: of an animal. Other examples include French: *à le ⇒ au [o] ("to the") and *de le ⇒ du [dy] ("of the").

== See also ==
- Abbreviation
- Acronym and initialism
- Clipping (morphology)
- Conceptual blending
- Amalgamation (names)
- Hybrid word
- List of geographic portmanteaus
- List of portmanteaus
- Phonestheme
- Phono-semantic matching
- Portmanteau sentence
- Syllabic abbreviation
- Wiktionary category:English blends
