= Autostrada (disambiguation) =

Autostrada is the name used for a controlled-access highway in several languages. In English, it typically refers to the Autostrade of Italy.

Autostrada may also refer to:

== By country ==
- Roads and expressways in Romania
- Roads and expressways in Poland
- Part of the network of transport in Albania
- Autoestrada, express roads in Portugal

== See also ==
- Autoroute (disambiguation), the name used in French
- Autobahn (disambiguation), the name used in German
- Autopista (disambiguation), the name used in Spanish
- Atlantia (company), Italian company formerly called Autostrade
- Autostrad (band), Jordanian indie band
