= Audubon Park Historic District =

Audubon Park Historic District may refer to:

- Audubon Park Historic District, Kentucky, in Audubon Park, Kentucky, on the National Register of Historic Places
- Audubon Park Historic District, Memphis, Tennessee, on the National Register of Historic Places
- Audubon Park, Manhattan in Manhattan, New York City, a designated New York City Landmark
