= Beth Levin (musician) =

American classical pianist (born 1950)

Beth Levin (born December 17, 1950) is an American classical pianist in the Romantic tradition of her teachers Marian Filar, Rudolf Serkin, Leonard Shure, and Dorothy Taubman at the Taubman Institute. Levin is devoted to the highly expressive and demanding repertoire of Beethoven, Schumann, Chopin, Brahms, Rachmaninoff, and Ravel, as well as to the work of leading modernists such as Anders Eliasson, David Del Tredici, Alexander Goretzky, Louis Karchin, and Scott Wheeler.

== Early influences ==
Born in Philadelphia, Pennsylvania, Levin's fascination with music developed from the age of 3, when she first began piano lessons. Levin says: "Some of my earliest memories are of playing as my father sang. We were fortunate to have a brilliant pianist living just around the corner: Cecille Sharlip, who had emigrated from Europe to study at the Curtis Institute of Music. Sharlip guided me until I was 12, at which time she suggested I audition for the great Chopin interpreter Marian Filar, who was then teaching at the Settlement Music School (Philadelphia). I absorbed a sense of musical tradition that has never left me." Working with Filar, himself a former student of Walter Gieseking, led to Levin winning at the age of 12 an audition to perform with the Philadelphia Orchestra. Four years later, she again appeared with that orchestra.

== Musical education ==
At the age of 17, Levin successfully auditioned for Serkin, then a professor of piano and director of the Curtis Institute. Levin said: “Mr. Serkin was an inspiration the moment he walked into a room, a single word evoking the eloquence of a poem.” Other teachers at Curtis included chamber musicians Arnold Steinhardt and David Soyer, first violinist and cellist, respectively, of the Guarneri Quartet. Levin completed her academic work as a Boston University student of Leonard Shure, who was in turn a student and teaching assistant of the great Beethoven interpreter Artur Schnabel. "I recall Shure asking me at the audition why I made music. 'Because I love it,' I said simply. He suggested we start lessons that very day."

== Performing career ==
As a freshly minted performer, Levin undertook years of travel, both within the United States and abroad. Branching out into as many performing roles as possible, she appeared as a soloist, chamber music participant, and concerto soloist. As an artist in the “Music From Marlboro” program (an offshoot of the Marlboro Music School and Festival and the Curtis Institute), Levin worked with pianist Paul Badura-Skoda, violinist Sandor Vegh, founder of the renowned Vegh Quartet, and bassist Julius Levine,. She appeared in other chamber music venues, accompanying Raphael Hillyer of the Juilliard Quartet and flutist Paula Robison. Still in her early 20s, Levin appeared as piano concerto performer with the Boston Symphony Orchestra led by Arthur Fiedler, the Seattle Symphony led by American musician and conductor Milton Katims, and the Boston Philharmonic led by Benjamin Zander. European travel led Levin to Spain, Iceland, Serbia, and Turkey. In Iceland, where she continues to appear yearly as soloist, she founded and played for 10 years with Trio Borealis as well as with members of the Iceland Symphony Orchestra. She traveled throughout Spain as a member of the trio. She gave master classes in Serbia and Turkey under the aegis of the U.S. State Department.

== New York ==
Establishing herself in New York, Levin studied with pre-eminent piano mentor Dorothy Taubman. Levin gave recitals at Lincoln Center for the Performing Arts, Steinway Hall, and the Metropolitan Museum of Art. She worked with members of the New York Philharmonic and recorded with other Marlboro musicians for Columbia Masterworks Records. Concerts throughout the U.S. featured work with such chamber ensembles as the Audubon Quartet and the Vermeer Quartet. Levin is one of five musicians who comprise Vista Lirica, a chamber group devoted to the cause of environmentalism and the music of the Romantics. As part of her continued commitment to contemporary composers, Levin collaborated with Del Tredici to perform his “Ballad in Yellow.” Levin has appeared in broadcast interviews and performances on radio stations WNYC, WNYE, and WQXR in New York, WFMT in Chicago, and WGBH in Boston. She conducted American master classes at such institutions as New York University and The College of William & Mary.

== Recent recordings ==
Among Levin's recordings are A Single Breath: Beethoven's Last Three Piano Sonatas (Navona Records, 2013), Beethoven's Diabelli Variations (Centaur Records, 2011) and Bach's Goldberg Variations (Centaur Records, 2008). "Revelatory", commented Richard Brody in The New Yorker on Levin's approach to the Beethoven sonatas, adding that the pianist had "conveyed the sense of being in the vicariously conjured presence of Beethoven himself."

Jeremy Eichler, in a review in The New York Times on June 10, 2005, described Levin's pianism thus: "Ms. Levin [keeps] the ear engaged with boldly inflected readings and an impressive ability to convey emotion without exhibition."
