= Autobahn (disambiguation) =

Autobahn is the high-speed intercity highways of Germany and Austria.

Autobahn (pl. Autobahnen) is German for motorway or highway and may refer to:

== Entertainment ==
- Autobahn (album), a 1974 Kraftwerk album
  - "Autobahn" (song), the album's title song
- Autobahn (play), a 2004 play by Neil LaBute
- The name of the fictional German band in the 1998 film The Big Lebowski

== Transportation highways ==
- Autobahns of Germany
- Autobahns of Austria
- Motorways of Switzerland

== Other ==
- Autobahn Country Club, auto racing course in Joliet, Illinois

== See also ==
- Audubon (disambiguation)
- Autostrada (disambiguation)
