= Santa Maria della Purità (Rome) =

Demolished church in Rome, Italy

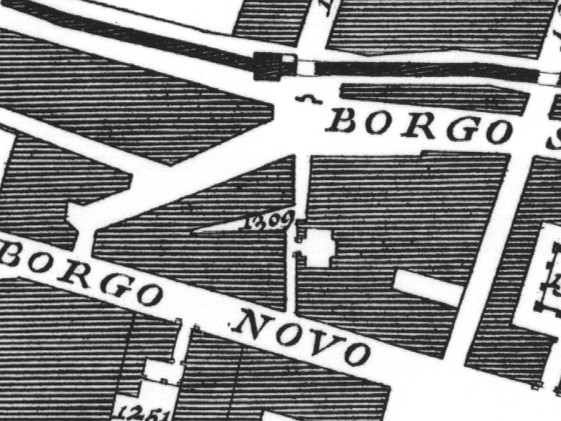
The church (with the number 1309) in the map of Rome by Giambattista Nolli

Santa Maria della Purità was a church in Rome, important for historical and artistic reasons. Consecrated between 1530 and 1538, the building was demolished together with the surrounding district in 1937-40 during the works for the opening of via della Conciliazione.

== Location ==
The Church was located in Rome, in the rione Borgo, in the homonymous alley ("vicolo della purità") that joined Borgo Nuovo to Borgo Sant'Angelo. The alley was separated from Borgo Nuovo by an arch, placed almost in front of the balcony of the palazzo dei Convertendi, called by the church Arco della Purità. On the top of the arch burned a perpetual lamp of artistic workmanship.

The church should not be confused with San Sebastiano in via pontificum, which lay very close but which at the time of the consecration of Santa Maria della Purità was probably already deconsecrated and abandoned.

== History ==
After the flooding of the Tiber river in 1530, a woman from the Borgo rione named Brianda, who had been sick for a long time on one hand, prayed for her own recovery an ancient image of the Virgin Mary that had come to light during the inundation. This was placed on a surviving wall of a ruined house that had belonged to the noblewoman Lucrezia Salviati. It had been destroyed during the sack of Rome in 1527 and in time it had become a garbage dump. Upon news of the healing, the painting's fame for its thaumaturgical virtues spread throughout the district, and the ruined house became the destination of a procession of the sick and needy who asked the Virgin for a grace.

The building was restored and transformed into a small church, named in contrast to the dirt of the place to the Virgin of Purity; first entrusted to a priest, in 1538 it was given into custody by Pope Paul III (r. 1534–49) to the association of caudatari; these were the priests of St. Peter's in charge of holding the trains (strascico in Romanesco) of the pope and cardinals during solemn ceremonies, as well as reminding them what they had to do. In 1546 Paul III transformed the sodality into a college, and the caudatari added a room to the building to house the chaplain. The shrine always remained in the possession of the college of the caudatari, who restored it during the pontificate of Pope Leo XII (r. 1823–29), but in 1897 it was abandoned. The church was demolished between 1937 and 1940 together with the spina di Borgo (the name denotes several blocks elongated in east–west direction between the castle and Saint Peter) for the construction of via della Conciliazione. The area on which the building lay is now part of the rebuilt Palazzo dei Convertendi.

On 1646, the painting was solemnly crowned as authorized by Pope Innocent X.

The miraculous image was transferred to Santa Maria in Traspontina.

== Architecture and interior ==
The shrine had a single nave and an altar, above which was placed the miraculous painting of the Virgin with Child, dating end of the 13th - beginning of the 14th century. Above it, there was a fresco representing the Padre Eterno e l'Annunciata.

== Sources ==
- Baronio, Cesare (1697). Descrizione di Roma moderna (in Italian). Roma: M.A. and P.A. De Rossi.
- Borgatti, Mariano (1926). Borgo e S. Pietro nel 1300 - 1600 - 1925 (in Italian). Federico Pustet, Roma.
- Ceccarelli, Giuseppe (Ceccarius) (1938). La "Spina" dei Borghi (in Italian). Danesi, Roma.
- Delli, Sergio (1988). Le strade di Roma (in Italian). Rome: Newton & Compton.
- Gigli, Laura (1992). Guide rionali di Roma (in Italian). Vol. Borgo (II). Fratelli Palombi Editori, Roma. ISSN 0393-2710.
- Leonardo Benevolo (2004). San Pietro e la città di Roma (in Italian). Bari: Laterza. ISBN 8842072362.
