= Audubon Park =

Audubon Park may refer to the following places in the United States:

- Audubon Park, Kentucky
- Audubon Park, Manhattan, New York
- Audubon Park, Minneapolis, Minnesota
- Audubon Park, New Jersey
- Audubon Park (New Orleans), Louisiana
- Audubon, New Orleans, Louisiana
- Audubon Park (Tampa), Florida

== See also ==
- Audubon Terrace, New York
- Audubon Zoo, New Orleans
