= Caudatario =

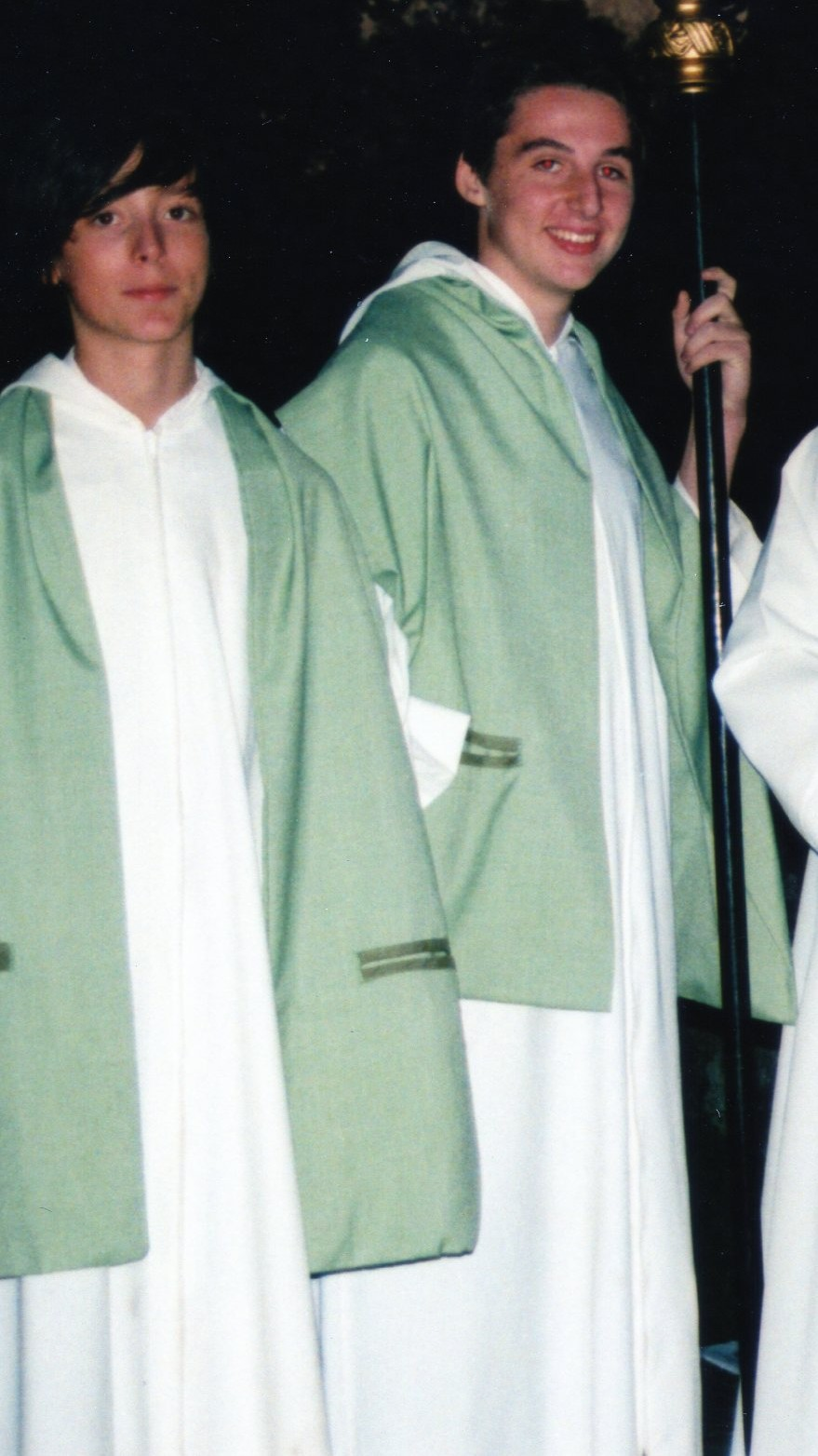
Caudatari wearing vimpas with "pockets" in which to insert their hands when holding a bishop's crosier or mitre

In the Catholic Church, a caudatario from cauda (Latin for 'tail') – plural caudatari (Italian for 'train-bearer'), was a priest in charge of carrying the train (strascico in Romanesco) of the cassock or the cappa magna of a prelate (cardinals, archbishops and bishops) during solemn ceremonies.

== History ==
The use of robes with trains, capes and hoods for cardinals was introduced by Pope Nicholas III (r. 1277–1280– ). Since this would hinder their movement, the need arose to have an assistant, first a layman, later a religious, to hold the train of the cardinal's cassock. During the Avignon Papacy, the use of a caudatario spread among the minor prelates, such as the archbishops and bishops.

In 1546, Pope Paul III transformed the association of the caudatari into a collegio.

=== Santa Maria della Purità ===
In 1538, Pope Paul III gave the custody of the small church of Santa Maria della Purità in the Roman rione of Borgo to the association of caudatari. They maintained the church until 1897, when it was abandoned.

== Function ==
At the beginning chaplain and Caudatario of a cardinal were two distinct figures, but then they merged into one. During the cardinal and papal solemn masses the caudatario was sitting next to the cardinal, holding his cap and reminding him what he had to do. The cardinal's vestments and furnishings were to be prepared by the caudatario to celebrate Mass in his domestic chapel, and to celebrate Mass itself.

== Dress ==
When the cardinals used the mitre, the caudatari wore a violet cape, and above it a white stole one palm wide, knee-length and ending in a golden fringe. For papal functions the crush was also purple, of woven fabric with wide and short sleeves and purple silk linings, and with a cape with a hood. One side of the hood had a pocket to hold the cardinal's breviary. Pope Paul V (r. 1605–21) added a purple skirt with black buttons and a sash with purple bows. On 30 November 1952, with the motu proprio Valde solliciti, pope Pius XII (r. 1939–58) shortened by half the train of the cardinals' cloaks (first 12 meters, today 6) and the decree of the Sacred Congregation of Rites of 4 December 1952, also shortened the bishops' cloaks by half (first 7 meters, today 3.5). John XXIII (r. 1958–63) restored the meters of the Cardinals' cloak to 12 meters and the bishop's cloak to 7 meters after the reform of Pius XII.

== Sources ==
- Gaetano Moroni. "Caudatario". Dizionario di erudizione storico-ecclesiastica da San Pietro ai nostri giorni (in Italian). Vol. 10. Venezia.
- Borgatti, Mariano (1926). Borgo e S. Pietro nel 1300 - 1600 - 1925 (in Italian). Federico Pustet, Roma.
- Gigli, Laura (1992). Guide rionali di Roma (in Italian). Vol. Borgo (II). Fratelli Palombi Editori, Roma. ISSN 0393-2710.
