= Audubon (Scott County, Kentucky) =

Historic house in Kentucky, United States

- U.S. National Register of Historic Places
- Location within Kentucky Location within the United States
- Nearest city: Georgetown, Kentucky
- Coordinates: 38°9′18″N 84°37′22″W
- Built: 1829
- Architectural style: Greek Revival
- NRHP reference No.: 73000830
- Added to NRHP: December 4, 1973

Audubon is one of a pair of Greek Revival houses built across from each other on Moore's Mill Pike in Scott County, Kentucky. The property was added to the U.S. National Register of Historic Places on December 4, 1973.

== History ==
In 1829, Charles B. Lewis bought farm land on Moore's Mill Pike from James Stephenson and built a Greek Revival style house on the property.
