= Autoroute =

Autoroute may refer to the following:

- Controlled-access highway, particularly in French-speaking countries
- Routing (electronic design automation), when routes to wires in a design are automatically assigned
- Microsoft AutoRoute, European name for Microsoft Streets & Trips, which helps plan trips by automobile

== See also ==
- Autoroutes of France
- Autoroutes of Quebec
- Autoroutes of Morocco
