= Vimpa =

Veil or shawl worn by religious servers

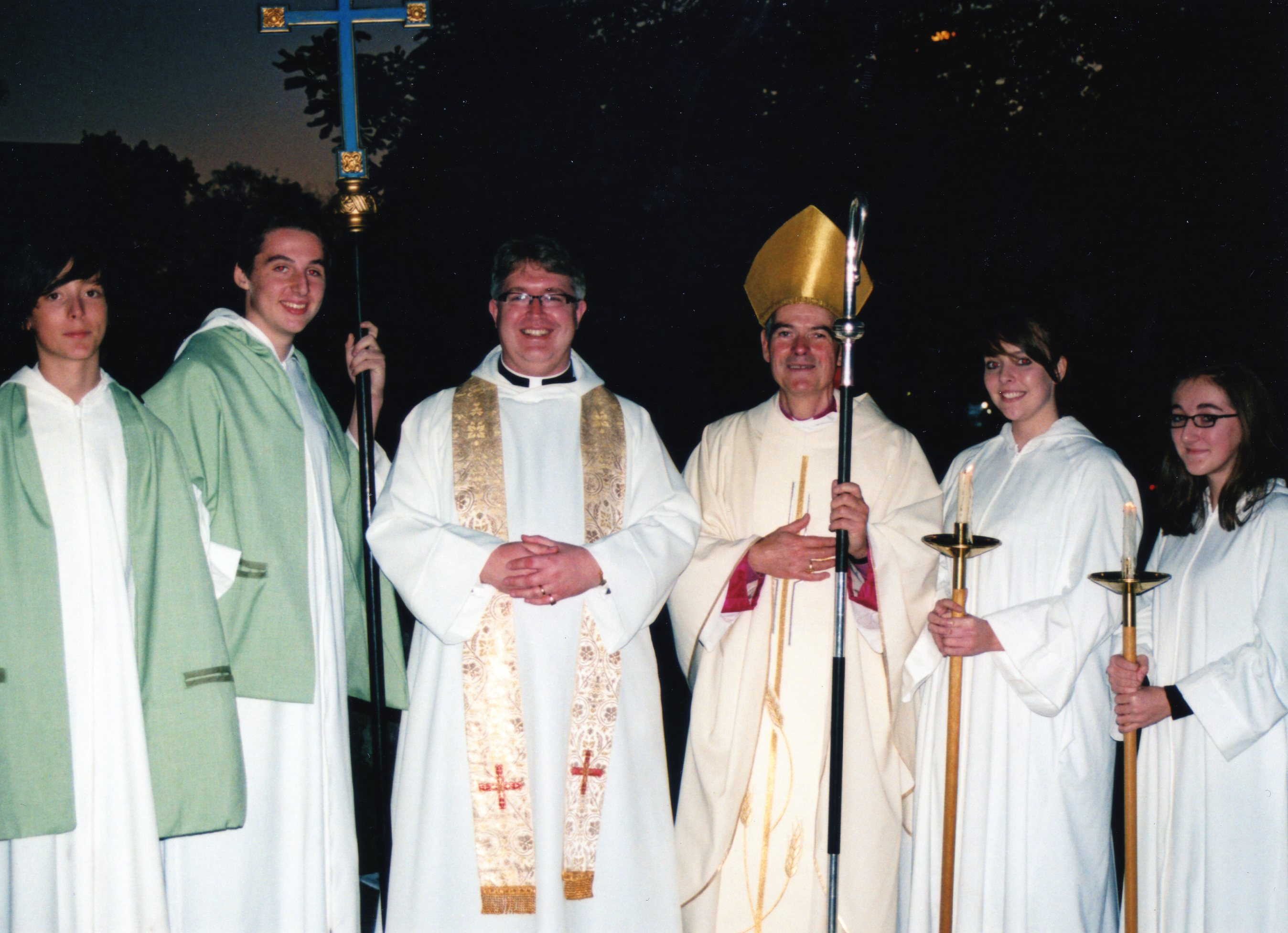
The vimpae may be seen here, though out of use, as the Anglican Bishop shown is wearing his mitre and holding his crozier. 'Pockets' may clearly be seen in the vimpae, for the servers to insert their hands when holding the pontificalia.

A vimpa (plural: vimpae) is a veil or shawl worn over the shoulders of servers who carry the mitre and crosier during liturgical functions when they are not being used by the bishop, in the Roman Catholic, Anglican, and some other western churches.

== Function ==
The vimpa is used to hold the mitre or crosier, thus preventing direct contact with the pontificalia by anyone other than the bishop.

A vimpa is also used on certain occasions to hold other sacred objects, such as vessels of holy oils.

== Design ==
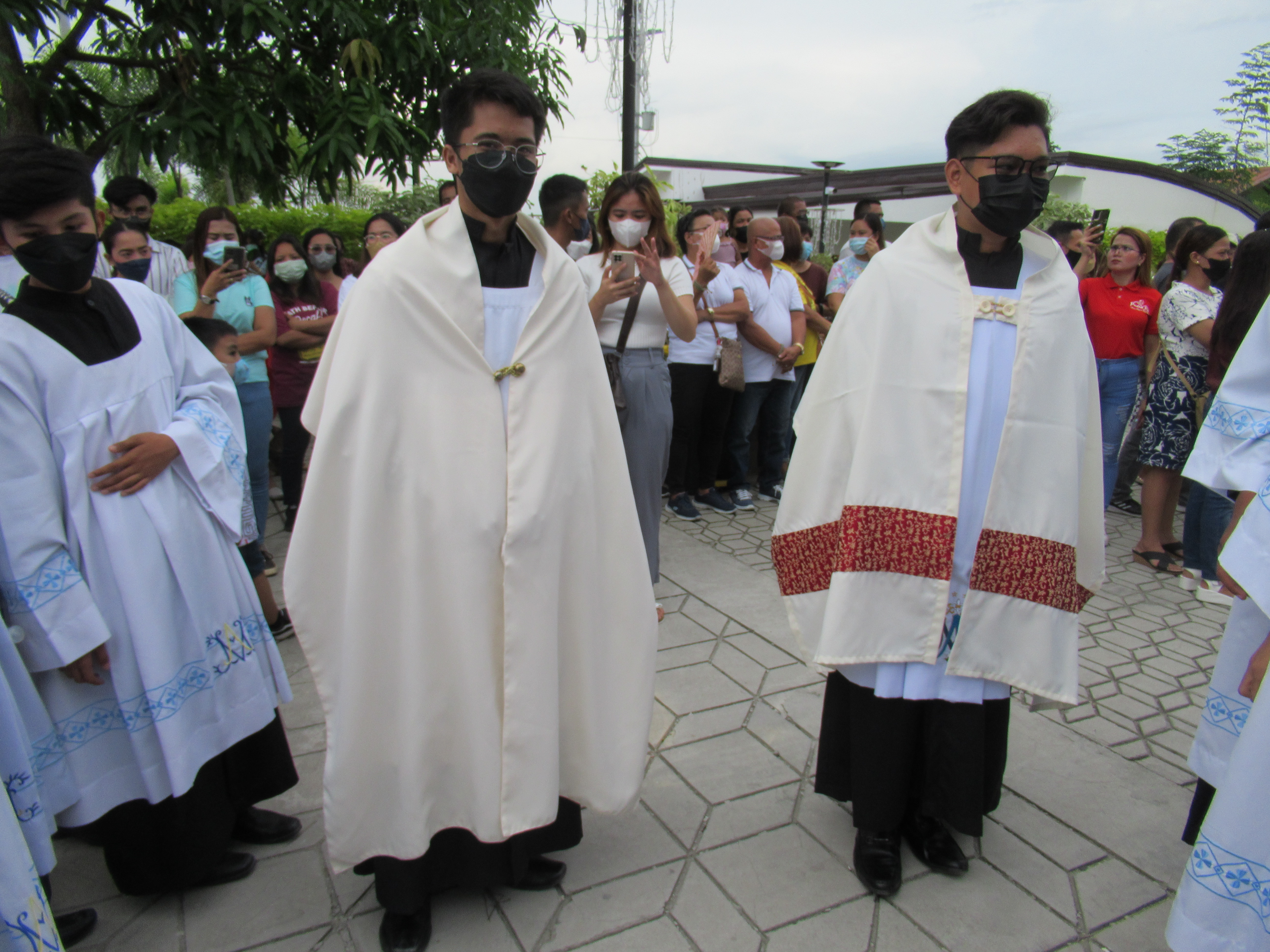
An altar server with a vimpa (right) before a pontifical Mass

The vimpa is a narrow, winding shawl or scarf, made of a light fabric (usually silk). It is either plain or simply decorated. The base colour is usually white, but for certain occasions it may be purple, green, or gold.

The vimpa may be considered a type of humeral veil.

== See also ==
- Humeral veil
- Pontifical
