= Audubon (surname) =

Audubon is a surname, and may refer to:

- John James Audubon (1785–1851), French-American ornithologist, naturalist, and painter
- John Woodhouse Audubon (1812–1862, American painter, son of John James Audubon
- Lucy Bakewell Audubon (1787–1874), educator and philanthropist, wife of John James Audubon
