= Audubon Quartet =

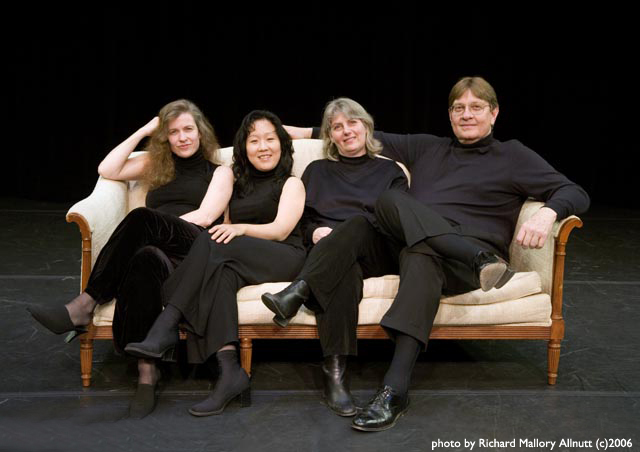
- Audubon Quartet backstage in 2006 in Reston, VA

Background information
- Origin: United States
- Genres: classical
- Years active: 1974-2011
- Members: [Final quartet]: Ellen Jewett (violin); Akemi Takayama (violin); Doris Lederer (viola); Clyde Shaw (cello)
- Website: audubonquartet.com

The Audubon Quartet (1974-2011) was an American string quartet based at residencies at Marywood College in Scranton, Pennsylvania (1974-1979) and at Virginia Tech in Blacksburg, Virginia (1980-2001).

== Description ==
The Audubon Quartet was an internationally acclaimed American classical string quartet that came into existence in 1974, through the Young Artist Program at SUNY-Binghamton. The YAP was directed by violinist Peter Marsh of the Lenox String Quartet.

== History ==
The original Audubon Quartet was co-founded in 1974 by violinists Gregory Fulkerson, Janet Brady, violist Lawrence Bradford, and cellist Clyde Shaw. Former founding members Janet Brady and Lawrence Bradford are now deceased. [See www.audubonquartet.com]

During the nearly four-decade history of the Audubon Quartet, there were multiple personnel changes, with the final membership including violinists Ellen Jewett and Akemi Takayama, violist Doris Lederer and cellist Clyde Shaw.

Violinist David Ehrlich joined the Audubon Quartet in 1984, performing his first concert with the Quartet at the Music at Gretna summer festival in Mt. Gretna, Pennsylvania on August 5,1984. David Salness joined as second violinist in 1985 and was succeeded by Akemi Takayama in 1997.

During the nearly four-decade history of the Audubon Quartet, there were multiple personnel changes, with the final membership including violinists Ellen Jewett and Akemi Takayama, violist Doris Lederer and cellist Clyde Shaw. After the 2000 season, a decision was made to have the two quartet violinists alternate by switching roles, often during each concert.

The final concert of the Audubon Quartet was performed at the Chautauqua Institution on August 8, 2011, with a program ending with Dvorak's string quintet in E-flat major, Op. 97, with David Salness performing as guest violist.

During the history of the Audubon Quartet, the ensemble held three residencies. Marywood College (1974-1979), in Scranton Pennsylvania, Virginia Tech (1980-2001) in Blacksburg, Virginia, and Shenandoah University Conservatory (2007-2011), in Winchester, Virginia.

== Members ==
=== At time of dissolution ===
The membership of the Audubon Quartet at the end of its career, included violinists Ellen Jewett and Akemi Takayama, violist Doris Lederer and cellist Clyde Shaw.

=== Earlier ===
- 1974: Gregory Fulkerson (violin), Janet Brady (violin), Lawrence Bradford (viola), Clyde Shaw (cello)
- 1975: Ronald Copes (violin), Janet Brady (violin), Judith Geist (viola), Clyde Shaw (cello)
- 1976: Dennis Cleveland (violin), Janet Brady (violin), Doris Lederer (viola), Clyde Shaw (cello)
- 1978: Dennis Cleveland (violin), Sharon Smith (violin), Doris Lederer (viola), Clyde Shaw (cello)
- 1982: Toby Appel (violin), Sharon Smith Polifrone (violin), Doris Lederer (viola), Clyde Shaw (cello)
- 1983: Lawrence Shapiro (violin), Sharon Polifrone (violin), Doris Lederer (viola), Clyde Shaw (cello)
- 1984: David Ehrlich (violin), Sharon Polifrone (violin), Doris Lederer (viola), Clyde Shaw (cello)
- 1985: David Ehrlich (violin), David Salness (violin), Doris Lederer (viola), Clyde Shaw (cello)
- 1997: David Ehrlich (violin), Akemi Takayama (violin), Doris Lederer (viola), Clyde Shaw (cello)
- 2001: Ellen Jewett (violin), Akemi Takayama (violin), Doris Lederer (viola), Clyde Shaw (cello)

== Awards and recognition ==
The Audubon Quartet was the recipient of many first-time awards and special honors, including top prizes at three international string quartet competitions (1977-1979), being the first American string quartet to be invited by the Chinese Ministry of Culture to perform on the Mainland (1981), following the normalization of relations between the US and China, and an invitation to perform at the White House by President Jimmy Carter (1977). Additional experiences include several tours for the US Department of State and radio and television appearances, including a feature on CBS Sunday Morning (1979).

- The International String Quartet Competition in Evian, France (1977)
- The String Quartet Competition at the Festival Villa Lobos in Rio de Janeiro, Brazil (1977)
- The International String Quartet Competition in Portsmouth, England (1979)

== Selected discography and review ==
- String Quartets by Brian Fennelly and Leo Kraft, Orion Master Recordings (ORS 80398), 1980
- "The Ugly Duckling" by Jon Deak, Opus One Recordings (Stereo No. 77), 1982
- Flute Quartets of Joseph Haydn, Price-Less recordings (D 1077X), 1987
- String Quartets of Peter Schickele and Ezra Laderman, RCA Victor (7719-2-RC), 1988
- Music for Oboe and Strings by Bax, Bliss and Britten, Telarc Digital (CD-80205), 1989
- String Quartets of Ernst Dohnanyi, Centaur Records (CRC 2309), 1996
- Through the Prism of the Black Experience by David Baker, Liscio Records (LAS-11972), 1997
- String Quartets of Zoltan Kodaly, Centaur Records (CRC 2372), 1997
- String Quartets of Antonin Dvorak, Centaur Records (CRC 2416), 1999
- Chamber Music of Donald Erb, Composers Recordings (CD 857), 2000
- String Quartets of Peter Schickele, Centaur Records (CRC 2505), 2000
- Piano Quintets of Ernst von Dohnanyi, Centaur Records (CRC 2503), 2001
- String Quartets based on Music of Jerome Kern, Centaur Records (CRC 2724), 2005

== See also ==
- Ezra Laderman
- Peter Schickele
