= Audubon Park, Kentucky =

- City
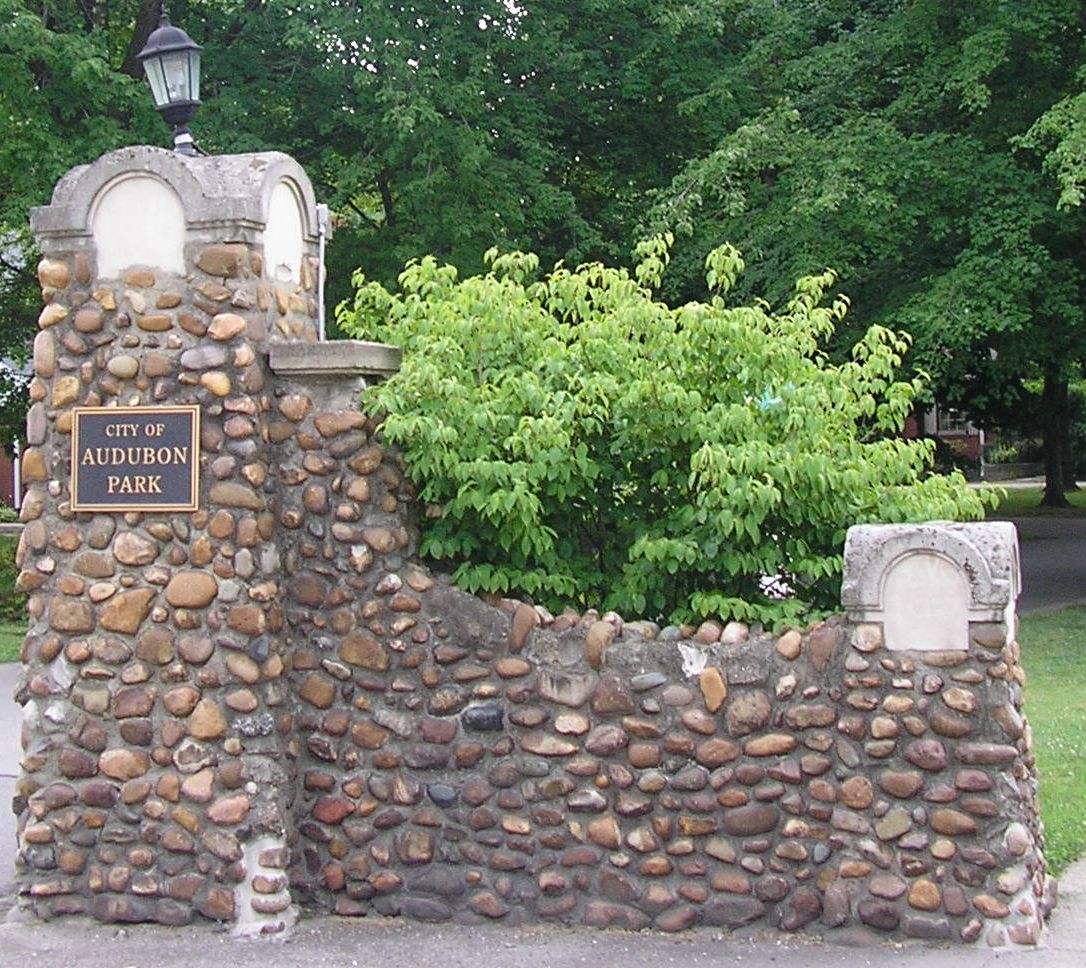
- Entrance pillars to Audubon Park

- Location of Audubon Park in Jefferson County, Kentucky

- Location in Kentucky Audubon Park (the United States)
- Coordinates: 38°12′18″N 85°43′37″W
- Country: United States
- State: Kentucky
- County: Jefferson

Area
  - Total: 0.32 sq mi (0.84 km^{2})
  - Land: 0.32 sq mi (0.84 km^{2})
  - Water: 0 sq mi (0.00 km^{2})
- Elevation: 505 ft (154 m)

Population (2020)
  - Total: 1,433
  - Density: 4,425.4/sq mi (1,708.66/km^{2})
- Time zone: UTC-5 (Eastern (EST))
  - Summer (DST): UTC-4 (EDT)
- ZIP Code: 40213
- FIPS code: 21-02656
- GNIS feature ID: 2403136
- Website: www.audubonparkky.gov
- Audubon Park Historic District
- U.S. National Register of Historic Places
- U.S. Historic district
- Location within Kentucky Location within the United States
- Location: Roughly bounded by Hess Ln. and Cardinal Dr. between Eagle Pss and Preston St., Audubon Park, Kentucky
- Area: 230 acres (93 ha)
- Built: 1912
- Architect: G. Robert Hunt; Harmon and Co.
- Architectural style: Tudor Revival; Colonial Revival; Bungalow/Craftsman
- MPS: Louisville and Jefferson County MPS
- NRHP reference No.: 96000430
- Added to NRHP: April 18, 1996

Audubon Park is a home rule-class city in central Jefferson County, Kentucky, United States. The population was 1,433 as of the 2020 census, down from 1,473 at the 2010 census. It is located about 5 miles (8 km) south of downtown Louisville and is surrounded on all sides by the city of Louisville.

== History ==
Audubon Park was developed residentially in the early 20th century on 230 acres (0.93 km^{2}) of hilly pastureland once owned by Gen. William Preston, who in turn had been granted the land in 1774 from the British government as payment for his services during the French and Indian War.

The land was sold to G. Robert Hunt in 1906, and the Audubon Park Country Club was built by avid golfer Russell Houston. The Audubon Park Realty Co. purchased the land in 1912 and named the neighborhood after wildlife painter John James Audubon. All but two of the city's 20 streets are named after birds.

Development was very slow until Louisville Gas and Electric laid gas mains and installed streetlights in the 1920s, at which point it was estimated that a new house was begun every two weeks. Most houses are traditional in design, with styles including Neo-colonial, Dutch colonial and Neo-federal, though some Craftsman-style California bungalows are present.

An early streetcar spur route ran to a station house near the center of the park (the station house has been converted to a private residence and still stands). The line was discontinued in the 1920s, although the tracks were not entirely removed until 1975. The city was formally incorporated by the state assembly in 1941.

The city is known for its straight, tree-lined streets (facilitated by rear utility lines where possible) and six small neighborhood parks. Its entrances are marked by large stone gateways. Two annual traditions are the spring dogwood festival, and the fall Arts and Crafts festival. The city was listed on the National Register of Historic Places in 1996.

== Geography ==
According to the United States Census Bureau, the city has a total area of 0.32 square miles (0.84 km^{2}), all land.

== Demographics ==
Historical population
Census	Pop.	Note	%±
1950	1,790		—
1960	1,867		4.3%
1970	1,862		−0.3%
1980	1,571		−15.6%
1990	1,520		−3.2%
2000	1,545		1.6%
2010	1,473		−4.7%
2020	1,433		−2.7%
U.S. Decennial Census

As of the census of 2000, there were 1,545 people, 619 households, and 433 families residing in the city. The population density was 4,788.6 inhabitants per square mile (1,848.9/km^{2}). There were 634 housing units at an average density of 1,965.0 per square mile (758.7/km^{2}). The racial makeup of the city was 98.19% White, 0.26% Black or African American, 0.06% Native American, 0.45% Asian, 0.00% Pacific Islander, 0.13% from other races, and 0.91% from two or more races. 0.52% of the population were Hispanic or Latino of any race.

There were 619 households, out of which 30.9% had children under the age of 18 living with them, 59.0% were married couples living together, 7.6% had a female householder with no husband present, and 30.0% were non-families. 26.0% of all households were made up of individuals, and 16.0% had someone living alone who was 65 years of age or older. The average household size was 2.50 and the average family size was 3.05.

In the city, the population was spread out, with 25.2% under the age of 18, 6.2% from 18 to 24, 24.1% from 25 to 44, 27.0% from 45 to 64, and 17.5% who were 65 years of age or older. The median age was 42 years. For every 100 females, there were 94.3 males. For every 100 females age 18 and over, there were 86.2 males.

The median income for a household in the city was $60,000, and the median income for a family was $75,520. Males had a median income of $51,167 versus $32,679 for females. The per capita income for the city was $31,162. 5.1% of the population and 3.7% of families were below the poverty line. 3.9% of those under the age of 18 and 7.8% of those 65 and older were living below the poverty line.

== Climate ==
The climate in this area is characterized by hot, humid summers and generally mild to cool winters. According to the Köppen Climate Classification system, Audubon Park has a humid subtropical climate, abbreviated "Cfa" on climate maps.

== See also ==
- National Register of Historic Places listings in Jefferson County, Kentucky
