= Autopista =

An autopista is a controlled-access highway in various Spanish-speaking countries

- List of highways in Argentina includes autopistas of Argentina
- List of autopistas and autovías in Spain
- List of Mexican autopistas
- Autopistas of Puerto Rico
- List of Chilean freeways
- Autopistas of Cuba
