= Clotilde García del Castillo (painting) =

1890 painting by Joaquín Sorolla

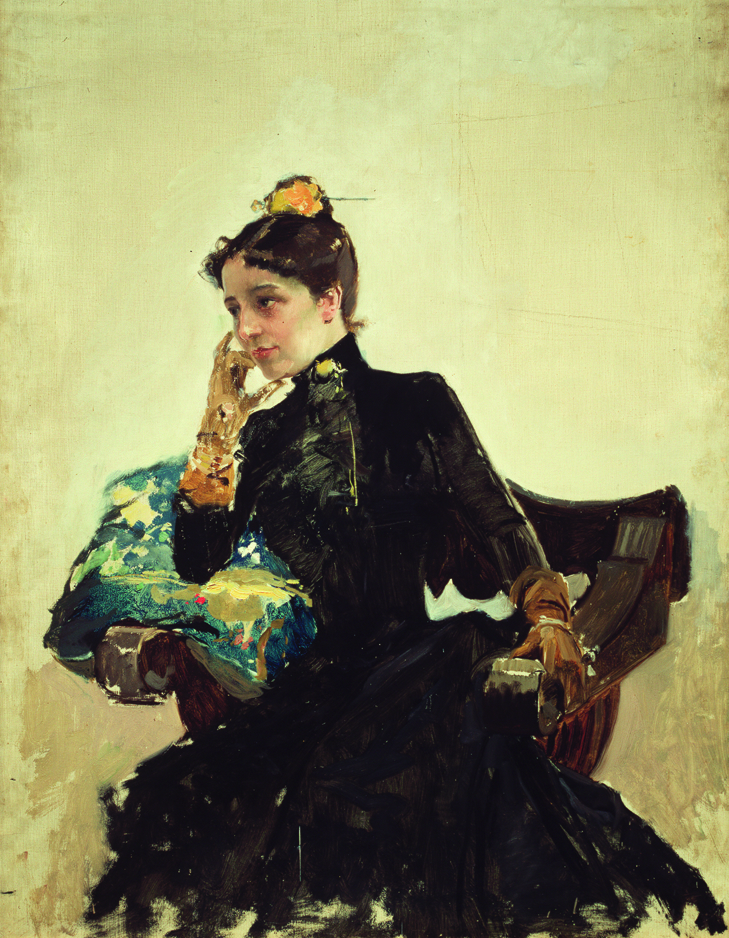
- Artist: Joaquín Sorolla
- Year: 1890
- Medium: oil on canvas
- Dimensions: 124.50 cm × 97.50 cm (49.02 in × 38.39 in)
- Location: Sorolla Museum, Madrid

Clotilde García del Castillo is an 1890 oil-on-canvas painting by the Spanish painter Joaquín Sorolla. It is part of the collection of the Sorolla Museum, in Madrid.

== Description ==
It is a portrait by Sorolla of his wife, Clotilde García del Castillo. In the painting, she is depicted sitting on a wooden chair, clad in an elegant black dress (a sort of a high neck gown) with brown gloves, posing for the painting with a tilted posture on the right, her right hand firmly rested on a pillow kept on the chair and her fingers touching her cheek and chin while her left hand rests on the armrest. Her hair is bound at the top of her head and crowned with a yellow flower. The light and neutral background of the canvas removes any notion of perspective, following a technique used by Diego Velázquez.

== See also ==
- Señora de Sorolla in Black
- Walk on the Beach
