= Mother (painting) =

1895 painting by Joaquín Sorolla

- Madre
- Artist: Joaquín Sorolla
- Year: 1895
- Completion date: 1900
- Medium: oil on canvas
- Subject: Clotilde García del Castillo and Elena Sorolla
- Dimensions: 125 cm x 169 cm (49 in x 66 in)

Mother (Spanish: Madre) is an oil-on-canvas painting by the Spanish artist Joaquín Sorolla, started in 1895 and completed in 1900, depicting his wife, Clotilde García del Castillo, and their newborn daughter, Elena Sorolla. The painting is part of the Sorolla Museum in Madrid.

== Description ==
Mother commemorates the birth of Sorolla and García del Castillo's daughter, Elena, on 12 July 1895, though the painting itself was not completed until 1900. The painting depicts García del Castillo and Elena lying down in a bed, almost completely covered by a large white bedspread, with the exception of their heads. García del Castillo's gaze is towards Elena.

Mother has been described as a minimalist composition with similarities to Catalan modernism, incorporating "impressionist ideas" with "old-fashioned figurative painting". Contemporary photographs suggest that in early versions of the painting, García del Castillo was looking directly at the viewer; in the final painting, she is facing Elena. While Sorolla himself is absent from the painting, the "emotion of the father" has been described as being blended into Mother through the use of filtered light and whiteness from which García del Castillo and Elena's faces emerge, softening the image.

Mother is on display at the Sorolla Museum in Madrid. The Museum of Impressionisms described Madre as a "composition of profound gravity and masterful artistic interpretation". The painting has been contrasted to Sorolla's other work, described as a "break away from convention" and a "standout" from his career, capturing his "loving and respectful vision of motherhood".
