= Contadina de Asís =

1888 painting by Joaquín Sorolla

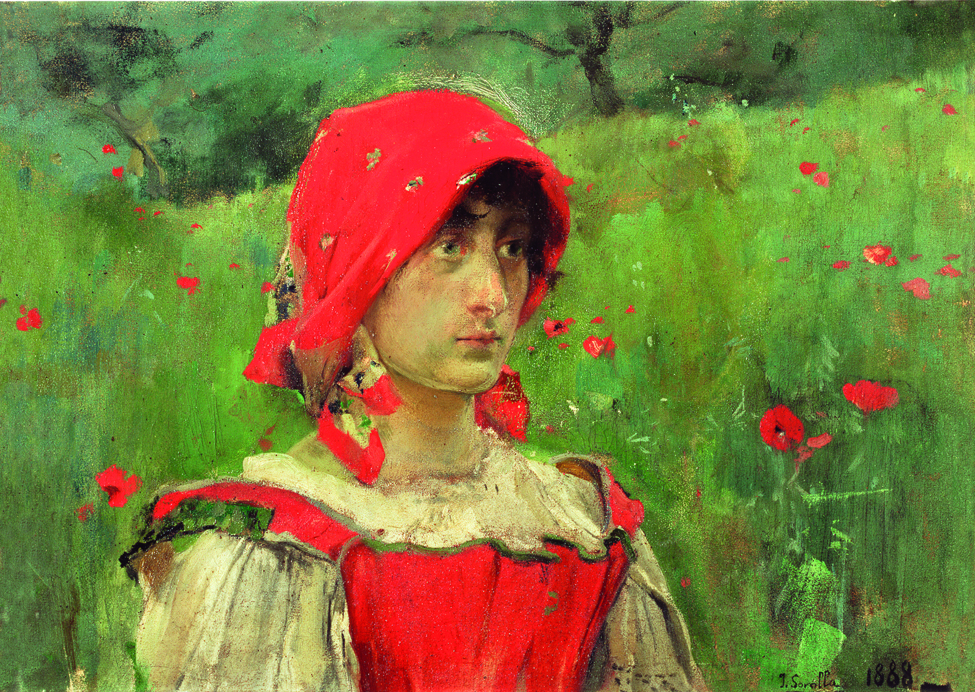
- Artist: Joaquín Sorolla
- Year: 1888
- Medium: oil on canvas
- Dimensions: 39.50 cm × 55.50 cm (15.55 in × 21.85 in)
- Location: Sorolla Museum, Madrid

Contadina de Asís is an 1888 oil-on-canvas painting by the Spanish painter Joaquín Sorolla, from 1888. It is part of the collection of the Sorolla Museum, in Madrid.

== Description ==
It was painted in 1888, at a small town of Assisi in Italy, after the retirement of the painter. He always wanted to paint natural and realistic beauty. It is a feminine portrait of a peasant woman standing in a landscape full of vegetation and dotted with poppies. The woman appears to be slightly turning her head to the right. She wears a red scarf, which covers her head and is knotted at the nape of her neck, and a matching red bodice over a white blouse.

The painting uses bright natural colours with an ease of brush work.
