= Señora de Sorolla in Black =

1906 painting by Joaquín Sorolla

- Clotilde con traje negro (Spanish)
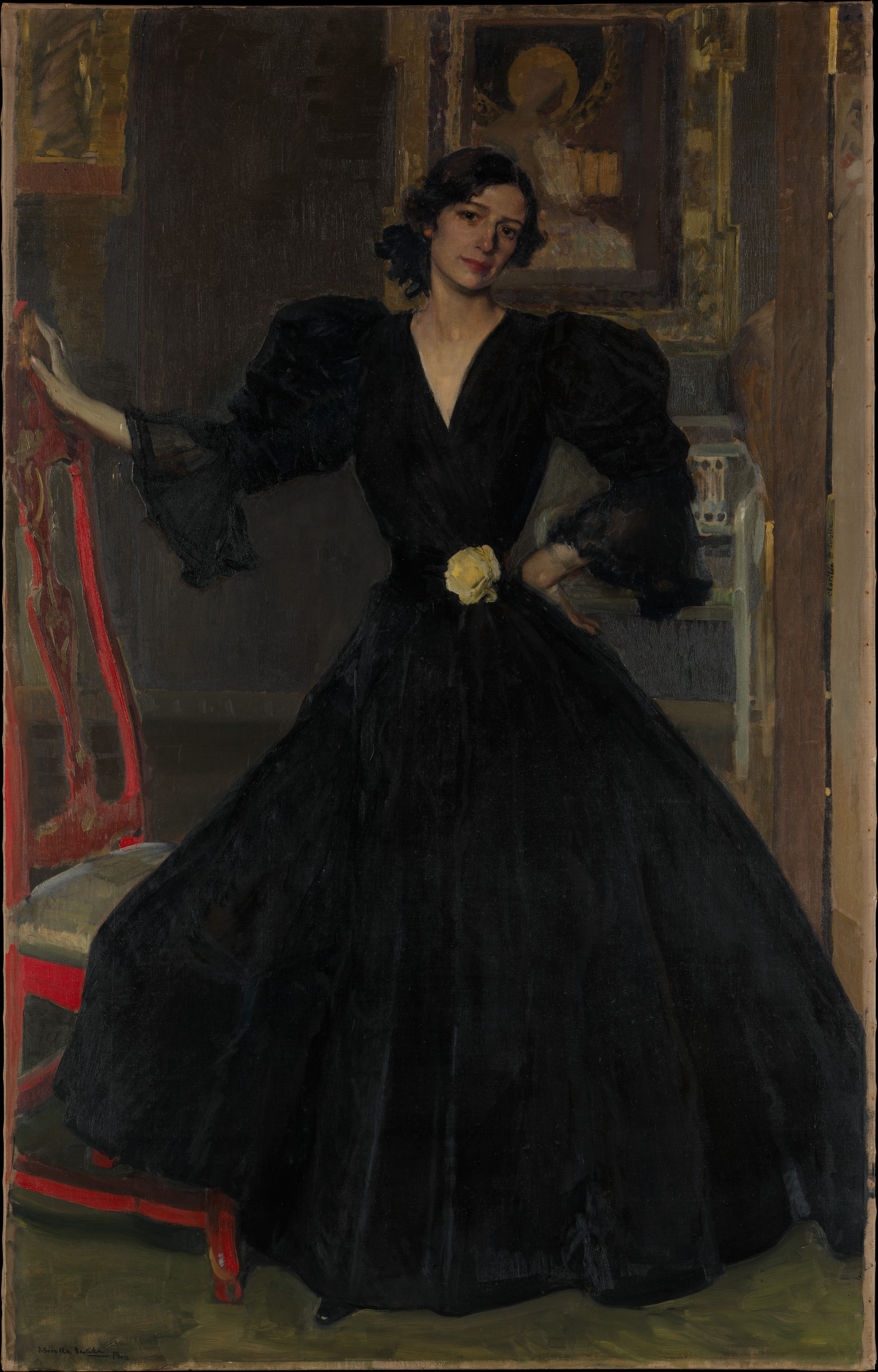
- Artist: Joaquín Sorolla
- Year: 1906
- Medium: Oil on canvas
- Subject: Clotilde García del Castillo
- Dimensions: 186.7 cm × 118.7 cm (73.5 in × 46.7 in)
- Location: Metropolitan Museum of Art, New York
- Accession: 09.71.3

Señora de Sorolla in Black is a painting created in 1906 by Spanish artist Joaquín Sorolla. It is part of the collection of the Metropolitan Museum of Art, in New York.

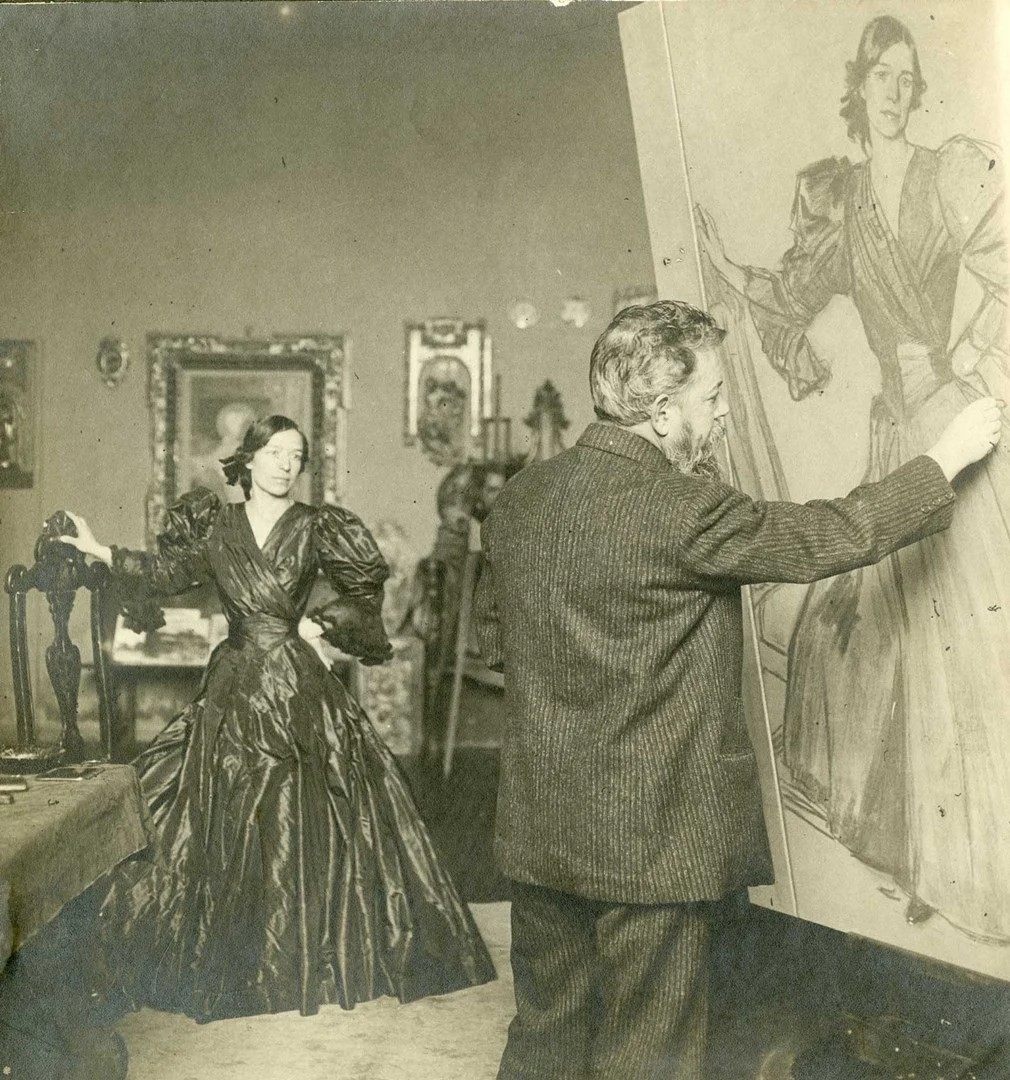
Sorolla painting Señora de Sorolla in Black in 1905, photographed by Christian Franzen

Done in oil on canvas, the work depicts Clotilde García del Castillo, Sorolla's wife, confidante, travel companion and muse. The painting shows Clotilde wearing a black dress in their Madrid home. In the background, Sorolla has rendered a smaller version of one of his earlier paintings.

The work is on view at the Metropolitan Museum in Gallery 827.

== See also ==
- Clotilde García del Castillo (painting)
- Walk on the Beach
