= Clotilde García del Castillo =

Wife and muse of Joaquín Sorolla (1865–1929)

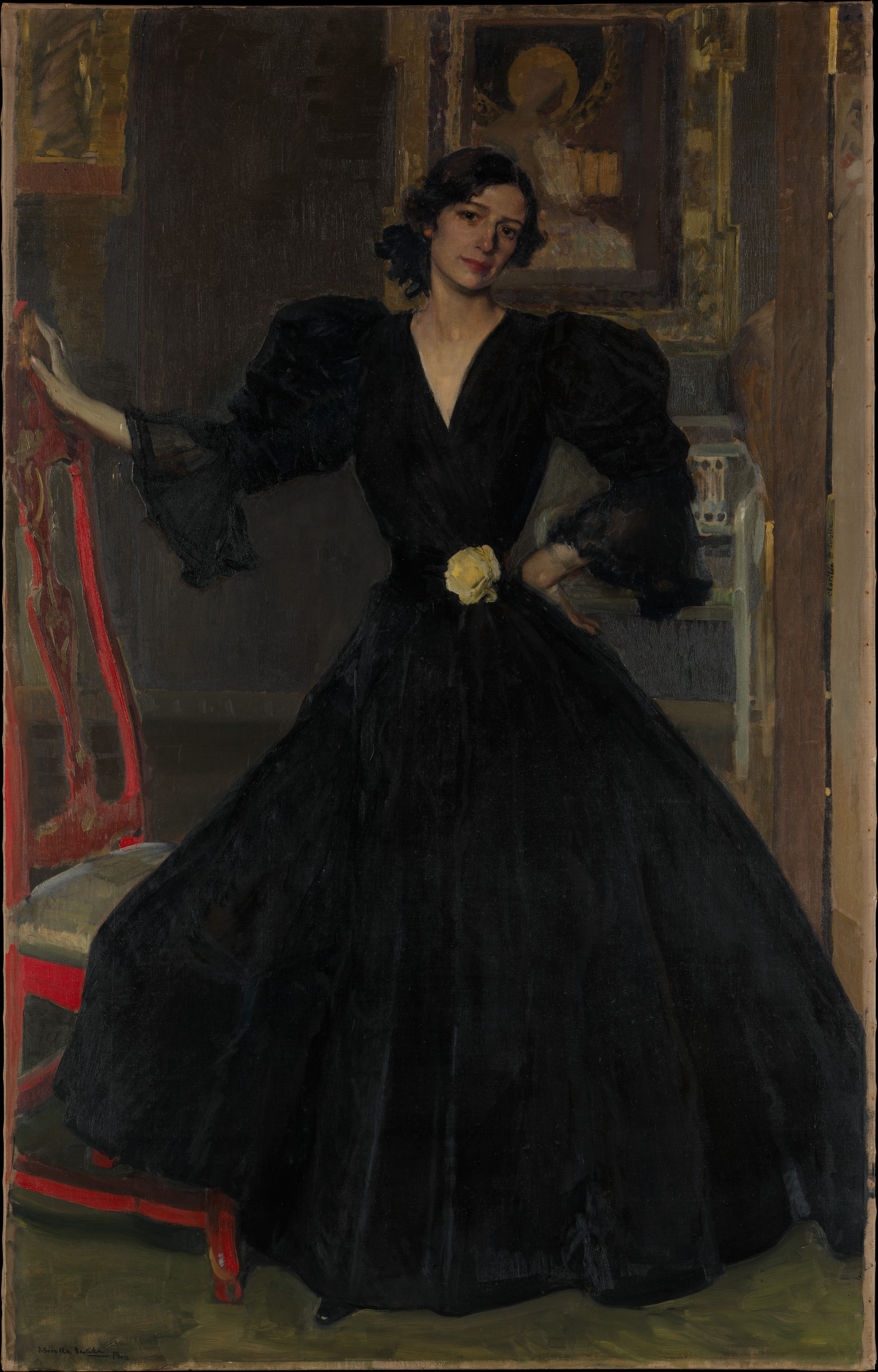
- Señora de Sorolla in Black (1906) by Joaquín Sorolla
- Born: 5 January 1865; Valencia, Spain
- Died: 5 January 1929 (aged 64); Madrid, Spain
- Known for: Wife and muse of Joaquín Sorolla
- Spouse: Joaquín Sorolla (married 1888)
- Children: 3, including Elena

Clotilde García del Castillo (5 January 1865 – 5 January 1929) was a Spanish woman who was the wife and muse of Joaquín Sorolla. Born and raised in Valencia, she first became acquainted with Sorolla through his relationships with her father and brother. García del Castillo and Sorolla married in 1888 and had three children together. Despite periods of separation due to the needs of their family, García del Castillo was an advocate for her husband's work, serving as both his muse and organising his exhibitions and finances. Following Sorolla's death in 1923, García del Castillo bequeathed his work to the Spanish state, establishing the Sorolla Museum at their former home in Madrid.

== Early life ==
García del Castillo was born on 5 January 1865 in Valencia, Spain, to Antonio García Peris, a photographer, and his wife, Clotilde del Castillo. She had one brother and four sisters. García del Castillo's brother, Juan Antonio, attended the Real Academia de Bellas Artes de San Carlos de Valencia, where he met and befriended Joaquín Sorolla, a fellow art student. Sorolla went on to work for García Peris at his photography studio, where he first met García del Castillo in 1879.

== Marriage ==
After studying in Paris and Rome under and alongside Spanish painters including Francisco Pradilla y Ortiz, Emilio Sala and José Villegas, Sorolla returned to Spain, where he and García del Castillo married at the Iglesia de San Martín y San Antonio in Valencia on 8 September 1888. Following the wedding, the couple resided in Assisi for a time before returning to Spain by 1890, settling in a home on the Plaza de Tirso de Molina in Madrid with hopes of attaining greater visibility for Sorolla's work.

=== Motherhood ===
García del Castillo and Soralla's first child, María Clotilde, was born in 1890. While spending Christmas with García del Castillo's family in Valencia, María Clotilde fell ill. This led to the couple separating for the first time, with García del Castillo remaining with her family in Valencia to care for María Clotilde while Sorolla returned to Madrid to work. Their second child, Joaquín, was born in November 1892, in Valencia. García del Castillo remained in the city, where she had the support of her family, while Sorolla spent increasingly long periods carrying out commissioned work in Madrid. During these periods of separation, García del Castillo and Sorolla exchanged regular letters to one another. The correspondence, which includes declarations of love and illustrates García del Castillo's support of her husband's career, were later exhibited at the Sorolla Museum. Sorolla regularly visited Valencia, where he completed notable paintings including The Return from Fishing: Hauling the Boat and ¡Aún dicen que el pescado es caro!.

In 1895, García del Castillo and Sorolla's third child, Elena, was born in Valencia; Sorolla was working in Paris at the time. Elena would go on to become a well-known painter and sculptor in her own right. In 1904, the entire family relocated to a new home on the calle Miguel Ángel in Madrid, where García del Castillo ran the household in addition to taking control of the administrative aspects of Sorolla's career, including arranging exhibitions – including the first solo exhibition of Sorolla's work, in Paris – and managing his finances. Sorolla went on to describe her as his "treasury minister".

=== Support of Sorolla's career ===
While García del Castillo played a more active role in her husband's career following her and the children's relocation to Madrid from Valencia, she and Sorolla continued to have periods of separation due to the needs of their family. In 1907, after María Clotilde was diagnosed with tuberculosis, García del Castillo temporarily relocated with her to El Pardo to help with her recovery. As a result, she was unable to support with a planned series of exhibitions of Sorolla's work in Germany; the subsequent exhibitions, held in Berlin, Düsseldorf and Cologne, where not as successful as had been hoped. Similarly, in 1913, García del Castillo temporarily relocated to London with Elena to care for Joaquín, who had been injured in a motorcycle accident.

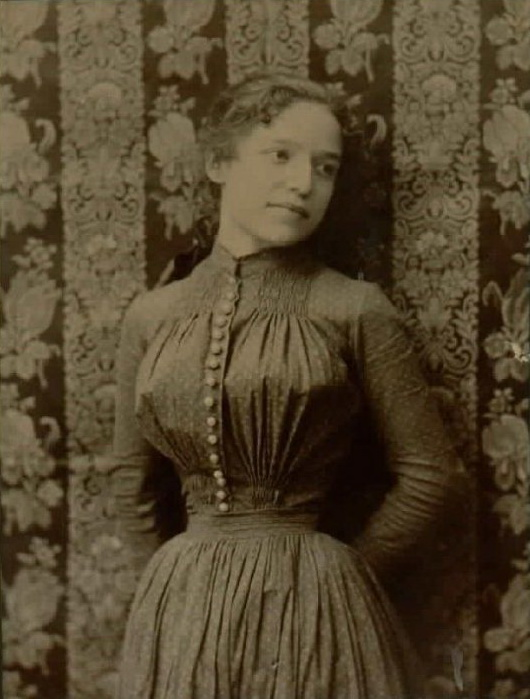
García del Castillo, photographed by her father in 1886

In 1909, the entire family travelled to New York City, where Sorolla's work was displayed as part of the inaugural exhibition of the Hispanic Society of America, curated by Archer Milton Huntington. Señora de Sorolla in Black, a 1906 painting of García del Castillo, was subsequently acquired by the Metropolitan Museum of Art. Over the following years, the family moved around Spain, in addition to Chicago and St. Louis in the United States, to support Sorolla with preparing for and holding exhibitions of his work. The family later settled in a purpose-built home on the paseo del General Martínez Campos in Madrid, which would later go on to become the Sorolla Museum.

=== Familial losses ===
After a period of residency in Seville, the family returned to Valencia in 1918 following the death of García del Castillo's father; her mother later died in 1921, shortly after Elena's marriage to painter Francisco Pons Arnau. In 1920, Sorolla himself had suffered a stroke while painting a portrait of Ramón Pérez de Ayala's wife Mabel. García del Castillo took a step back from administrating Sorolla's career to care for him, with Joaquín taking over the organisation of a planned exhibition of Sorolla's work in New York City. García del Castillo and Sorolla moved to Cercedilla to assist with Sorolla's recovery; he died there in 1923.

== Widowhood ==
Following Sorolla's death, García del Castillo continued to work as the administrator of her husband's estate. Notably, she bequeathed all of his work, as well as their home and other assets, to the Spanish government. This made Sorolla's work among the first artwork to become national assets, with García del Castillo one of Spain's first benefactors. García del Castillo convinced her children to donate their own artworks of their father to what would become the Sorolla Museum at their former home in Madrid.

García del Castillo died on her 64th birthday on 5 January 1929, in Madrid.

== Appearances in Sorolla's art ==
Mother (1895)

As Sorolla's muse, García del Castillo featured in many of his paintings. Notably, in 1890's Clotilde García del Castillo, she appears seated on a wooden chair wearing a black dress. Other paintings featuring García del Castillo by name include Clotilde Contemplating the Venus de Milo (1897), Clotilde in a White Dress and Clotilde with a Spanish Mantilla (both 1902), and Señora de Sorolla in Black (1906).

In 1895, following the birth of their third child, Elena, Sorolla began working on the painting Mother, which was completed in 1900. The painting, which was retrospectively described as a "loving and respectful vision of motherhood", featured García del Castillo and Elena lying in bed.

The 1902 nude painting Desnudo de mujer, which features a naked woman with her back to the viewer, is said to be of García del Castillo.
