= Palacio de las Cortes, Madrid =

Coordinates: 40°24′59″N 3°41′48″W

Palacio de las Cortes
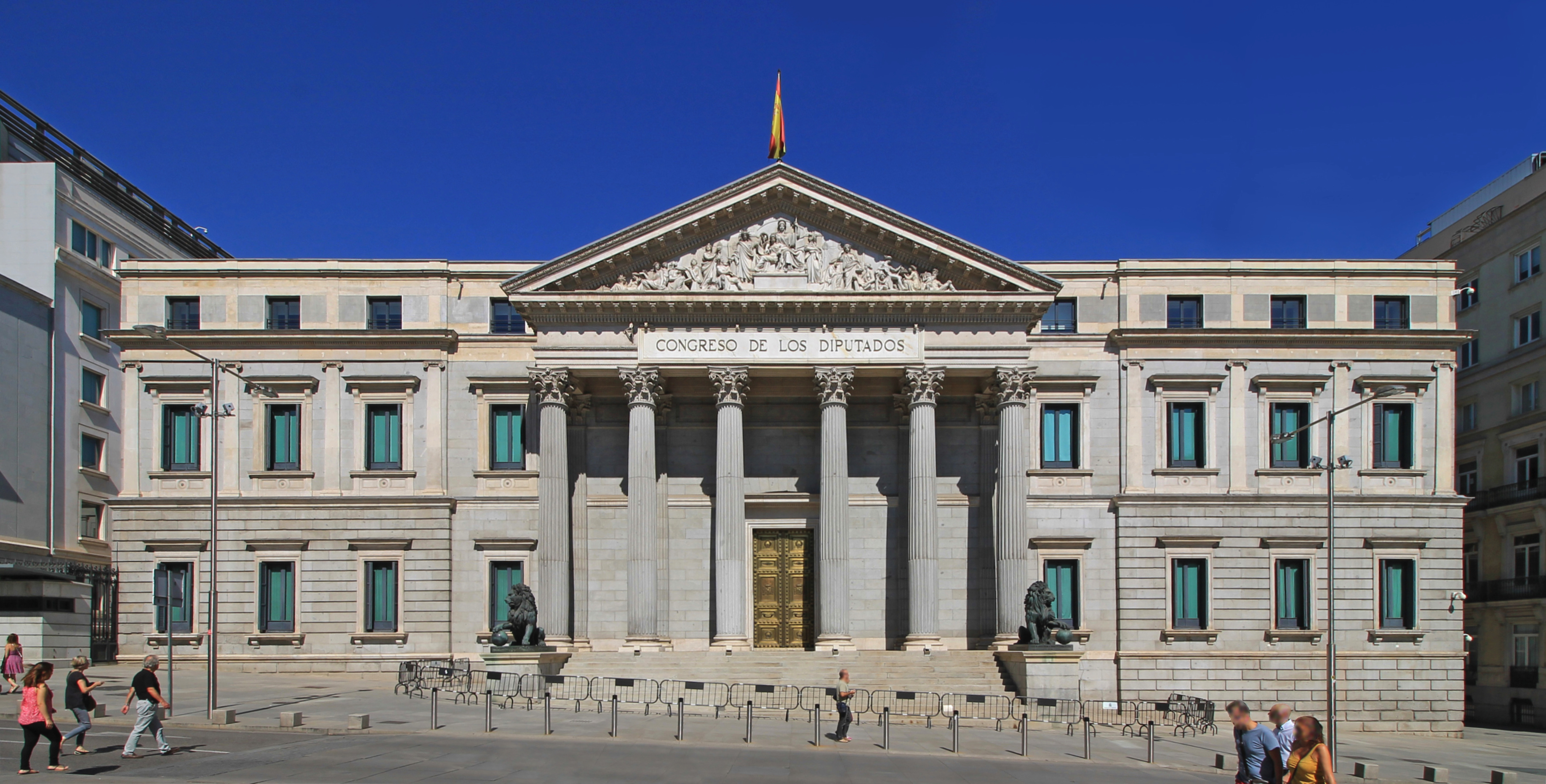
- Main façade
- Interactive map of the Palacio de las Cortes area

General information
- Architectural style: Neoclassical
- Location: Madrid, Spain
- Construction started: 1843; 183 years ago
- Completed: 1850; 176 years ago

Design and construction
- Architect: Narciso Pascual Colomer

The Palace of the Cortes (Spanish: Palacio de las Cortes), also known as the Palace of the Congress of Deputies, is the building that houses the Congress of Deputies, one of the two chambers of the Cortes Generales, the Spanish Parliament. It is located in Plaza de las Cortes in Madrid, between Zorrilla Street and Carrera de San Jerónimo, a short distance from Paseo del Prado. It is one of the emblematic buildings of 19th-century Madrid, built in a neoclassical style.

== History ==
The site where the Palace of the Cortes now stands was previously occupied by the Convent of the Holy Spirit, belonging to the Order of Clerics Regular Minor, which was severely damaged by a fire in 1823.

With the advent of the liberal regime in 1834, the moderate government of Francisco Martínez de la Rosa decided to hold parliamentary sessions temporarily in the conventual church. When the Progressive Party took power, they decided to build a new structure to replace the religious building, in front of Plaza de las Cortes.

The project was designed and executed by the architect Narciso Pascual Colomer, with construction beginning on October 10, 1843, and the building being inaugurated on October 31, 1850, by Queen Isabella II. During the seven years of construction, the deputies had to meet in the Ballroom of the Royal Theatre of Madrid.

=== Subsequent Expansions ===
In the 1980s, the building underwent its first expansion, led by the architect Antonio Cámara. The extension was built on an adjacent block where the Hospital of the Italians had stood between 1598 and 1885, and it was connected to the original structure via a bridge over Floridablanca Street. The extension was inaugurated by King Juan Carlos I and Queen Sofía on May 28, 1980.

Later, in 1994, another expansion and renovation took place following a competition in which 287 proposals were submitted. The winning design was by María Rubert de Ventós, Josep Parcerisa, and Oriol Clos, who finalized the project together with Mariano Bayón and Justo F. Isasi.

The most recent expansion, completed on June 1, 2006, involved incorporating the former headquarters of two banks—the Banco Exterior de España and the Banco de Crédito Industrial (Casa de Rivas)—a project carried out by the Cano Lasso studio.

In 2009, during sanitation and restoration work in the basement of the Congress of Deputies, ancient human remains were discovered. One hypothesis suggests they may have come from a cemetery belonging to the former convent.

In 2013, renovation work on the building revealed issues with the roof structure, which was causing leaks in the Session Hall.

== Historical Events ==
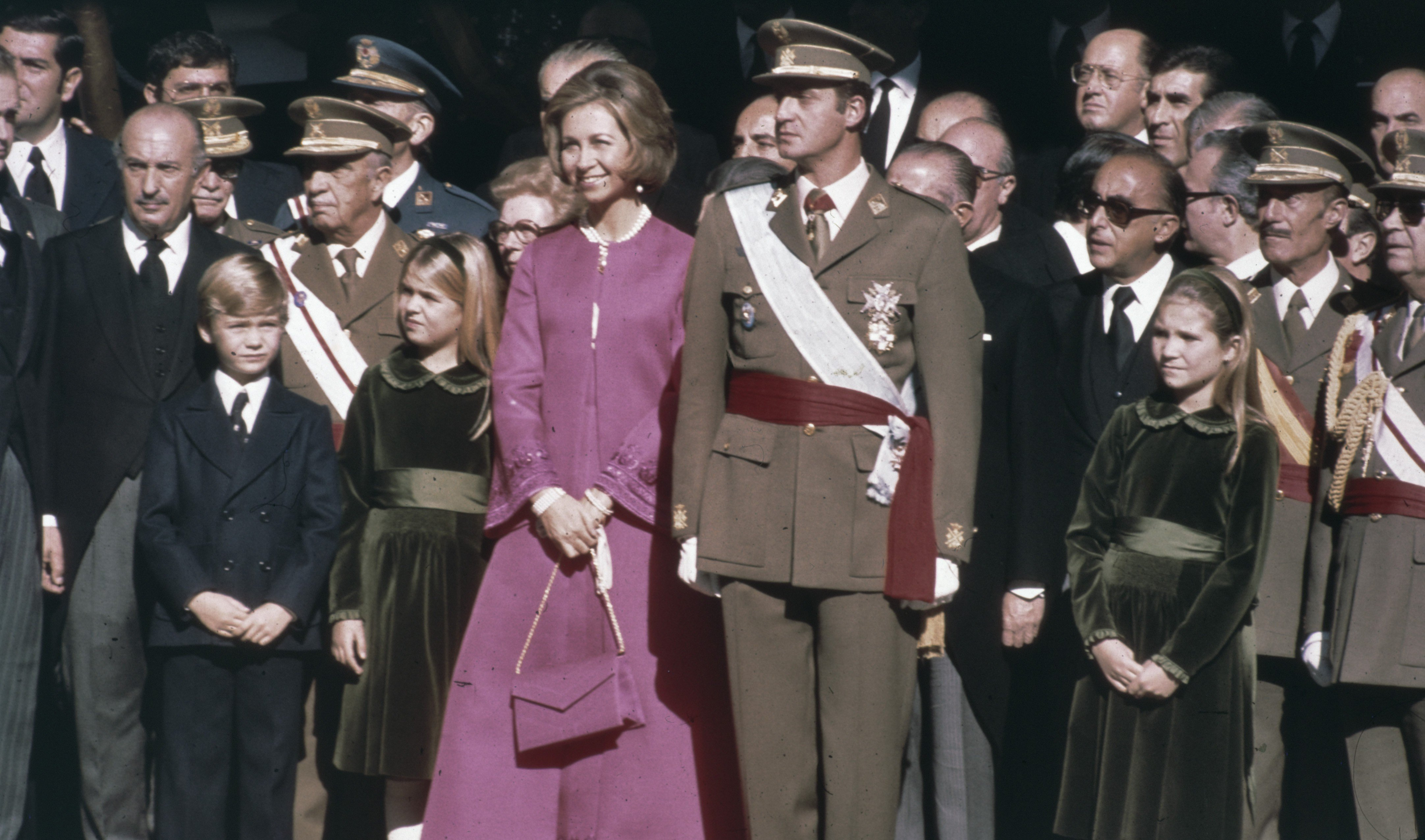
The proclamation of Prince Juan Carlos as King of Spain in a special meeting of the Cortes, the Spanish parliament, on November 22nd, 1975. Juan Carlos, his wife and children are leaving after the ceremony.

The Palace of the Cortes has been the setting for some of Spain’s most significant political events in the 19th and 20th centuries. These include:

- The proclamations of King Juan Carlos I (1975) and King Felipe VI (2014).
- The formal openings of legislative sessions.
- The state funerals of former presidents Leopoldo Calvo-Sotelo and Adolfo Suárez.
- The attempted coup d'état on February 23, 1981.

== Building Description ==
=== Main Façade ===
The main façade faces Carrera de San Jerónimo, one of Madrid’s principal streets. Despite its mid-19th-century construction, it is considered one of the masterpieces of Spanish neoclassicism and the most famous work of its architect, Narciso Pascual y Colomer.

The architect designed the façade in the style of a Renaissance palace, with two floors—the first with rusticated stonework and the second featuring windows with triangular pediments. As a grand entrance, he designed a large portico with six Corinthian columns, supporting a triangular pediment adorned with a bas-relief depicting Spain with the Constitution, flanked by allegorical figures representing Strength, Justice, Liberty, Valor, Science, Harmony, Fine Arts, Agriculture, Commerce, Rivers, Abundance, and Peace. This masterpiece was created by the sculptor Ponciano Ponzano.

In front of the portico, there is a monumental staircase, flanked by the two iconic bronze lions sculpted by Ponciano Ponzano in 1866. The lions were cast using cannons captured in the 1860 African War. Popular culture has named them Daoiz and Velarde, in honor of the two captains who died in the May 2, 1808 uprising against the French. The lion dubbed Daoiz is missing its scrotal sac, variously attributed to a sculpting error, a lack of materials, or other unknown reasons. In 2012, the History Channel proposed funding the restoration of the missing part, but the request was ultimately denied for historical preservation and safety reasons.

=== Interior Spaces ===
==== Session Hall ====
The most well-known room in the Palace, the Session Hall (Hemiciclo, hemicycle), is a semicircular chamber where the Congress of Deputies meets.

At the front of the chamber, a tapestry featuring the Spanish coat-of-arms is flanked by two Carrara marble statues of the Catholic Monarchs. On either side, two large paintings depict historic moments:

- "María de Molina Presents Her Son Fernando IV to the Cortes of Valladolid (1295)" – painted by Antonio Gisbert in 1863.
- "The Oath of the Deputies of the Cádiz Cortes (1812)" – painted by José Casado del Alisal in 1863.

Above the presidium, four sculpted figures represent the Navy, Agriculture, Commerce, and Science, created by Sabino Medina. The chamber is topped by a glass-domed ceiling, with a central painting depicting Queen Isabella II surrounded by historical figures such as El Cid, Christopher Columbus, and Miguel de Cervantes, created by Carlos Luis de Ribera.

Visible bullet holes from the 1981 attempted coup can still be seen in the walls and ceiling.

==== Hall of Conferences (Hall of Lost Steps) ====
Located in a straight line from the main entrance, the Hall of Conferences, also known as the Hall of Lost Steps, is richly decorated in the Isabelline style, with neo-Plateresque stucco moldings and a spectacular glass dome featuring allegorical paintings.

Its walls display twelve paintings representing Spain’s historic kingdoms, major cities, and rivers (Ebro, Tajo, Duero, and Guadalquivir), created by Vicente Camarón. Busts of 19th-century politicians in marble are placed in the corners.

The central table, made of agate with bronze and mother-of-pearl decorations, was donated by Queen Isabella II. Hanging from the ceiling are two large crystal chandeliers.

=== Library and Archives ===
The Library, designed by Arturo Mélida in 1889, is housed in a three-story space and holds around 210,000 volumes. It serves as the official archive of the Spanish Parliament.
