= Elena Sorolla =

Spanish painter

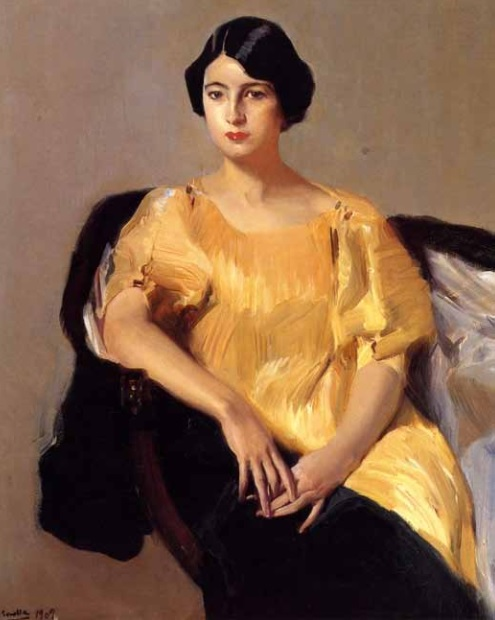
- Elena dressed in a yellow tunic by her father Joaquín Sorolla. 1909.
- Born: Elena Sorolla García; 12 July 1895; Valencia, Spain
- Died: 17 March 1975 (aged 79); Alaior, Spain
- Occupations: Painter, sculptor
- Years active: 1916–1926
- Parents: Joaquín Sorolla (father); Clotilde García del Castillo (mother)

Elena Sorolla García (first name often signed Helena; 12 July 1895 – 17 March 1975) was an early 20th-century Spanish sculptor and painter. She devoted her youth to sculpture, having a brief career that she left behind to dedicate herself to her family after marrying Victoriano Lorente in 1922. Most of her works are part of private collections, with the exception of some that belong to the Sorolla Museum. She was the youngest daughter of painter Joaquín Sorolla and curator Clotilde García del Castillo.

== Career ==
Elena Sorolla studied at the Institución Libre de Enseñanza. From an early age she took an interest in sculpture, unlike her older siblings María and Joaquín who favored painting. Among her teachers were José Capuz and Mariano Benlliure, both sculptors who belonged to her father's inner circle. Similarly, she attended the studio where her father's students worked. She produced most of her work between 1916 and 1926. She participated in several exhibitions and competitions in Spain, such as the Valencian Youth Art Exhibition in 1917, an exhibition at the Musée de l'Hotel de la Ville in Bordeaux in 1919, and the Art Exhibition of 1922 held at the Palace of Fine Arts – Parc de la Ciutadella in Barcelona, organized by the Municipal Exhibition Board. In 1926, together with her sister María Sorolla, she held the only joint personal exhibition at Madrid's Lyceum Club Femenino, which from 1926 to 1936 served as an association center for educated women in the city. She put aside her artistic career due to her dedication to family and changes of residence, although she did create some portraits of her children and a bust of each of them.

Her favorite subjects were portraits and the female body, working in marble, bronze, and wood. Her work stands out for its technical quality, with a great fidelity of personal traits.

== In the work of Joaquín Sorolla and other artists ==
Her father Joaquín Sorolla painted her in several of his works, such as Elena con túnica amarilla and Elena en la playa, both in 1909, and with her sister María in María y Elena en la playa in 1904. The first time her father portrayed her in a painting was in Mother, in which her head protrudes from the sheets next to her mother Clotilde.

José Capuz also made a sculptural portrait of Elena in 1921, shortly before her marriage, which is exhibited at the Sorolla Museum.

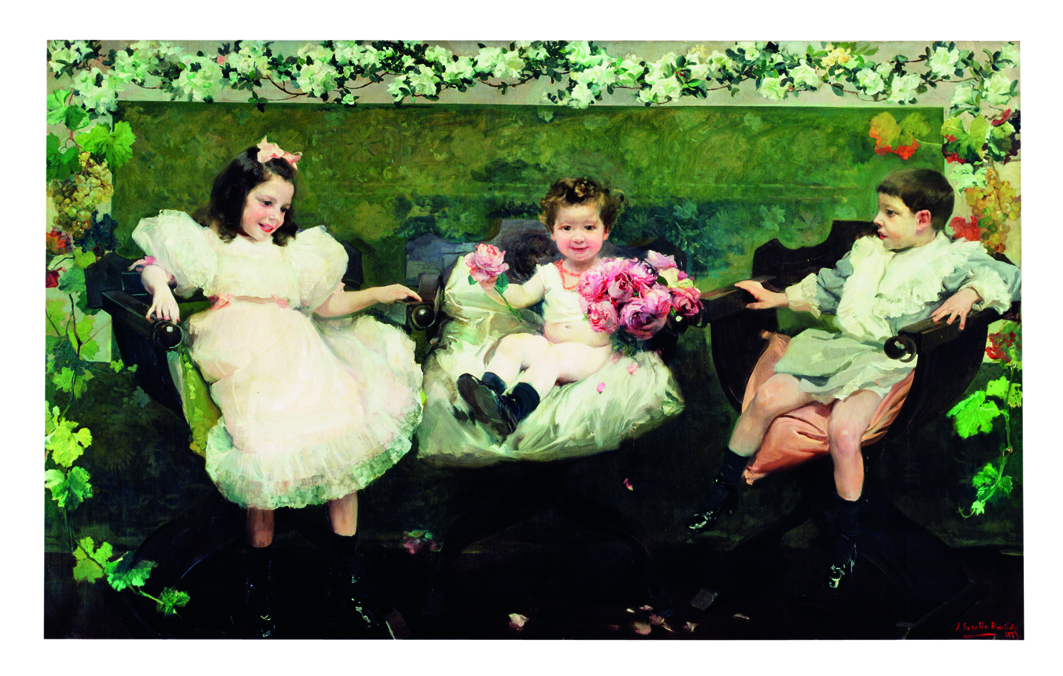
Mis chicos by Joaquín Sorolla (1897)

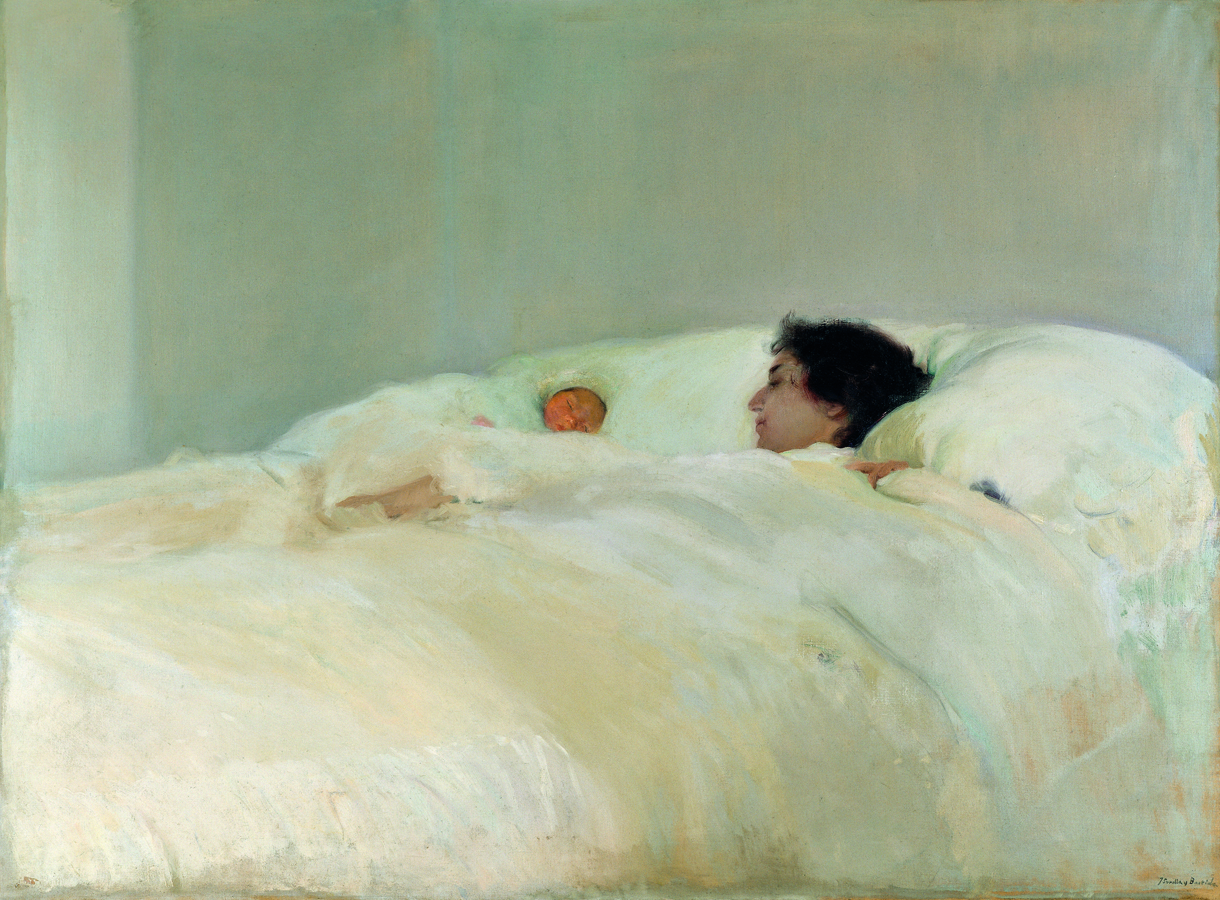
Mother by Joaquín Sorolla (1900)

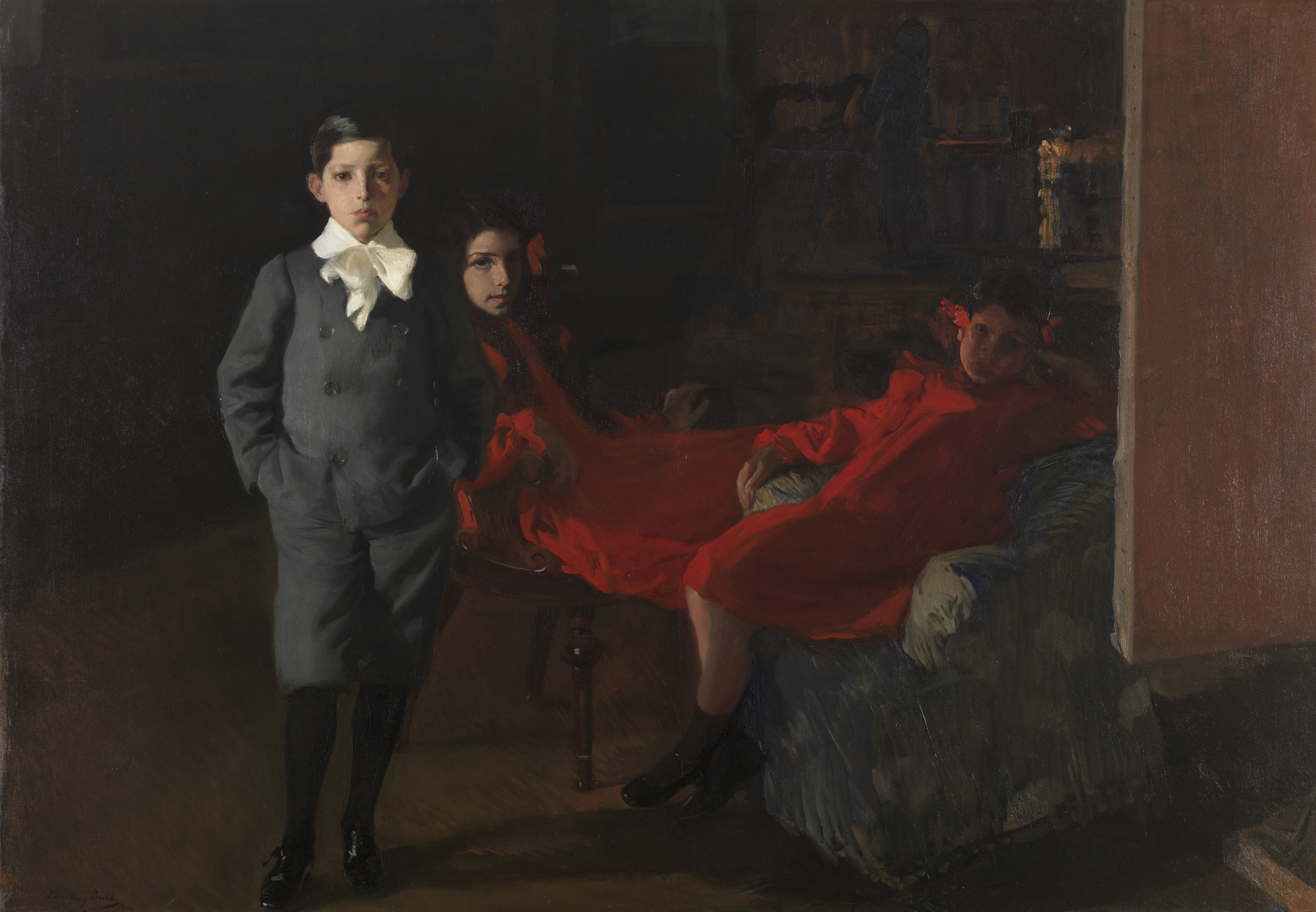
Mis hijos by Joaquín Sorolla (1904)

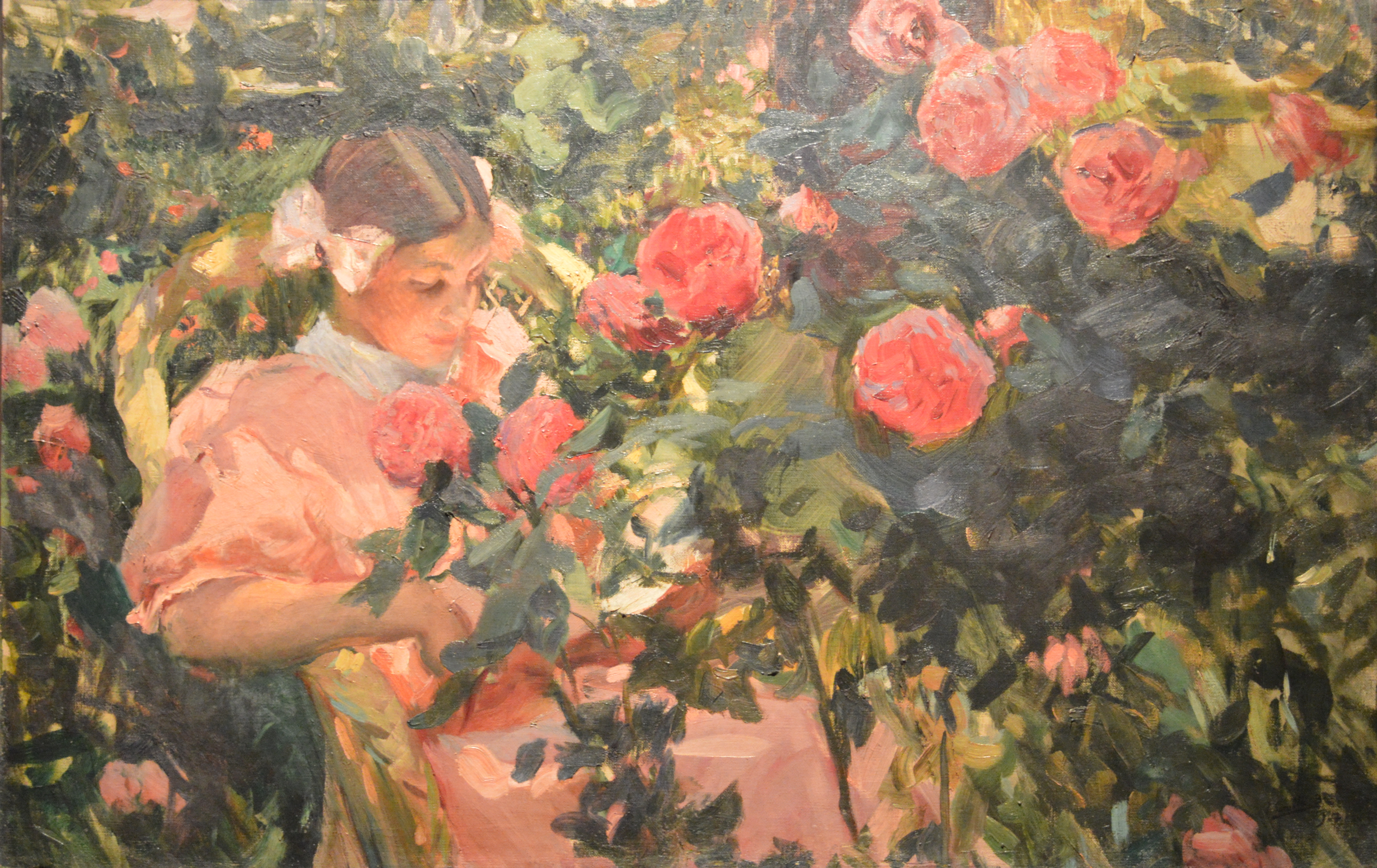
Elena entre rosas by Joaquín Sorolla (1907)

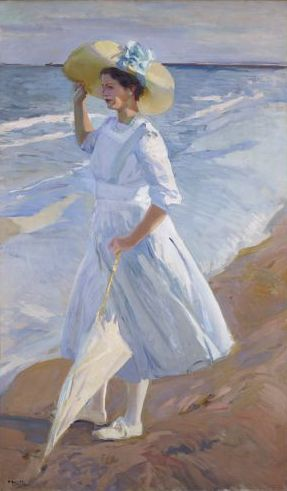
Elena en la playa by Joaquín Sorolla (1909)

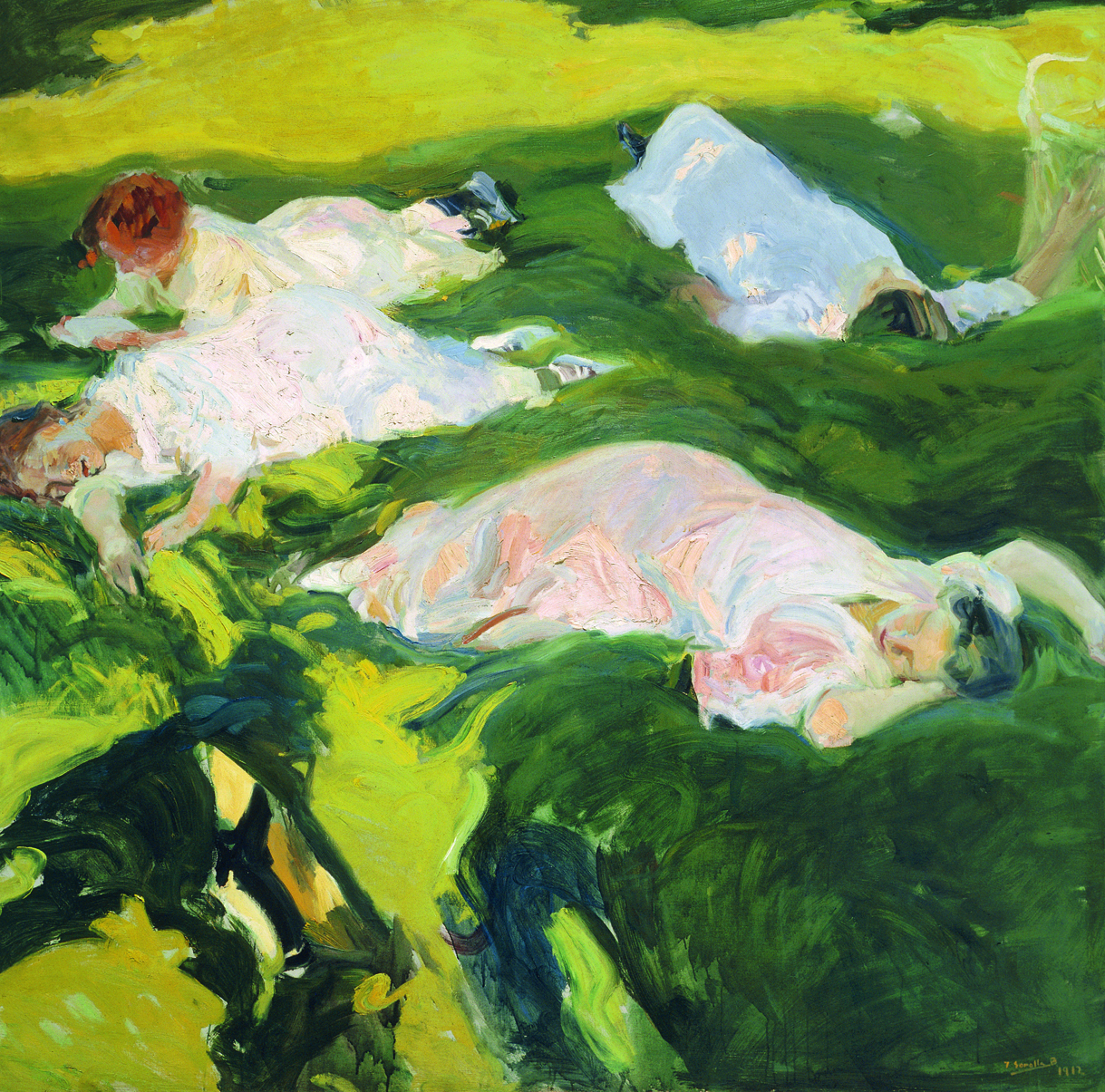
La siesta by Joaquín Sorolla (1911)

== Legacy ==
Many of Elena Sorolla's works were exhibited in her family home. Her heirs donated 13 pieces to the Sorolla Foundation and have renewed their deposit at the Sorolla Museum. In 2014, the Museums Consortium, through the Joaquín Sorolla Institution of Research and Studies, held the first monographic exhibition on her, entitled Helena Sorolla Escultora 1895–1975, at the Centre del Carmen in Valencia. In 2015 the Sorolla Museum organized an exhibition and children's workshops on her on the occasion of International Women's Day, which showed 13 of her sculptures and one portrait.

== Works ==
- Sevillana bailando (1915)
- Coqueta (c. 1915–1919)
- Desnudo de mujer (c. 1915–1921)
- Gitana (c. 1915–1922)
- Desnudo femenino (c. 1915–1926)
- Muchacha sentada (c. 1915–1929)
- Desnudo femenino recostado (1919)
- Saeta (c. 1919)
- Francisco Pons-Sorolla niño (c. 1920)
- Busto de mujer (1921)
