= Narciso Pascual Colomer =

Spanish architect (1808–1870)

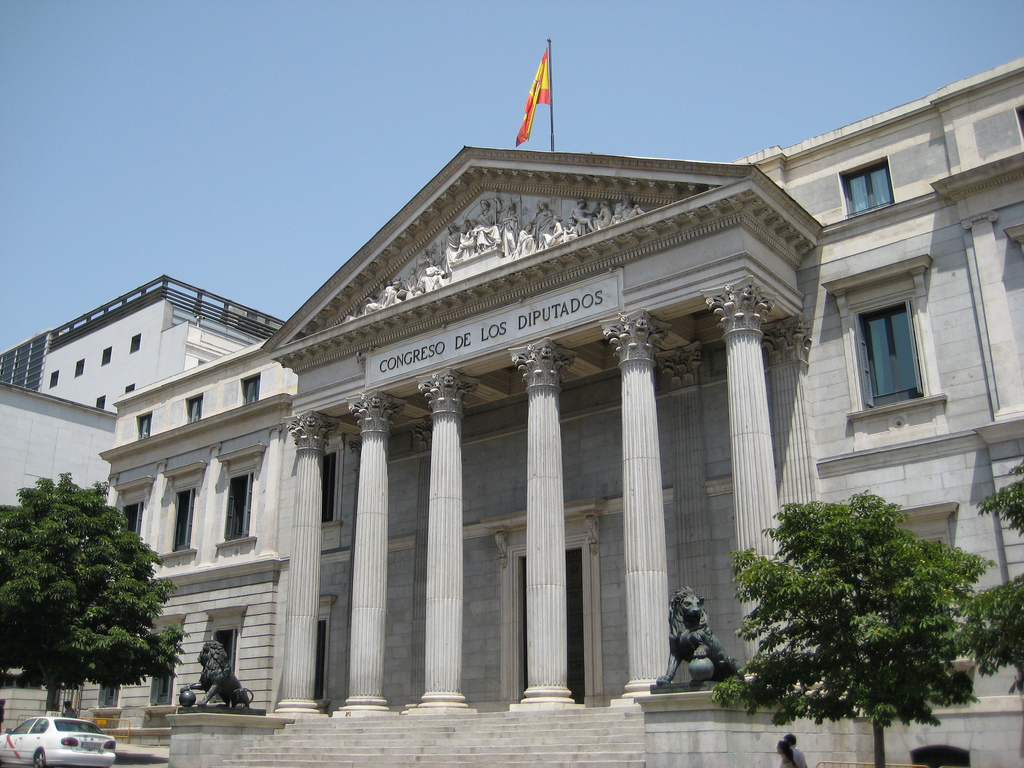
Palacio de las Cortes

Narciso Pascual Colomer, also known as Narciso Pascual y Colomer (1808 – 15 June 1870), was a Spanish architect. He was one of the most important of the reign of Isabella II, an exponent of the late Neoclassicism and historicist styles. He was a member of the Real Academia de Bellas Artes de San Fernando along with Enrique María Repullés and Ricardo Velázquez Bosco.

The majority of his works were in Madrid, such as the Palacio de las Cortes (1843–1850). This building is the seat of the Congress of Deputies.
