= Maria Rubert de Ventós =

Spanish architect, winner of the 2004

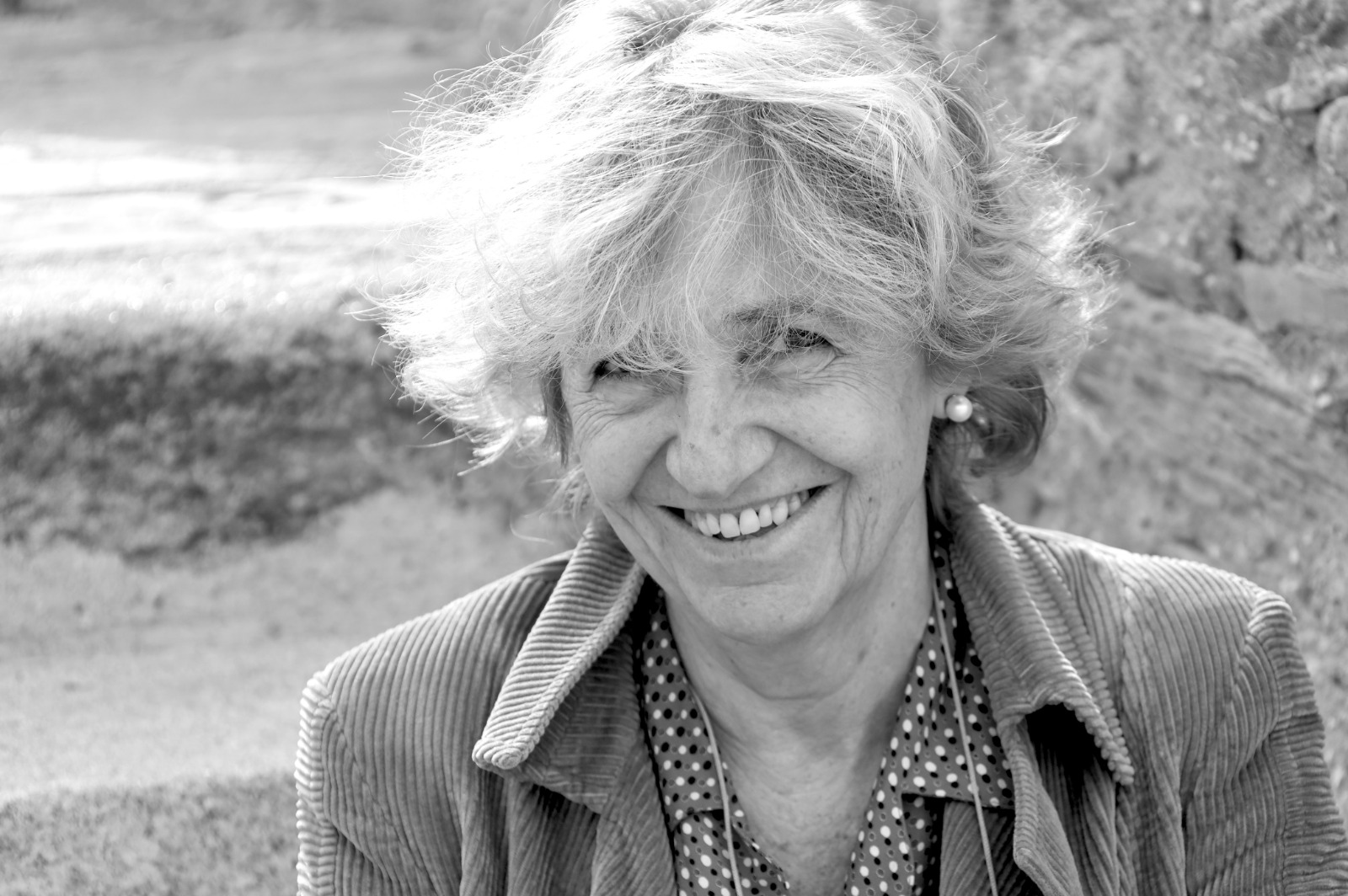
- Rubert in 2026
- Education: Escuela Técnica Superior de Arquitectura de Barcelona
- Occupation: Architect
- Notable work: Palacio de las Cortes
- Relatives: Xavier Rubert de Ventós (brother)
- Awards: National Urban Planning Award of Spain
- Website: mariarubertarquitecta.blogspot.com.es

Maria Rubert de Ventós is a Spanish architect, winner of the 2004 National Urban Planning Award. Among other works, she was co-designer of the expansion of the Palacio de las Cortes in 1994 and was project director for the Olympic Village on Barcelona's Avinguda Diagonal. In 2011, she became the first female university professor of Urban Planning in Spain.

== Education ==
Maria Rubert de Ventós received the title of architect in 1981 at the Escuela Técnica Superior de Arquitectura de Barcelona (ETSAB), where she earned her doctorate in 1991.

== Urban planning career ==
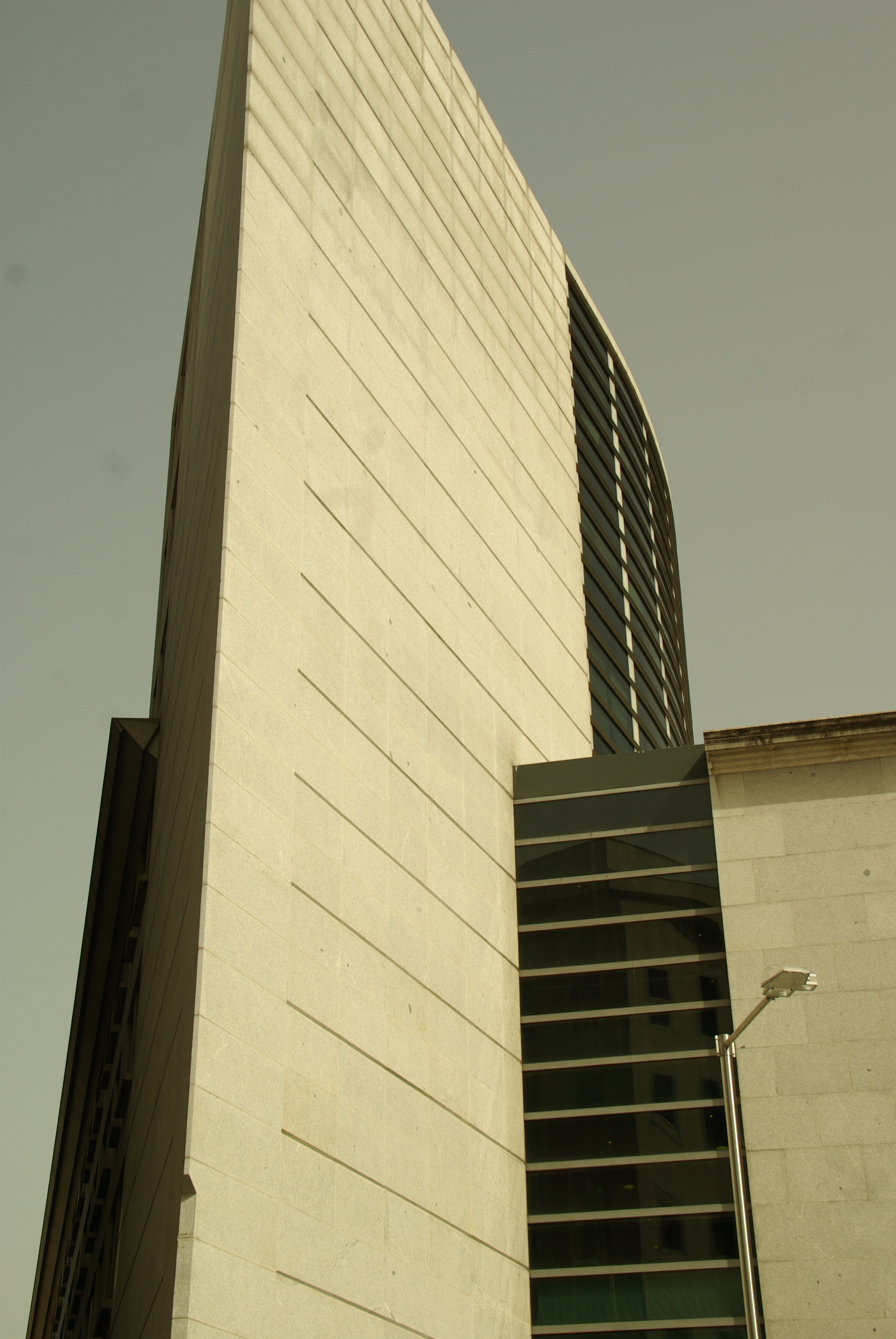
Expansion of the Palacio de las Cortes, Madrid

Rubert has focused on heritage, public and green spaces, mobility, and transport, especially in the cities of Barcelona, Madrid, and Cartagena, where she has designed management and layout plans. Her projects include the 1994 expansion of the Palacio de las Cortes of Madrid (meeting place of the Congress of Deputies), together with Josep Parcerisa and Joan Clos, after winning a competition where 287 proposals were presented.

She was also the project director for the Olympic Village on Barcelona's Avinguda Diagonal, the layout of the Besòs-Mar area, the 22@ Perú-Pere IV plan, the expansion project of Cartagena, and the urban center of Pineda de Mar.

She received the 2004 National Urbanism Award of Spain in the Journalistic Initiative category from the Ministry of Housing for her contributions to public knowledge and debate on subjects pertaining to the city of Barcelona.

== Academic career ==
Maria Rubert de Ventós was appointed full professor of the ETSAB Department of Urban and Territorial Planning in 2011, becoming the country's first woman to reach that rank in the subject.

She has been a professor of urban planning at ETSAB since 1983. She performs research and teaches in the doctoral program in urban planning and in the master's degree in landscaping at the Department of Urban Planning of the Polytechnic University of Catalonia (UPC).

She has also taught at universities in the United States, Chile, Germany, and Italy.

She has been a juror for several awards, including "Racons Públics" in Alicante in 2012. In 2017, she was a juror of the 1st Manuel de Solà-Morales European Award for urban planning granted by the UPC's Barcelona Urban Planning Laboratory.

== Publications ==
- Materials d'urbanisme (1999), Edicions ETSAB, ISBN 9788476537183, with Josep Parcerisa
- La ciudad no es una hoja en Blanco: hechos del urbanismo (2000), Ediciones ARQ, ISBN 9788469702284, with Josep Parcerisa
- Metro, Galaxias metropolitanas (2001), Edicions UPC, ISBN 9788483016558, with Josep Parcerisa
- Places Porxades a Catalunya (2006), Edicions UPC, ISBN 9788483018521
- Empire Corner (2008), Edicions ETSAB, ISBN 9788460808459
- Pere IV: scan Poblenou Barcelona: urbanística 2 2016, la ciutat per parts (2016), Barcelona Grup de Recerca Laboratori d'Urbanisme, ISBN 9788461756094, with Eulàlia Gómez
- Cities 2: Mediterranean (2018), Barcelona Grup de Recerca Laboratori d'Urbanisme, ISBN 9788409075898, with Eulàlia Gómez
- Meridiana: scan Barcelona: Urbanística 2 2017, la ciutat per parts (2018), Barcelona Grup de Recerca Laboratori d'Urbanisme, ISBN 9788409076888, with Eulàlia Gómez
