= Walk on the Beach =

1909 painting by Joaquín Sorolla

- Paseo a la orilla del mar / Paseo a orillas del mar (Spanish)
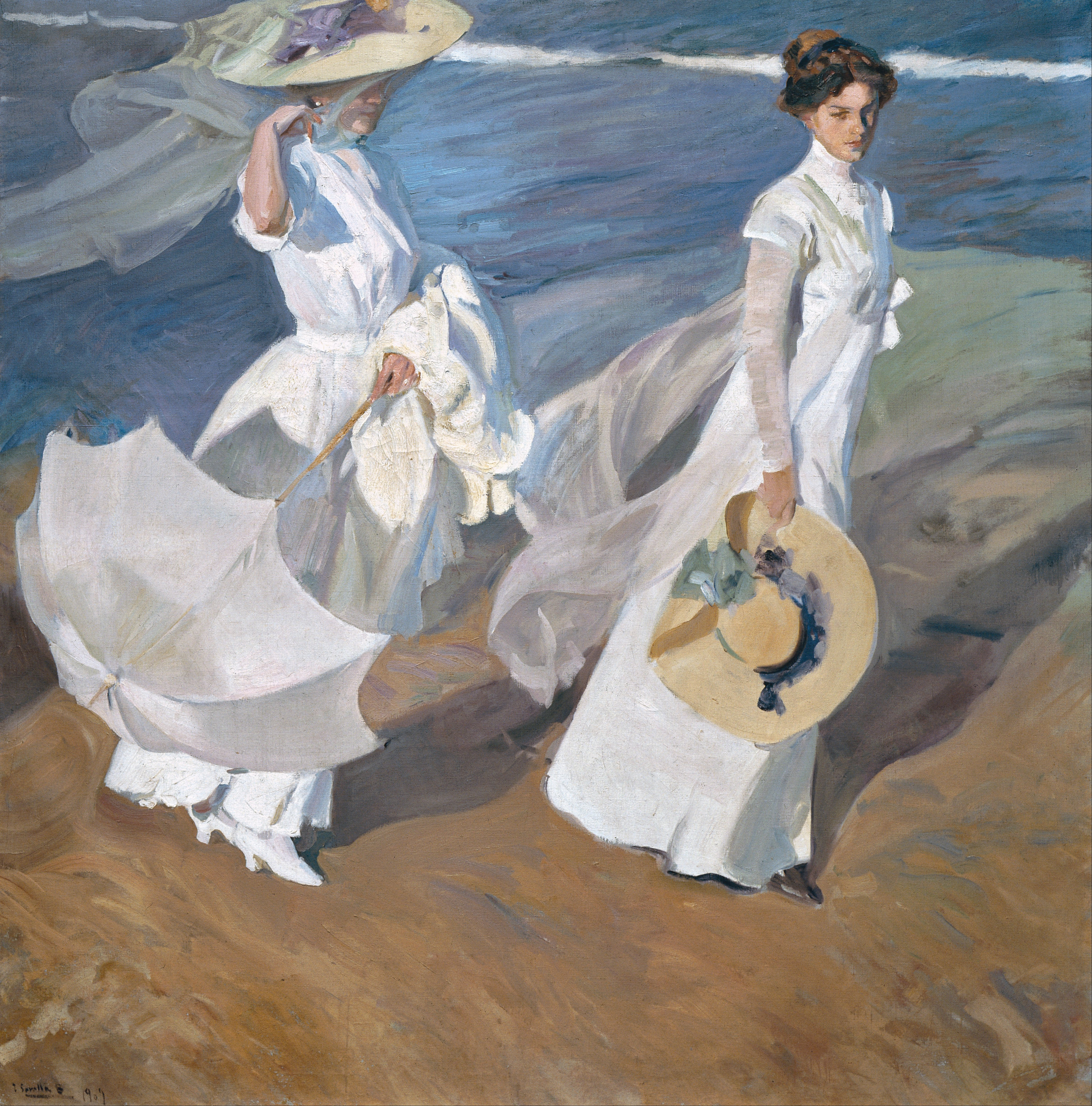
- Artist: Joaquín Sorolla
- Year: 1909
- Medium: oil on canvas
- Dimensions: 205 cm × 200 cm (81 in × 79 in)
- Location: Sorolla Museum, Madrid

Walk on the beach (Spanish: Paseo a la orilla del mar or Paseo a orillas del mar) is a 1909 oil-on-canvas painting by the Spanish painter Joaquín Sorolla.

== Description ==
It has a height of 205 cm and a width of 200 cm. and shows the wife and eldest daughter of the painter during a walk on the beach in Valencia. The painting is part of the collection of the Museo Sorolla in Madrid.

== Analysis ==
The large canvas is almost square in format and unusually monumental for a beach view. The life-size women depicted are Sorolla's wife Clotilde and his eldest daughter Maria. Sorolla painted the scenery at the Playa de El Cabanyal beach in his hometown of Valencia. Both women lean forward slightly so that they appear to move toward the right edge. While the wife stands straight, aligned to the edge, the daughter Maria has slightly turned her head to her right shoulder and is looking towards the viewer.

Mother and daughter both wear long white sundresses. The elegant presentation, which also includes a straw hat for each and a parasol for the mother, is typical of the fashion of the time, around 1910. The 19-year-old Maria has a simple floor-length dress that emphasizes her slender silhouette. At the neck the dress is finished with a stand-up collar. The tight-fitting sleeves contrast with the rest of the dress, and are of a more transparent white cloth, through which shines the skin. Of similar fabric is an panel of cloth mounted below the chest on a large ring. The sea wind blows the cloth into arabesques behind the daughter. Under the dress appears a brown leather shoe; on its side reflections emphasize the smooth surface. In her right hand Maria holds a yellow straw hat with a wide, sweeping brim, decorated with purple colored flowers and a turquoise bow. She has pinned her brown hair into a knot, so that her face comes into its own.

The figure behind the daughter, Clotilde Sorolla, also wears a white dress, her hips accented by a white belt. Thus both the breasts and the buttocks have clearer contours than the daughter's. Clothilde's dress has cropped sleeves, and she carries a jacket, also made of white fabric, on her left forearm in front of her abdomen. In her left hand she holds an open white parasol, which is angled to the ground on the left side. Under Clotilde's dress are two elegant white women's shoes with small heels. On her head Clotilde wears a straw hat, which is also decorated with purple colored flowers. A greenish-transparent veil is draped over the entire hat, and falls forward over her face and is blown backward almost horizontally in the wind. Clotilde has bent her right arm upward and her hand lies on the veil. This creates the impression that she must hold it in place against the wind. Clotilde's face, depicted in profile, is in shadow except for the chin, and her wide, sweeping hat obscures her hair almost completely. Just behind a pearl earring is a bit of dark hair. While the young face of the daughter Maria is looks directly into the sun, the face of the mother is hidden by the shadow of the hat. The clothes and accessories show the two women to be members of the upper class spending their free time in the summer with mild temperatures and light winds.

Mother and daughter stand a few meters from the sea on an ocher expanse of sand in the foreground at the bottom. Unlike the people depicted, the sand surface is depicted in short strokes. Behind the two women is a seamless transition from the beach to the sea. The perspective of the viewer is slightly raised so that no horizon is visible. Instead, the beach and the sea form a curtain-like background and a curl of white foam rides a wave at the top of the screen, replacing the horizon. The sea shimmers in different shades of blue, which Sorolla applied in elongated brushstrokes. Before chest of Clotilde the sea has a pale blue color, and behind the backs of the women are rather darker shades of blue. In the area to the right of the daughter, the turquoise surface of the water is difficult to distinguish from the shore. The dominant color of the image is the white of the dress and the parasol. Sorolla has mixed this white, like the French impressionists, with many other colors. So blue, yellow, lilac or orange shades are in the white form the light and shadow effects. In their bright whites, the figures clearly stand out from the rest of the image. The light is characteristic of the early evening of a summer day in the Mediterranean. The already low sun appears from the direction of the viewer on the two sides to seeing women whose long shadows loom on the beach behind them. Playback of these lighting effects under the southern sun are typical Valenciano for Luminismo, one in Spain resulting from the Impressionism as a special form of Neo-Impressionism, whose main representative was Joaquín Sorolla.

== Background to the creation of the painting ==
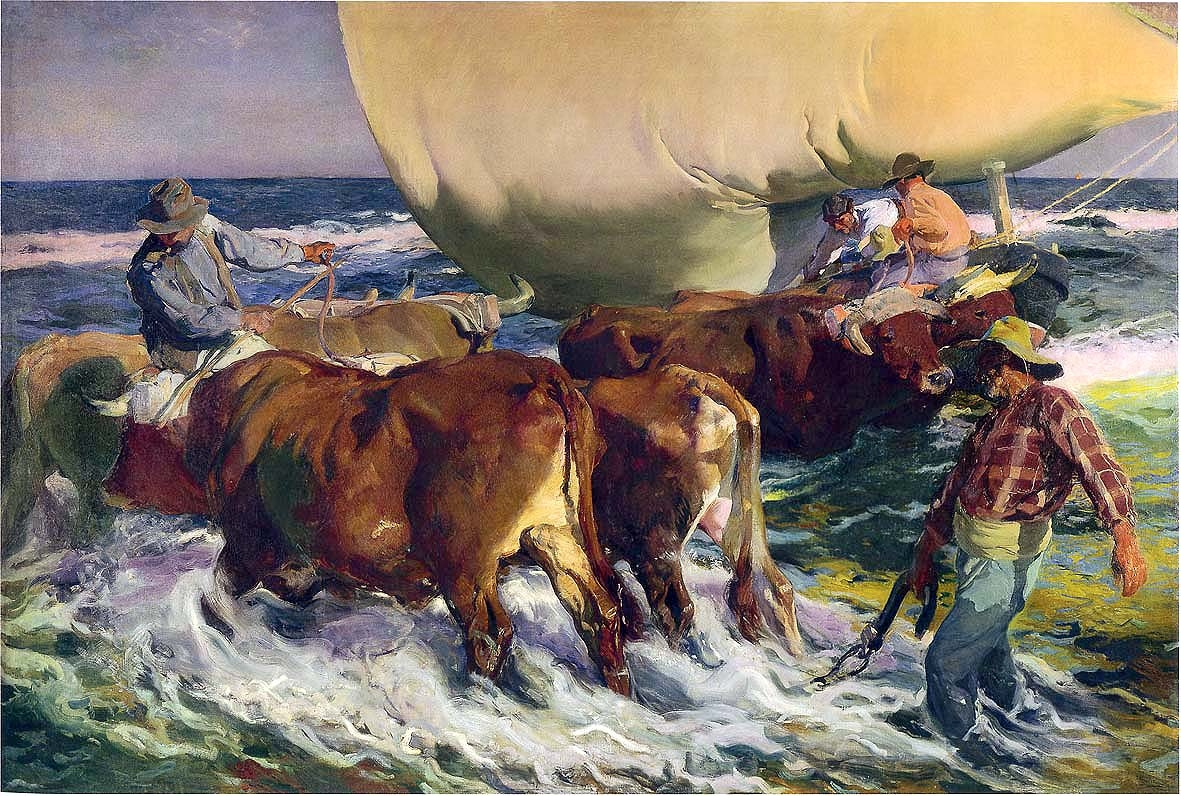
Joaquín Sorolla: Abendsonne, 1903

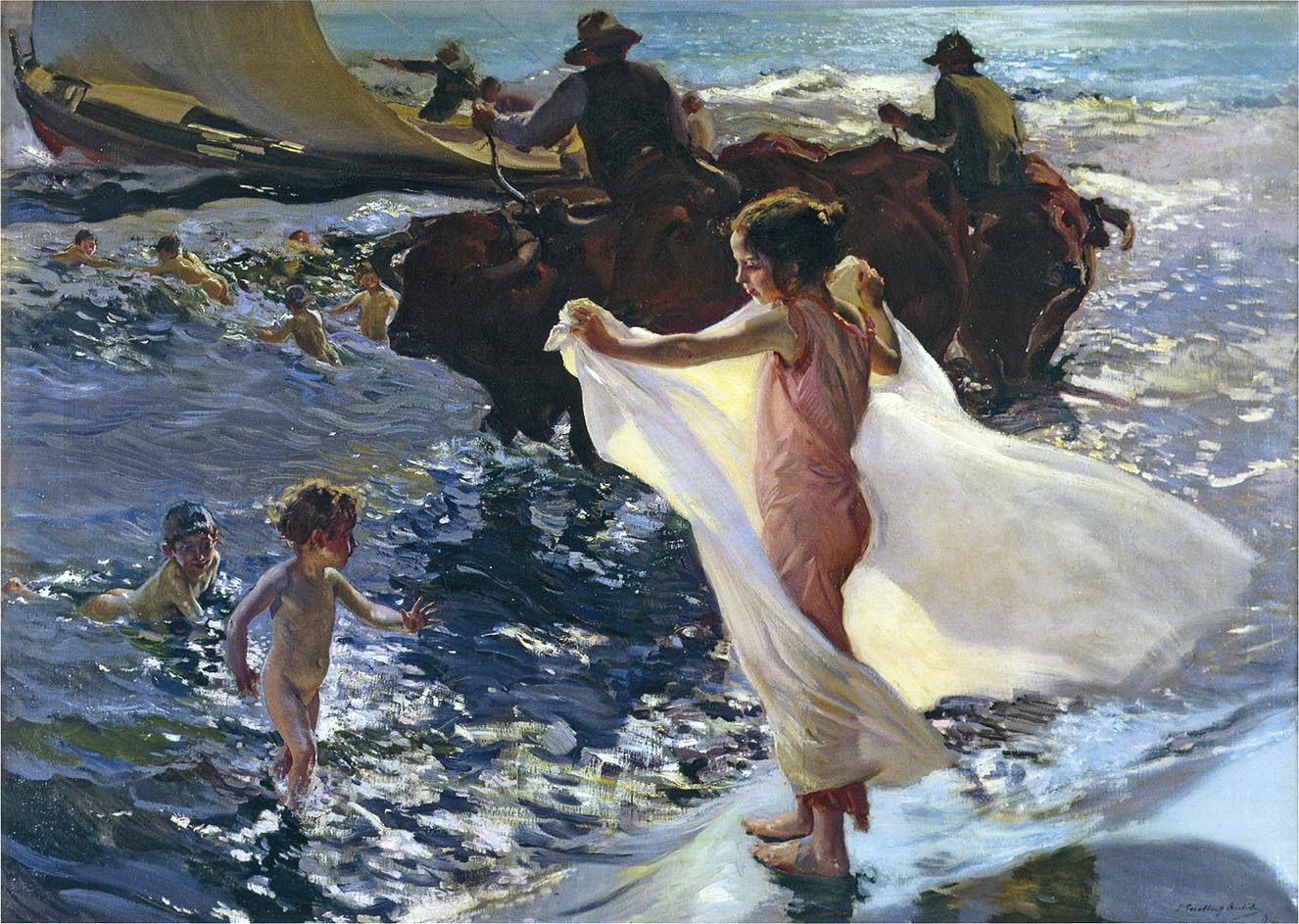
La hora del baño, 1904

1909 was extremely successful for Sorolla. He had already been widely recognized for his paintings and received awards not only in Spain but also in France and Germany, but the year 1909 was a high point in his career. At the invitation of the American art collector Archer M. Huntington, he traveled with his wife and the two older children Maria and Joaquín at the beginning of the year to New York City. Here Huntington had previously opened the Hispanic Society of America that year and in their rooms, should Sorolla showed the first exhibition of his work in the United States. It was Sorolla's first trip across the Atlantic and later adjusting success unpredictable. On February 4, 1909, the opening of the exhibition took place; initially only a few visitors came. This changed gradually as very positive reviews appeared in the newspapers. When it closed on March 8 the exhibition had had a total of 169,000 visitors to see Sorolla's work. Encouraged by the overwhelming response, a slightly modified collection was also shown in Buffalo and Boston. During his stay in the United States Sorolla received 20 portrait commissions, including that of the just-elected US President William Howard Taft, whom he visited in the White House in Washington, D.C. In May 1909, as Sorolla left the United States, he had sold a total of 195 images - including two works to the Metropolitan Museum of Art - and taken in the enormous sum of 181,760 US dollars.

Back in Europe, Sorolla held initially in Paris and exhibited in art exhibition of the Société des Artistes Français, the 1903 painting Evening Sun, an image of fishermen from Valencia. About Madrid he traveled to Valencia, where he saw his daughter Elena and the rest of the family. He attended the local art exhibition Exposicion Regional and received a second award for the work exhibited there. Inspired by the success of his trip to America and the good reviews he received at the exhibitions in Paris and Valencia, he began a prolific summer. He planned in 1911 to travel again on exhibition tour in the United States and needed new paintings. He stayed until the end of September in Valencia and created in these summer months "some of his best and most spectacular beach scenes," as his biographer and granddaughter Blanca Pons-Sorolla notes. The resulting paintings of this summer beach walk provide a climax in Sorolla's career according to José Luis Alcaide.

== Sorolla's beach paintings ==
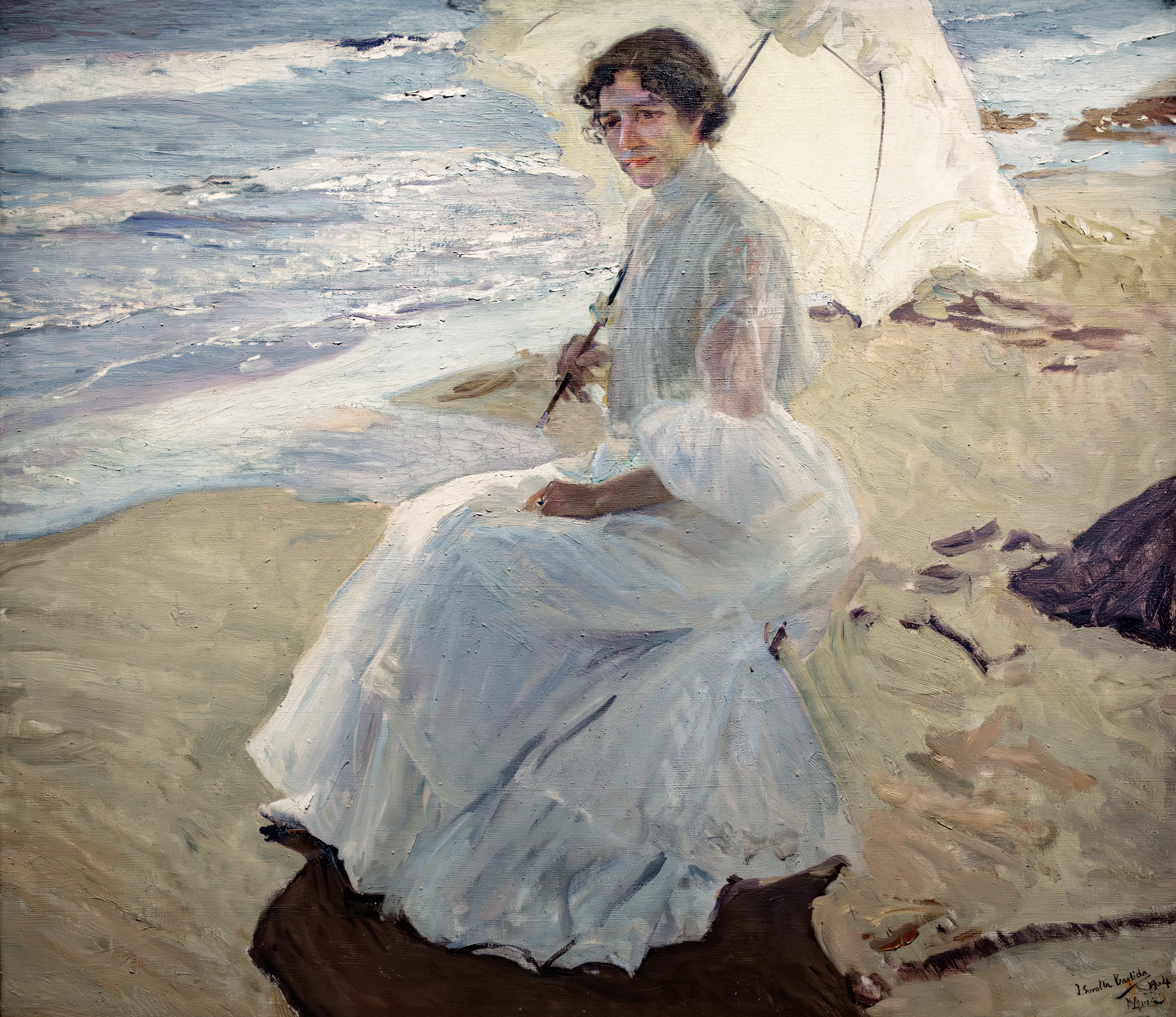
Clotilde en la playa, 1904

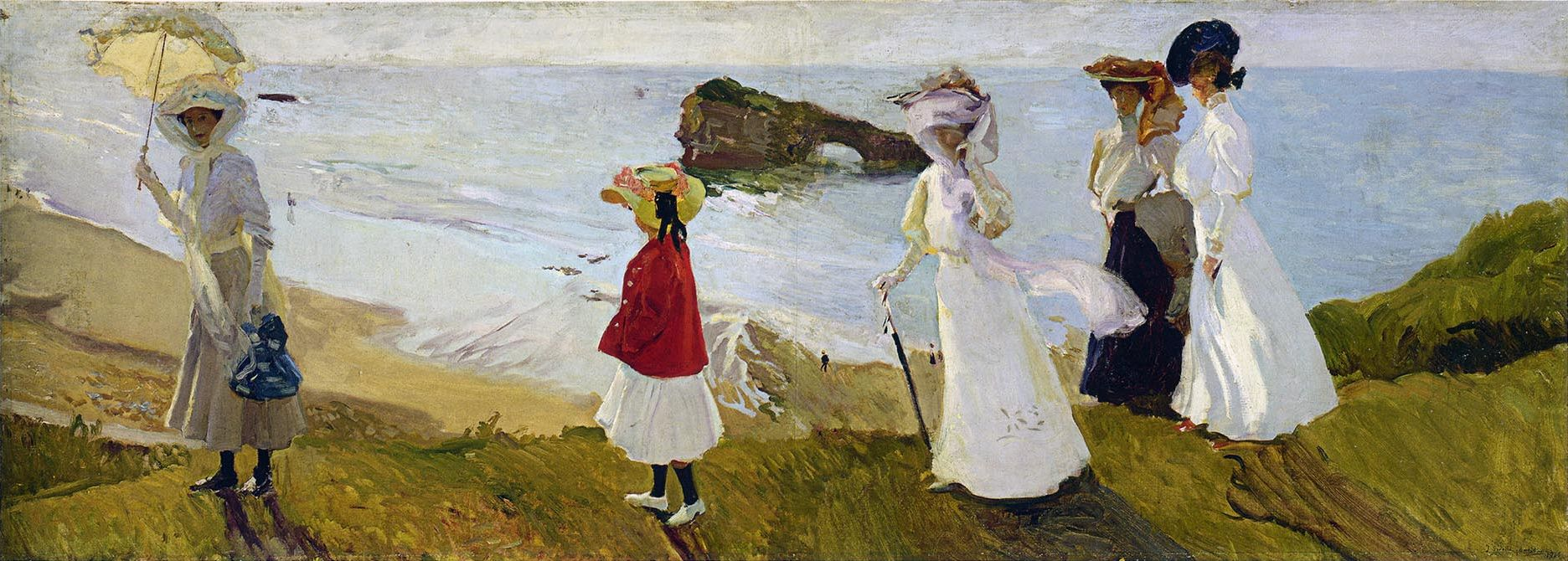
Paseo del faro, 1906

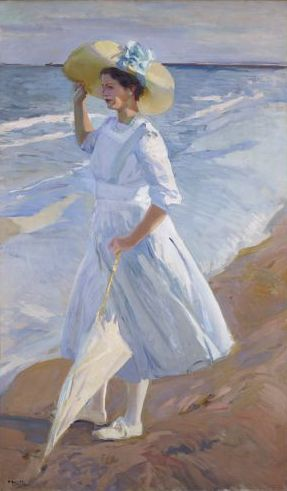
Elena en la playa, 1909

Born in Valencia, Joaquín Sorolla had been familiar since his youth with life on the sea. In his early work, there is the traditional port view Marina, Barcos en el Puerto with which he made his debut in the art exhibition Expsoición National in Madrid in 1881. In the 1890s he repeatedly returned to the subject of fishermen from Valencia. In some very large paintings, he showed fishermen bringing their catch ashore or pulling their boat onto the beach with oxen. He also portrayed boatbuilders or fishwives, not a glamorous life of leisure activities, but working people at sea. For this work, he received very positive reviews and was awarded prizes. In addition, these works brought international success. The French government bought the painting La Vuelta de la presence from 1895 and the Berlin National Gallery acquired Pescadores Valencianos of 1895.

In 1900 Sorolla began to paint children bathing. In the 1904 painting La hora del baño Sorolla linked fishing and bathing children and portrayed naked children swimming between a fishing boat and an ox standing in the water. In the foreground one of the children comes from the sea and is awaited by a young woman who stretches out a white cloth to dry the wet child. Already this picture anticipates Sorolla's themes in Walk on the Beach. So the white fabric plays a central role: The movement of the cloth in the wind is already the main subject, the shore area between the water and beach has no clear contours and the whole picture is bathed in the light of early evening.

That same summer Sorolla portrayed his wife Clotilde at Valencia. In Clotilde en la playa the wife sits on a stool near the sea in a white dress. Here as in the later Walk on the Beach, the parasol is already an important prop. The open parasol casts shadows on her face, which is hidden by a veil in the later image. In this picture the painter has taken a slightly elevated position, so that no background horizon line is visible. Instead of the beach in the foreground it goes directly into the waves of the sea, with no sky to be seen.

In 1906, Sorolla and his family visited Biarritz in northern Spain (Note: Biarritz is in France). In the group portrait Paseo de Faro several women walk along the cliffs above the beach. The painter shows here the beach and washed around by underwater rock formation as a background motive. In front of the frieze-like image the women are loosely arranged side by side. Again, white clothing dominates the scene, and only the young girl in the center stands out in a bright red jacket. Large hats and parasols are important props in this image also.

In 1909 he returned to the beach in Valencia and again took up themes depicting people at sea. In the portrait Elena en la playa Sorolla portrayed his youngest daughter in a white dress with the beach as a background. In this portrait, from about the same time as Walk on the Beach, Sorolla painted the meeting of land and sea, the waves of the sea, the dress moving in the wind, a hat and the light of a summer day in the Mediterranean.

== Provenance ==
The painting remained in the artist's possession until he died. In his will he bequeathed the picture to his son Joaquín Sorolla García. who was the first director of the museum in the former home of his parents, Sorolla Museum. In 1931 Sorolla's wife Clotilde bequeathed the house together with the inventory to the Spanish government, set up with the support for a Joaquín Sorolla museum. The son Joaquín Sorolla García, followed the generous example of his mother and after his death in 1948 bequeathed to the Spanish government the Walk on the Beach painting, along with other works of his father. Since that time, it has belonged to the collection of the Museo Sorolla in Madrid.

== Sources ==
- José Luis Díez, Javier Barón: Joaquín Sorolla, 1863-1923, Museo Nacional del Prado, Madrid 2009, ISBN 978-84-8480-183-2.
- Blanca Pons-Sorolla: Joaquín Sorolla, Ediciones Polígrafa, Barcelona 2009, ISBN 978-84-343-1225-8.
- Blanca Pons-Sorolla: Sorolla, die Meisterwerke. Frölich & Kaufmann, Berlin 2014, ISBN 978-3-945330-03-6.
- Begoña Torres González: Sorolla, Libsa, Madrid 2009, ISBN 978-84-662-1040-9.
