= Enrique María Repullés =

Spanish architect

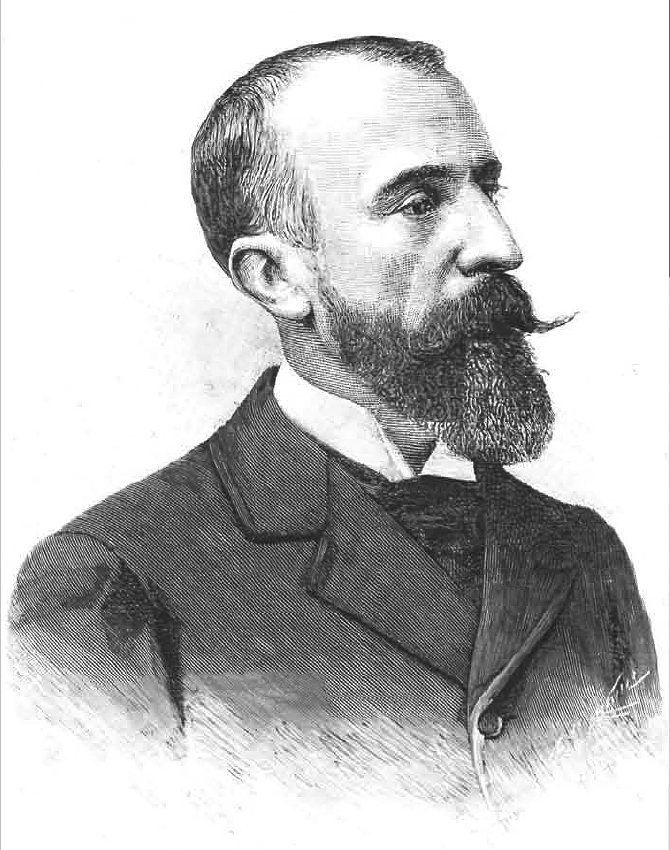
Enrique María Repullés

Enrique María Repullés (30 October 1845 in Madrid – 13 September 1922 in Madrid) was a Spanish architect.

He was a member of the Real Academia de Bellas Artes de San Fernando along with Narciso Pascual Colomer and Ricardo Velázquez Bosco.

== Work in Madrid ==
He was responsible for important buildings in Madrid, such as the neo-classical Madrid Stock Exchange and the neo-mudéjar Iglesia de Santa Cristina (near the Puerta del Ángel) (1904-6). He carried out work in the grounds of the Palacio Real at the Plaza de la Armería and the Campo del Moro.

== Work outside Madrid ==
He also designed buildings in the provinces such as the Casa Consistorial of Valladolid (1892-1908) and the Basílica de Santa Teresa in Alba de Tormes, Province of Salamanca.
