= Palace of la Bolsa de Madrid =

- Palacio de la Bolsa de Madrid (Spanish)
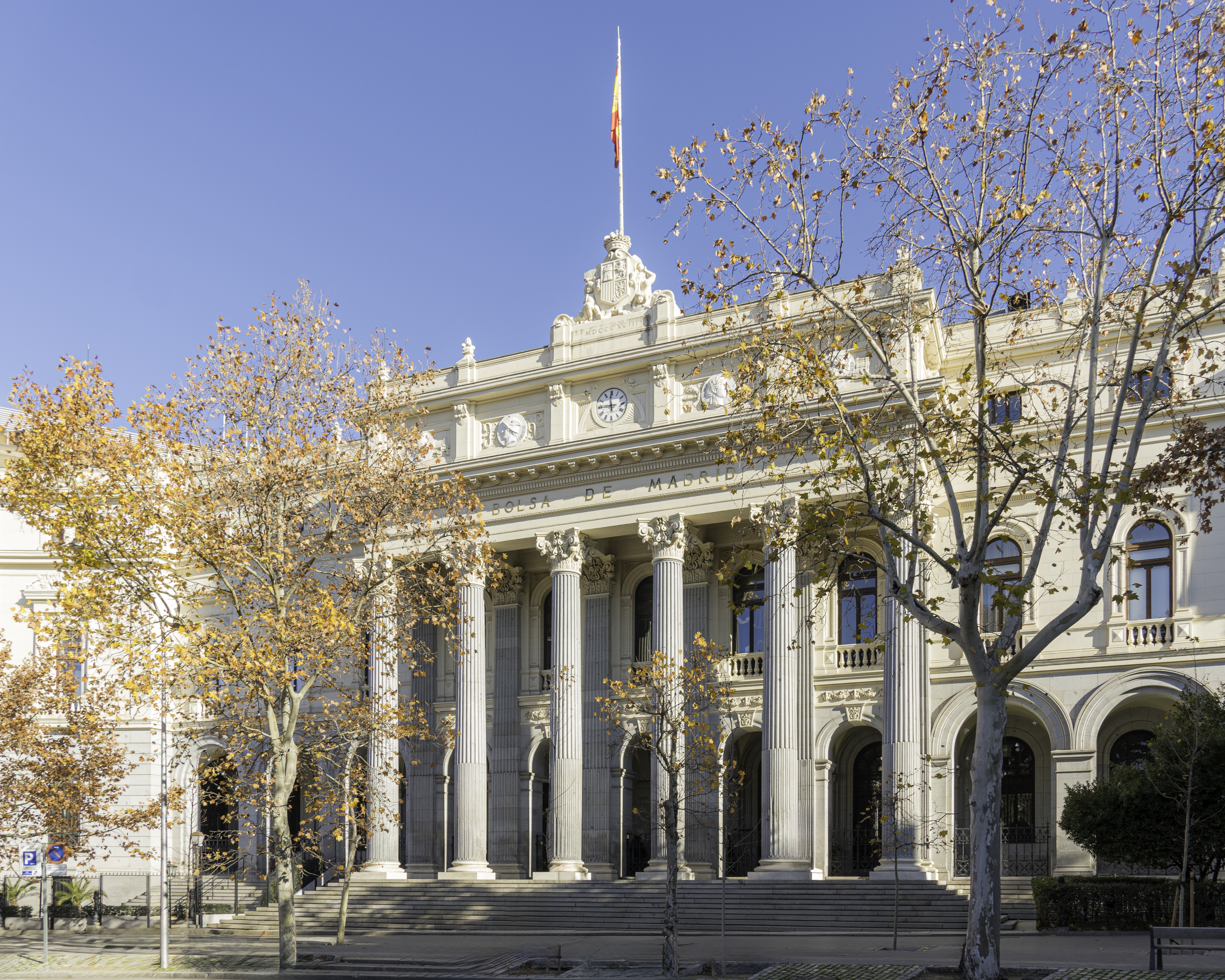

- Location within Spain
- 40.416908°N 3.692063°W
- Location: Madrid, Spain

Site notes
- Architect: Enrique María Repullés

Spanish Cultural Heritage
- Official name: Palacio de la Bolsa de Madrid
- Type: Non-movable
- Criteria: Monument
- Designated: 1992
- Reference no.: RI-51-0007091

The Palace of la Bolsa de Madrid (Spanish: Palacio de la Bolsa de Madrid) is a nineteenth-century building located in Madrid, Spain. It is neo-classical in style, featuring a portico supported by six Corinthian columns.

== History ==
The building was designed by Enrique María Repullés to house the main Spanish stock exchange, the Bolsa de Madrid, which had been in existence since 1831. It can be compared to other European stock exchange buildings of the time such as that of Vienna which also has a hexastyle portico. The building was opened by the Queen Regent of Spain, Maria Cristina, in 1893.

Electronic trading replaced floor trading in 1989. The building was given the heritage listing Bien de Interés Cultural in 1992.

== Current use ==
The interior of the Palacio de la Bolsa

The Bolsa de Madrid still occupies the building. The screens housed in the historic trading hall feature in TV news reports of economic news.
