= Sorolla Museum =

Single-artist museum in Madrid, Spain

- Museo Sorolla
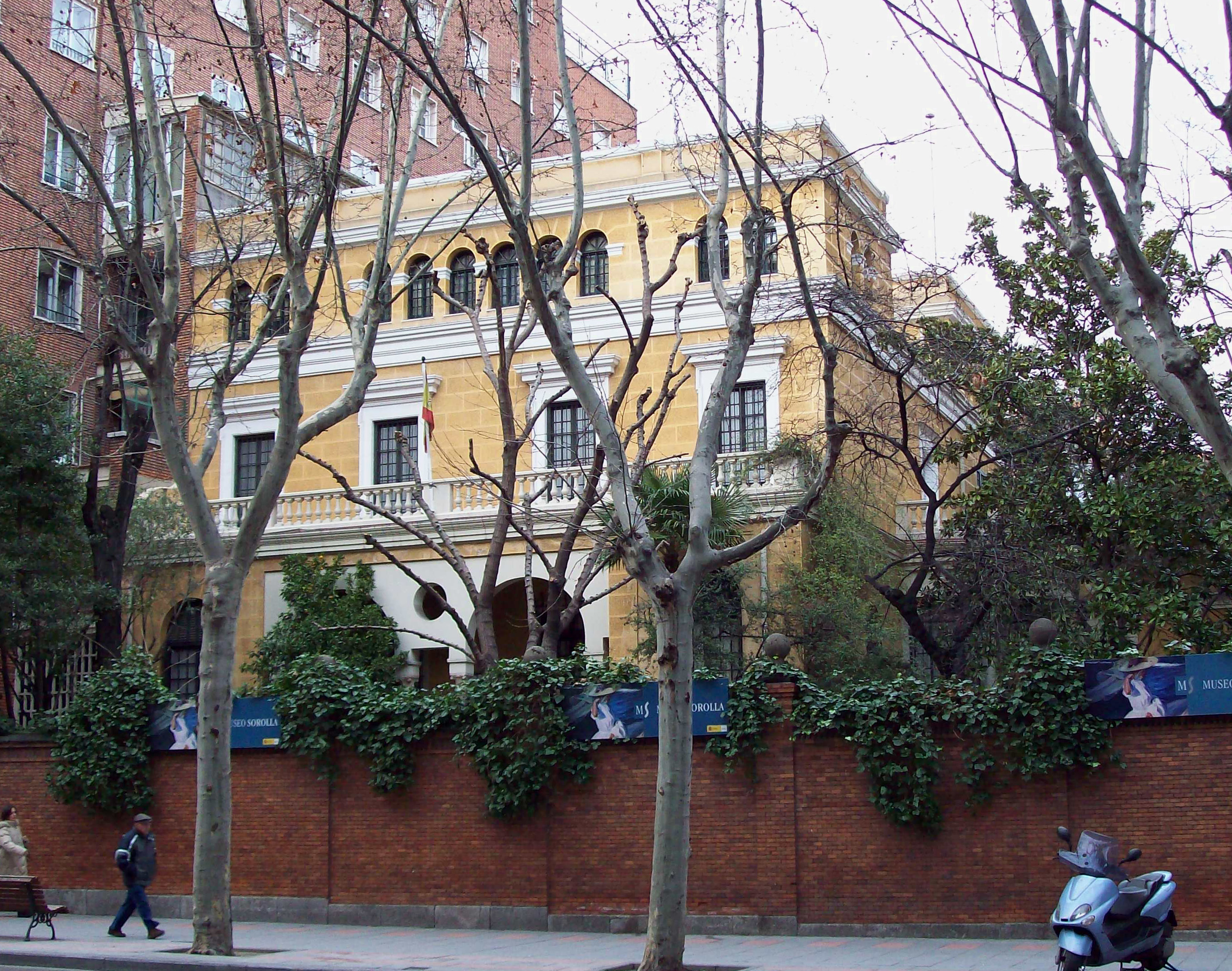
- Façade of the Museum
- Location: Madrid, Spain
- Coordinates: 40°26′06″N 3°41′35″W
- Type: Single-artist museum

Spanish Cultural Heritage
- Official name: Museo Sorolla
- Type: Non-movable
- Criteria: Monument
- Designated: 1962
- Reference no.: RI-51-0001383

The Sorolla Museum (Spanish: Museo Sorolla) is a single-artist museum in Madrid, Spain, devoted to the work and life of Joaquín Sorolla and the members of his family, such as his wife Clotilde and daughter Elena. The museum is located in the house that was the artist's home and workshop.

At the beginning of the 20th century Sorolla was in a strong financial position and he commissioned a new home from Enrique María Repullés who had designed Madrid's Stock Exchange. It includes a large working area on the ground floor.

== History of the museum ==
Sorolla died intestate, but his widow made a will providing for the conversion of the house into a museum after her death which occurred in 1929. The museum opened in 1932.

The building was declared Bien de Interés Cultural in 1962. It is one of the National Museums of Spain and it is attached to the Ministry of Culture. The principal rooms continue to be furnished as they were during the artist's life, including Sorolla's large, well-lit studio, where the walls are filled with his canvasses. Other rooms are used as galleries to display Sorolla's paintings, while the upstairs rooms are a gallery for temporary exhibitions. In 2014, these rooms presented an exhibition of David Palacin photographs of the ballet Sorolla produced by the Spanish National Dance Company.

== Expansion of the museum ==
Adjacent properties on calle Zurbano have been acquired to allow the expansion of the museum. The project has been planned by the architectural partnership Nieto Sobejano, which has aimed to evoke aspects of the existing house in the designs for the extension.

The museum closed in 2024 to allow works to proceed. Part of the collection was put on show at the Royal Collections Gallery in an exhibition called "Sorolla, a hundred years of modernity" which marked the centenary of the artist's death. The Sorolla Museum extension was opened in October 2026.

== Selected collection highlights ==
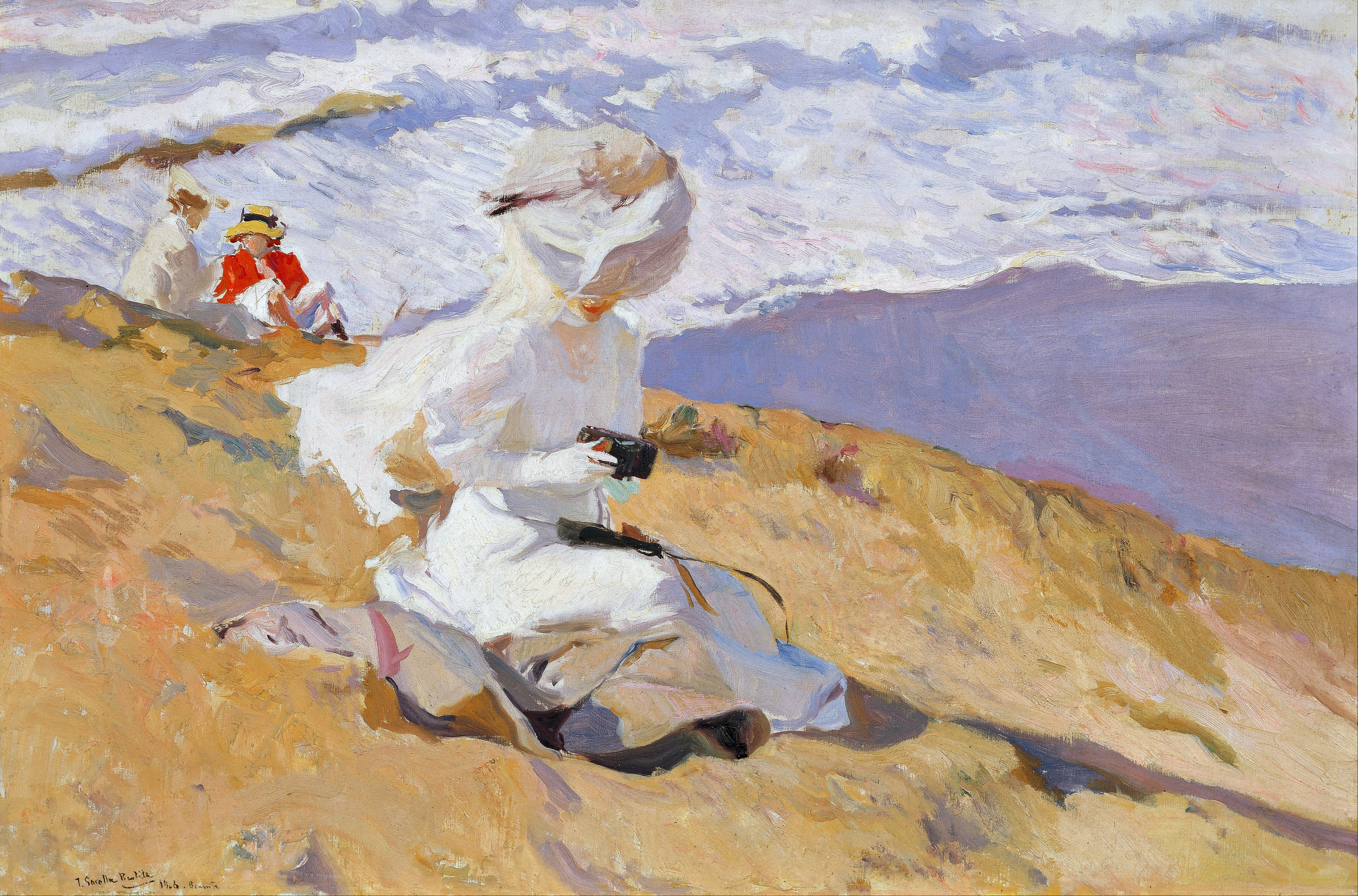
Capturing the moment

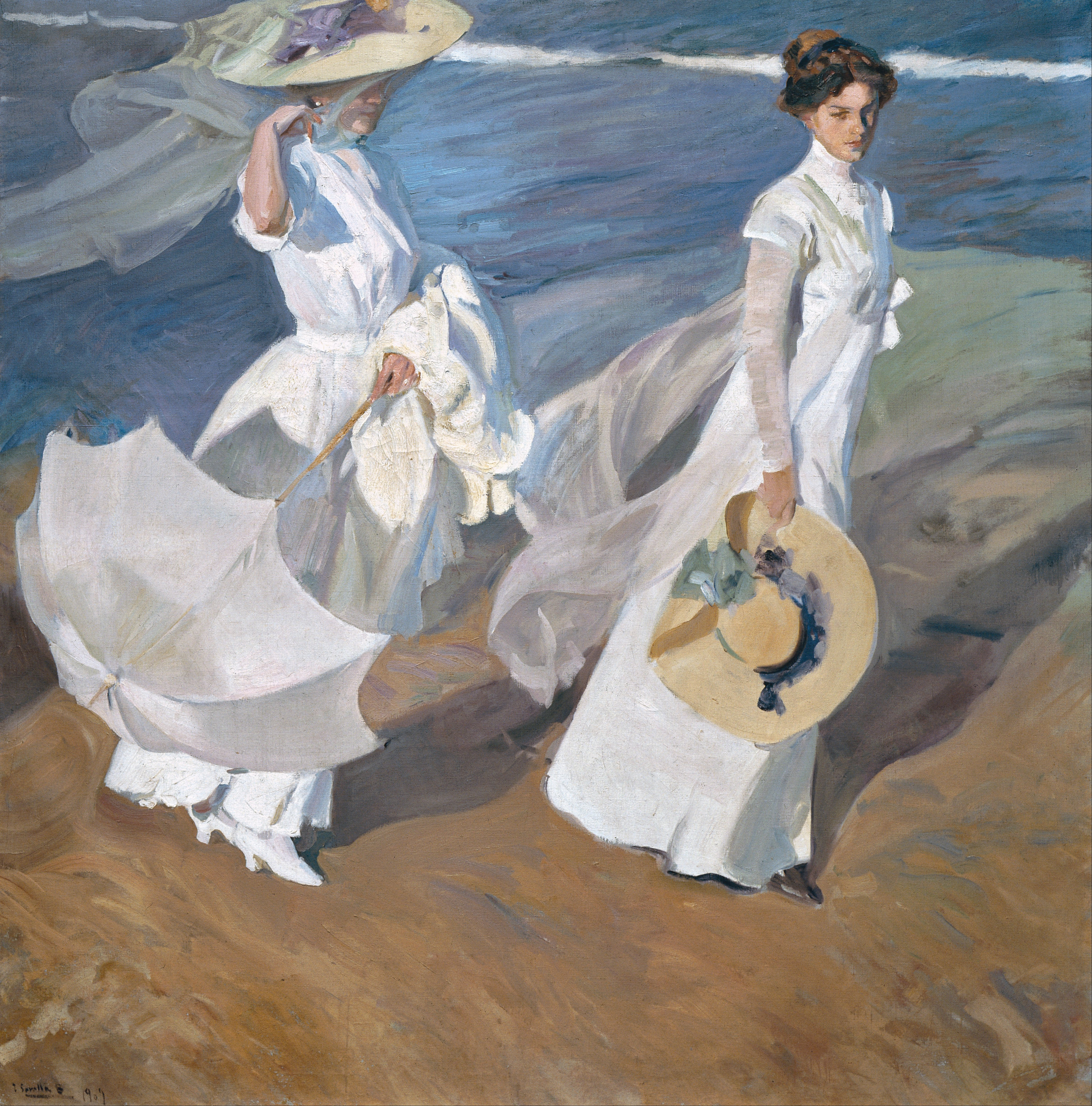
Strolling along the Seashore

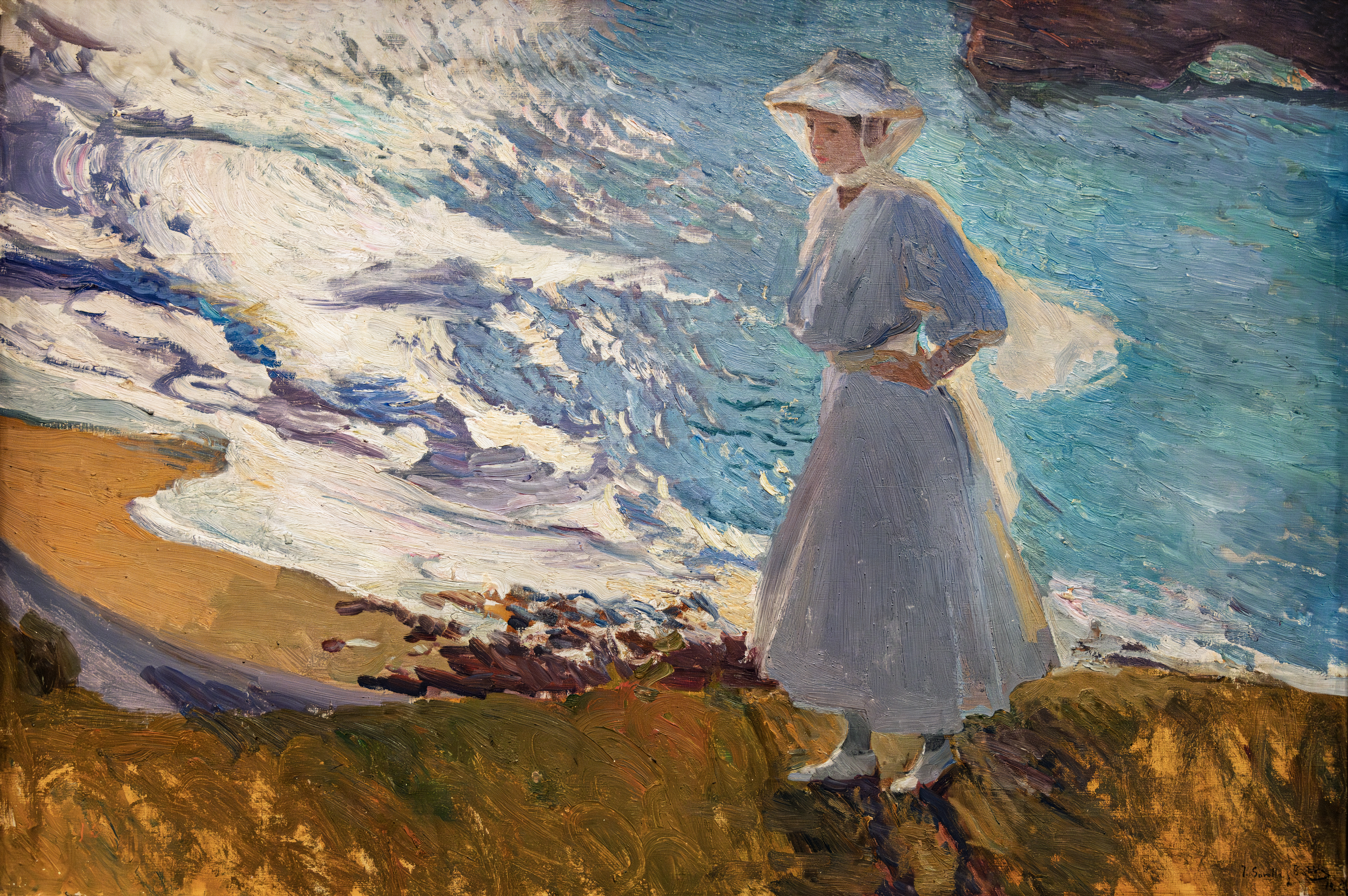
Backlit, Maria in Biarritz 1906

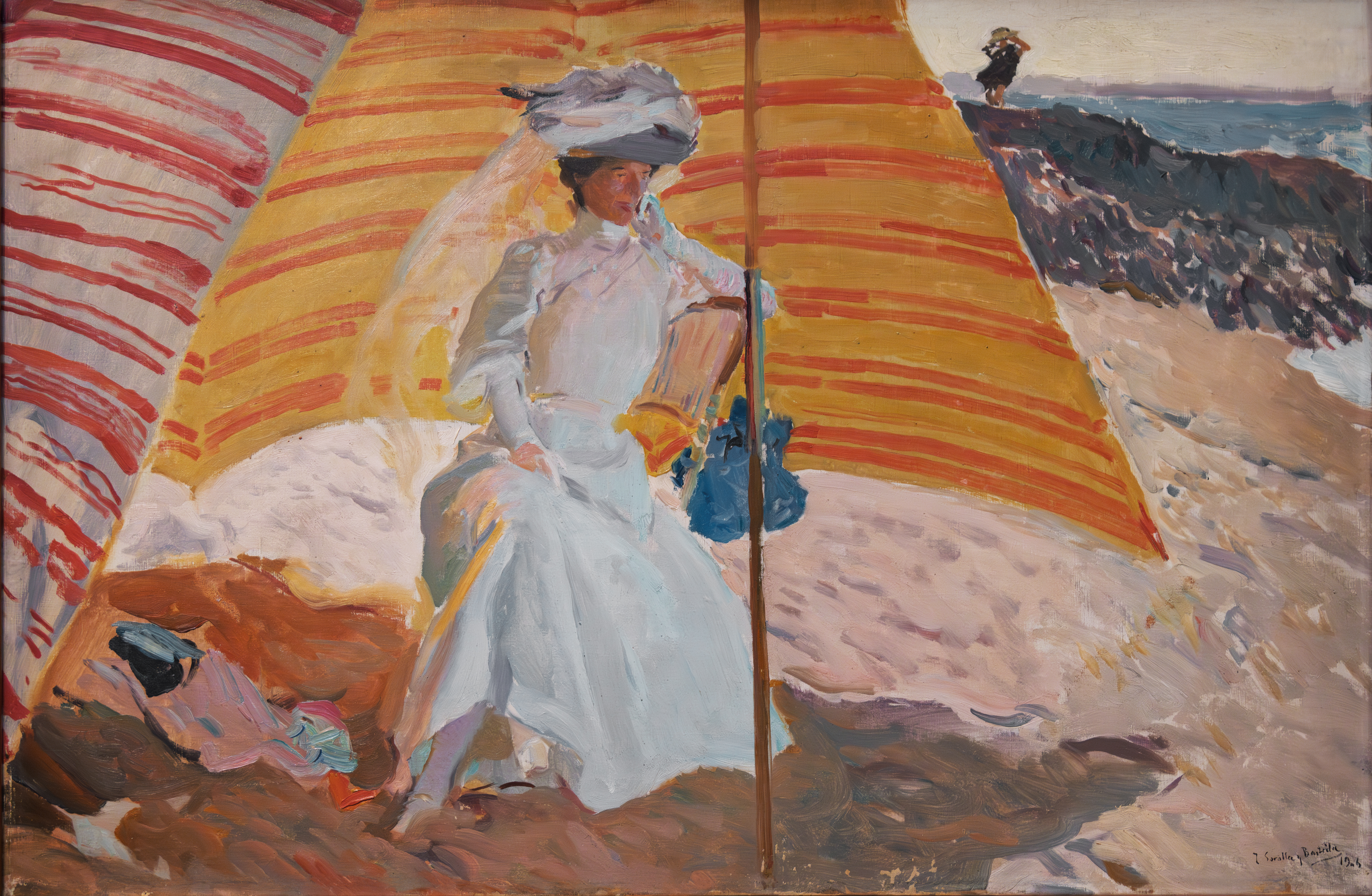
Clotilde under the awning 1906

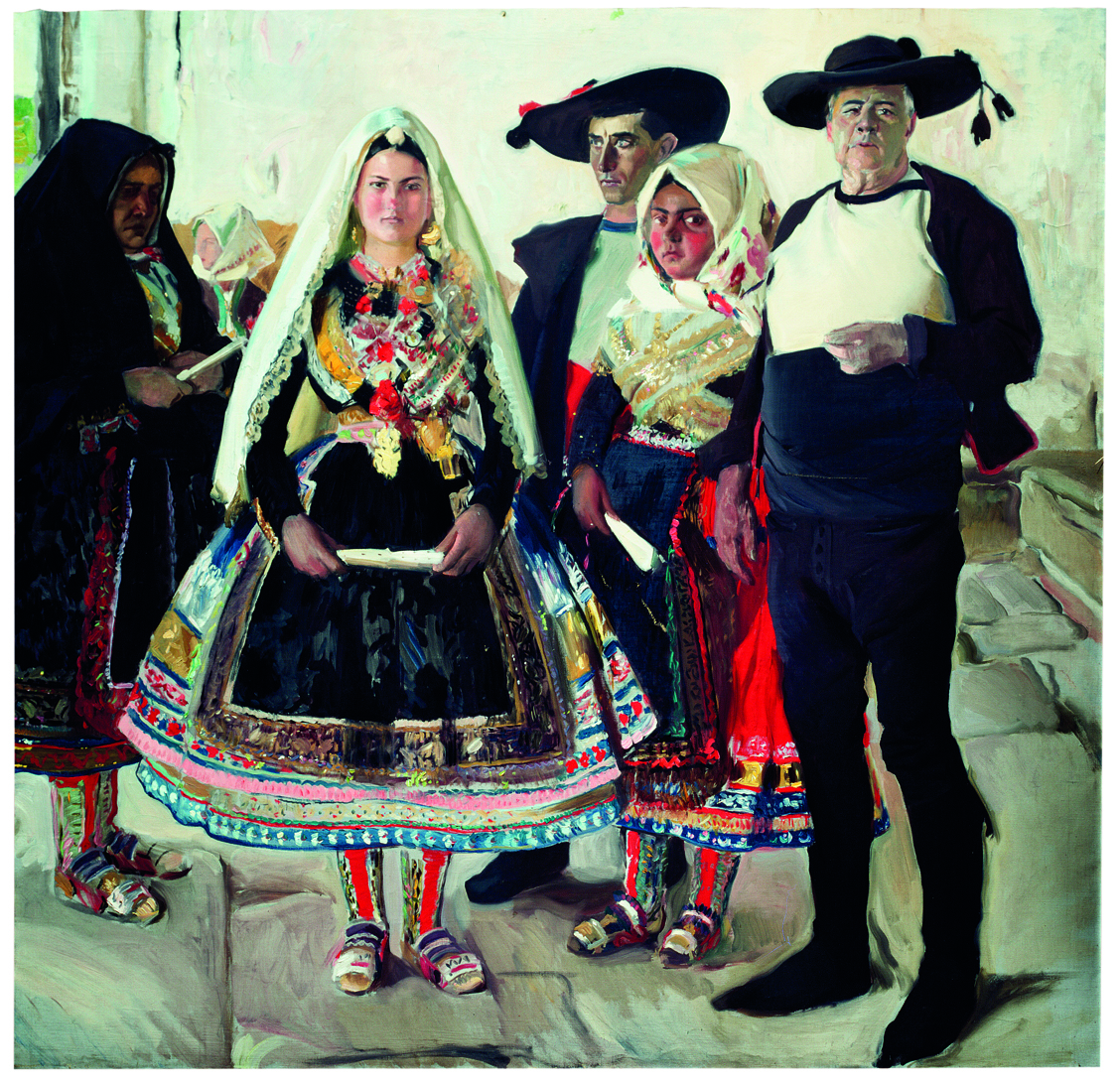
Types and Bride of Lagartera

== See also ==
- List of single-artist museums
