= Pavilion of Spain (1900) =

Royal Pavilion of Spain
- Pabellón Real de España
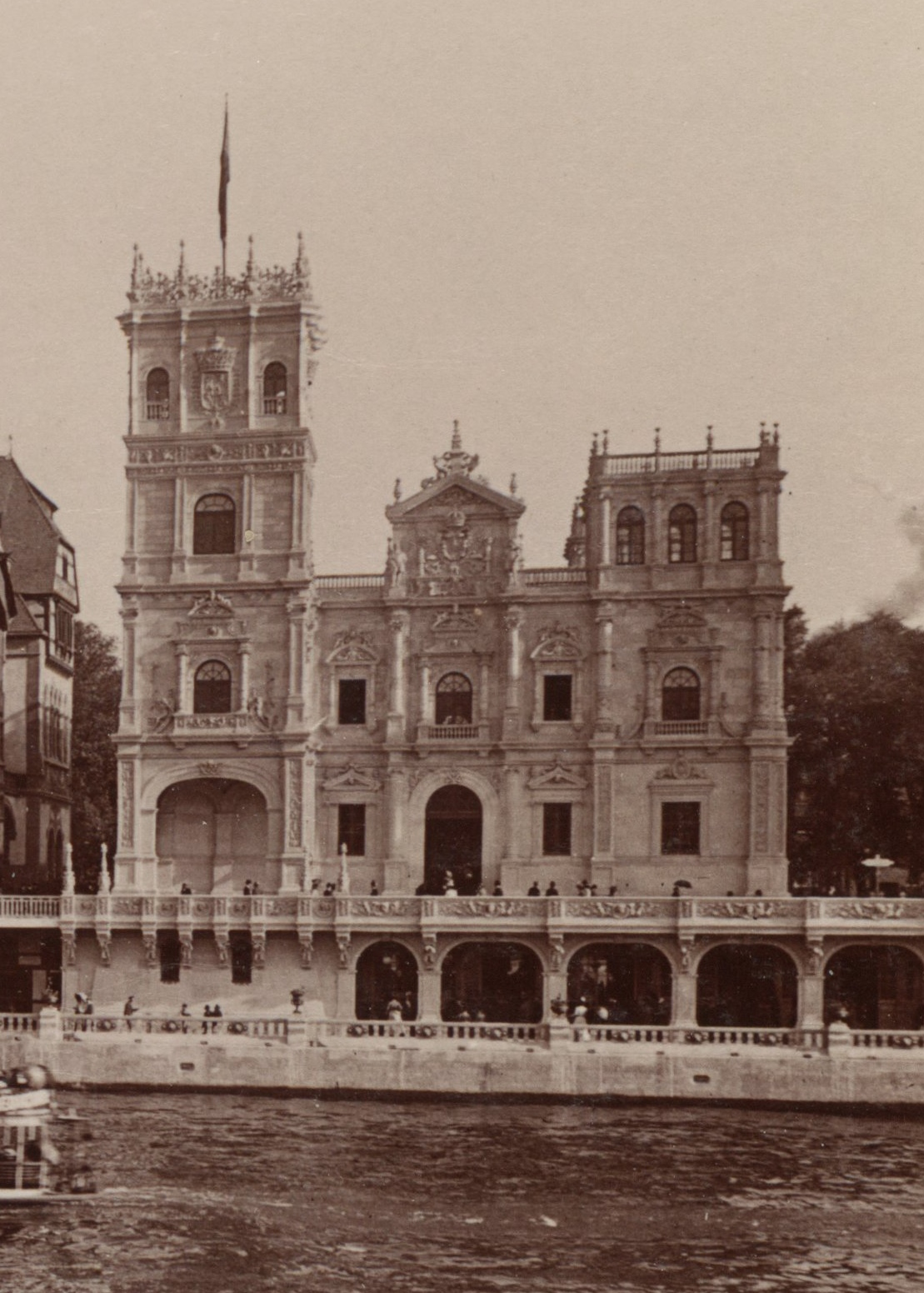
- Pavilion of Spain at Exposition Universelle
- Interactive map of the Royal Pavilion of Spain area
- Alternative names: Spanish pavilion

General information
- Status: Demolished
- Type: Exhibition Pavilion
- Architectural style: Neo-Plateresque
- Location: Exposition Universelle (1900), Rue des nations, Paris, France
- Inaugurated: 8 May 1900

Height
- Height: 26 metres (85 ft)

Design and construction
- Architect: José Urioste Velada

The Royal Pavilion of Spain was the exhibition national pavilion of the Kingdom of Spain at the 1900 Paris Universal Exposition. It was a temporary building by architect José Urioste Velada in Neo-Plateresque style located on the Quai d'Orsay. It housed a Retrospective Exhibition of Spanish Art, the Royal Office of the Spanish Commissioner at the Fair and the first restaurant in History with a completely electric kitchen.

== Background ==
Fifty-six countries were invited to have pavilions at the 1900 Paris Universal Exposition, and forty accepted, being Spain one of them. The Rue des Nations was created along the banks of the Seine between the esplanade of Les Invalides and the Champ de Mars for the national pavilions of the "great countries". The foundation works for the docks were carried out by the French administration, although each country had to pay the expenses corresponding to the adaptation of its plot. Each country had to design and build its pavilion at its own expense and was free to select any architectural style that represented a period in its history. The pavilions were all temporary, made of plaster and staff on a metal frame, and were demolished when the Exposition ended. They were oriented towards the Seine, so that their façades were mirrored in the river.

== Design and construction ==
Spain accepted to take part in the Fair in 1896 and was granted its building plot on 17 December 1897. It was located between the ones of Germany and Monaco, on the left bank of the Seine, on the Quai d'Orsay, between Pont des Invalides and Pont de l'Alma.

The building built was designed by architect José Urioste Velada in Neo-Plateresque style and was inspired by the sixteenth century plateresque façades of the Colegio Mayor de San Ildefonso in Alcalá de Henares, the University of Salamanca and the Alcázar of Toledo. It had dimensions of 25 metres (82 ft) on the front and 28.5 metres (94 ft) on the side with an annexed square tower of 8 metres (26 ft) on each side and 26 metres (85 ft) high. Only iron, wood, plaster, glass and zinc were used in its construction. The two-storey main body was articulated around a central glass-covered porticoed kind of Andalusian patio decorated with elements copied from the Colegio del Arzobispo in Salamanca and the Hospital de Santa Cruz in Toledo. In the center of the patio there was a bronze statue of Diego Velázquez by Mariano Benlliure.

Urioste was awarded at the Fair with a gold medal for the design of the pavilion.

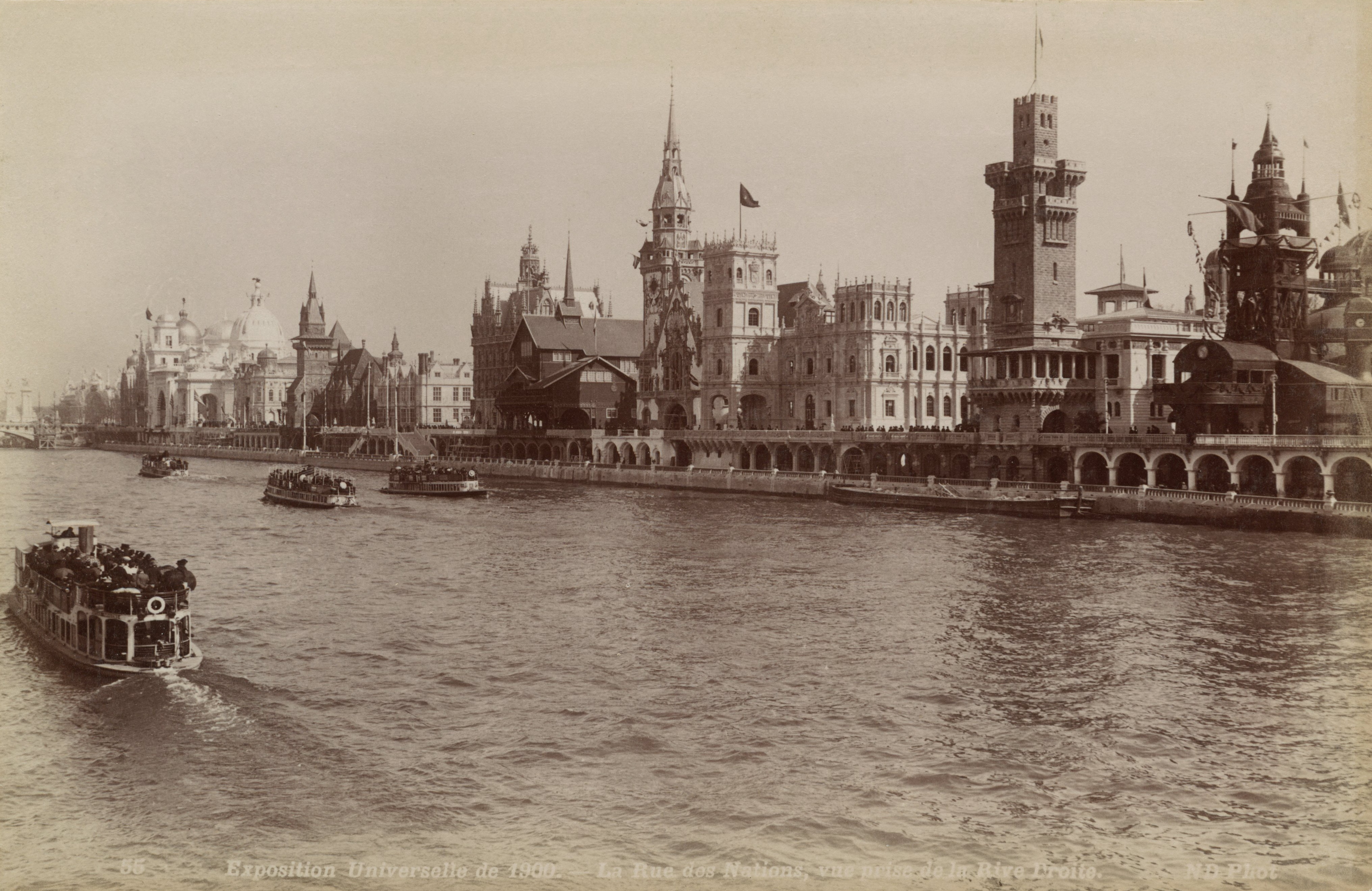
La Rue des Nations. From right to left: Pavilions of Sweden, Monaco, Spain, Germany, Norway and Belgium

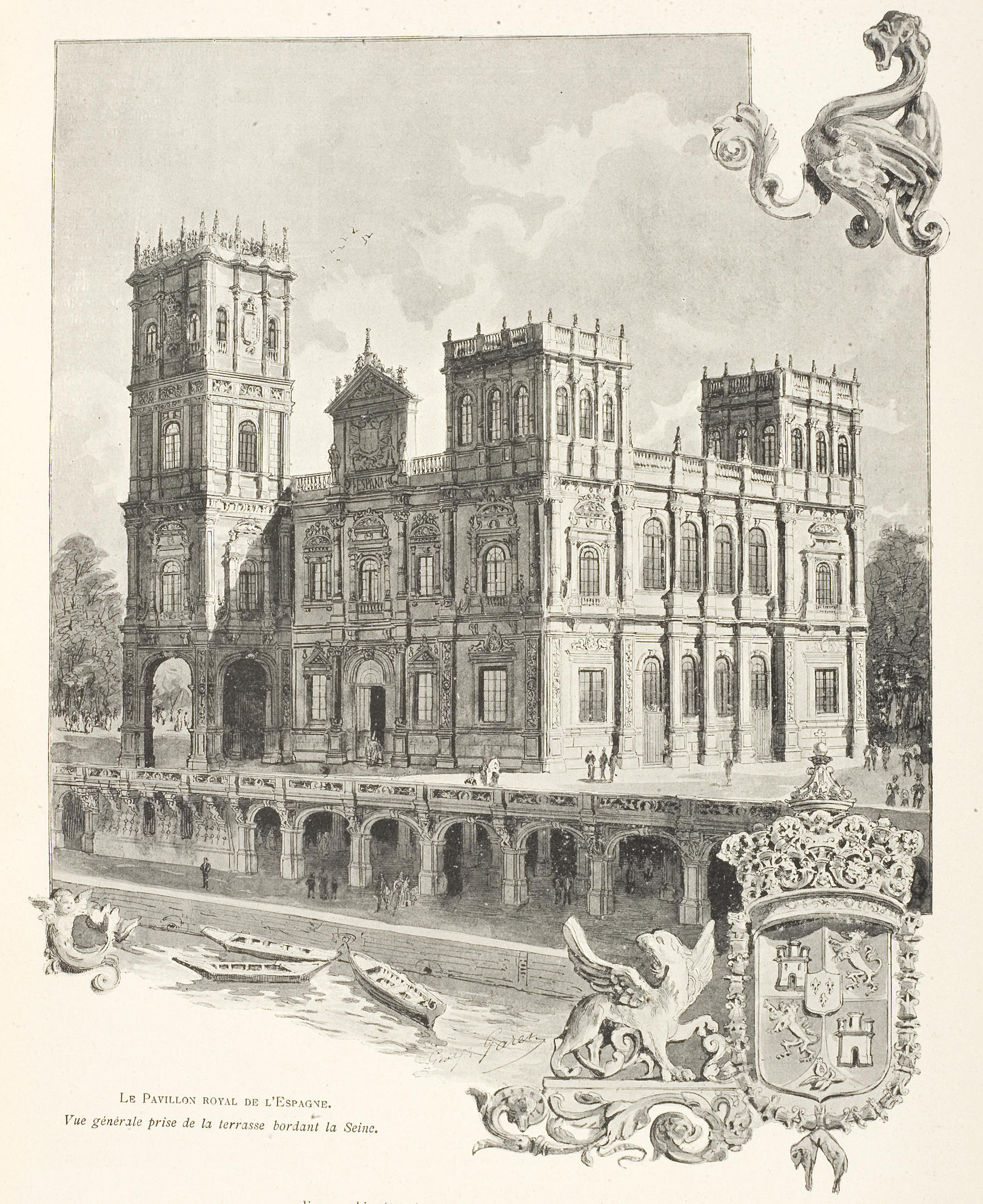
Engraving by Georges Garen

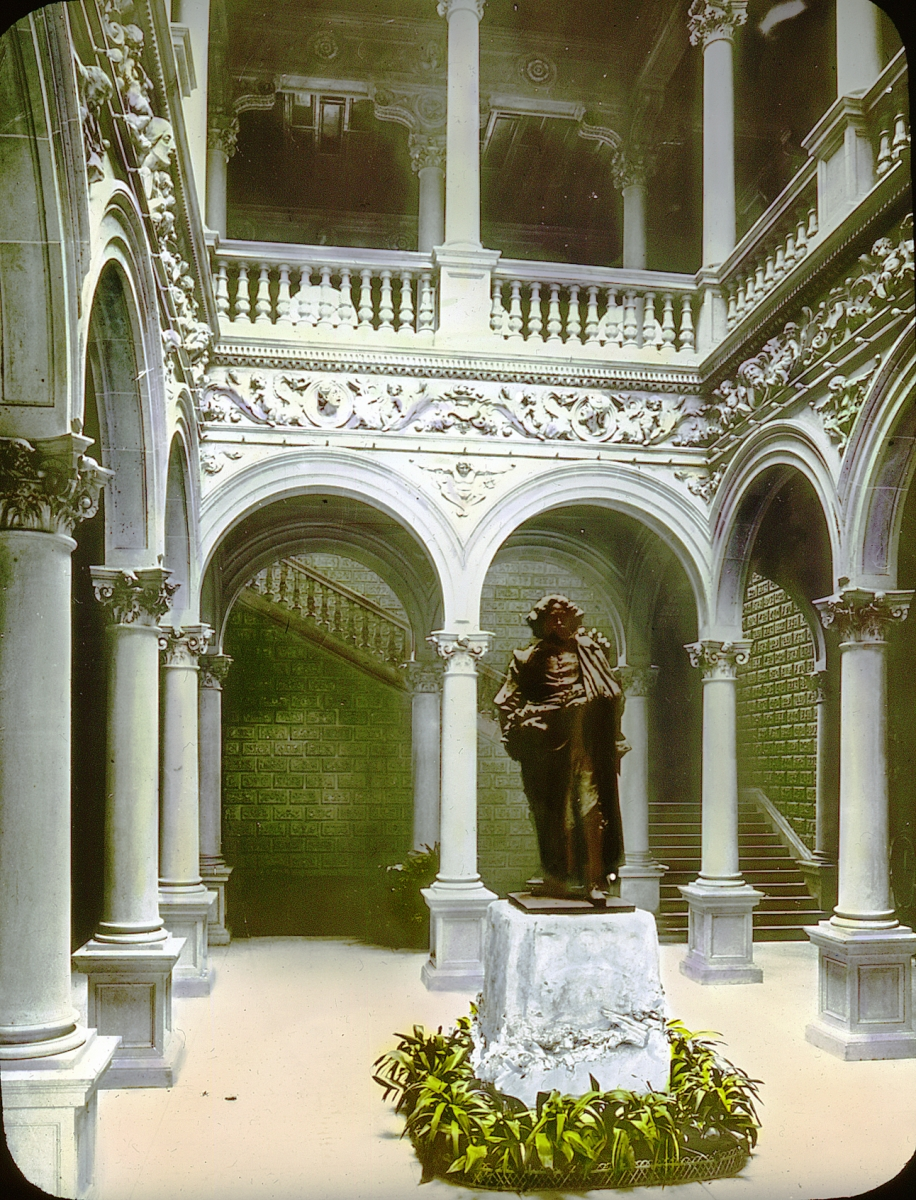
Central patio with the statue of Velázquez by Benlliure

== Inauguration ==
The Royal Pavilion of Spain was officially inaugurated on 8 May 1900 with the presence of the President of France Émile Loubet, the Infanta Eulalia of Spain, the Exposition Commissioner-General Alfred Picard, the Spanish Royal Commissioner José Osorio, 9th Duke of Sesto and the Ambassador of Spain to France Fernando León y Castillo.

== Usage ==
It housed the Retrospective Exhibition of Spanish Art formed by the collection of tapestries, in which thirty-seven pieces made between the fifteenth and eighteenth centuries from the Royal Collections were exhibited. In addition, the exhibition contained armors, helmets and weapons from the Royal Armoury, other artworks from private collections and a library. The pavilion was also used for administrative services, since the Royal Office of the Spanish Commissioner was at the tower, and for official receptions.

In the basement it housed a Spanish-themed café-restaurant concert called La Feria, which was a French concession that served Spanish food and drink in a folkloric setting with live performances. It was the first restaurant in History with a completely electric kitchen. They bet on electricity because the priceless artworks displayed on the upper floors could not be near any combustion fires, whether they were gas or coal. Thus, they chose to use only state-of-the-art electrical appliances, from the coffee maker to the stoves or ovens.

== Other sites at the Fair ==
In addition to the national pavilion, the Royal Office of the Commissioner managed other spaces at the Fair. The Spanish industrial, commercial, scientific and cultural exhibitors were distributed among the national sections of the different thematic pavilions. Like the paintings that were exhibited at the Spanish section of the Grand Palais or the agriculture and food exhibitors that were located at a section of the Palace of Agriculture and Food. In total, Spain managed 10,277 m^{2} (110,620 sq ft) of the 634,000 m^{2} (6,820,000 sq ft) of exhibition space at the Fair.

Among the Spanish works of art exhibited at the Grand Palais there were paintings by Santiago Arcos, Ramon Casas, Ulpiano Checa, Antonio Fabrés, Mariano Fortuny y Madrazo, José Jiménez Aranda, José Pinazo Martínez, María Luisa de la Riva, Enrique Simonet, Joaquín Sorolla, Carlos Vázquez Úbeda and engravings by Daniel Urrabieta Vierge; all of them awarded at the Fair. There were exhibited also sculptures by Antonio Alsina, Mariano Benlliure, Miguel Blay, Enric Clarasó and Agustí Querol Subirats. Among the awards received, the Grand Prix that Sorolla receives for his paintings, especially for Sad Inheritance, the one that Urrabieta receives for his engravings and those that Benlliure and Blay receive for their sculptures, stand out.

L'Andalousie au temps des maures (transl. Andalusia In The Time Of The Moors) was a 5,000 m^{2} (54,000 sq ft) Spanish-themed open air attraction with folkloric live performances at Quai Debilly, at the western end of Trocadéro, on the right bank of the Seine, featuring full-scale moorish architecture reproductions from the Alhambra, Córdoba, Toledo, the Alcázar of Seville and an 80 m (260 ft) tall reproduction of the Giralda. It was a French-produced attraction that had no relation with the official Spanish representatives, authorities or the Royal Office of the Commissioner at the Fair.

== Cost ==
The Spanish government spent just over two million pesetas^{[a]} in all its participation in the 1900 Paris Exhibition, this includes the costs of the construction of the national pavilion, the arrangement of the national sections at the thematic pavilions, the transport of all the collections to the Exhibition site and the expenses of the Royal Office of the Commissioner and the diplomatic and consular staff in Paris. That cost was modest compared to what other countries spent on their participation in the Fair, which in some case reached to be more than twenty times that amount.

== Reception ==
The building architectural design received generally positive reviews and was awarded with a gold medal. Critics praised "the nobility of its lines, its harmony, its aristocratic look, its elegance and its seriousness", although some visitors had a feeling of yesteryear, as seeing a "melancholic grandeur" on it. The Retrospective Exhibition of Art on display received as well generally positive reviews for "incomparable, superb and of great historical beauty". Some visitors, however, criticized the lack of services in the pavilion for visitors such as guides, newspapers, desks or public telephones.

Much of the negative reviews were reserved for La Feria café-restaurant in particular, for the idealized festive flamenco-themed image that the French concession was giving of a folkloric Spain that overshadowed the image of a "serious, modest, noble and modern European nation" that was trying to give the official representation. L'Andalousie au temps des maures received as well negative reviews for this same reason.

== Notes ==
a. In Spain, two million pesetas (€12,020) in 1900, adjusted for inflation using the consumer price index, in 2022 would be approximately €7.8 million, while its purchasing power would be €65–137 million.
