= The Return from Fishing: Hauling the Boat =

1894 painting by Joaquín Sorolla

- El regreso de la pesca: remolcando el barco (Spanish)
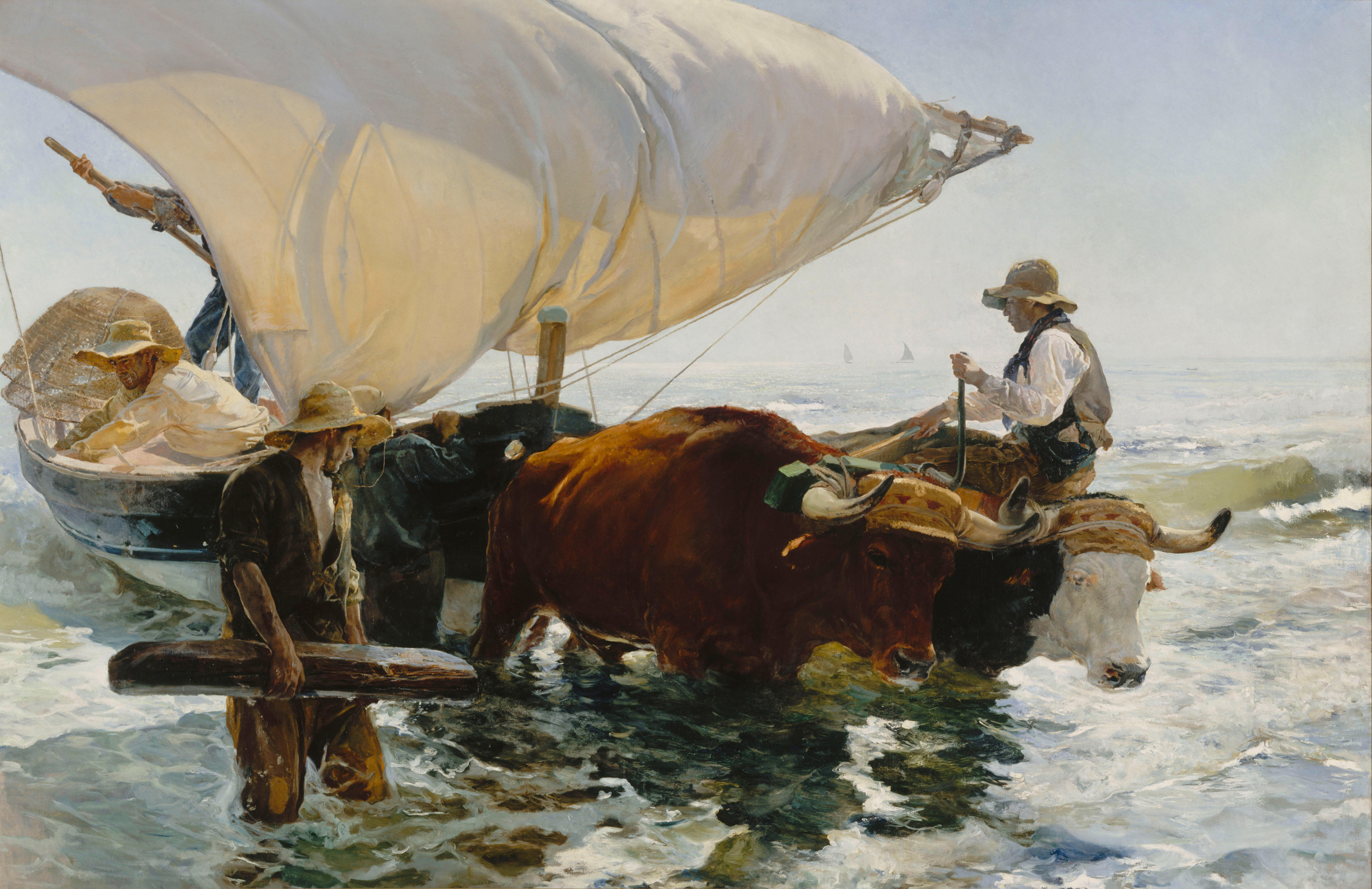
- Artist: Joaquín Sorolla
- Year: 1894
- Medium: Oil painting
- Movement: Postimpressionism
- Dimensions: 265 cm × 403 cm (104 in × 159 in)
- Location: Musée d'Orsay, Paris

The Return from Fishing: Hauling the Boat (French: Retour de la pêche: halage de la barque, Spanish: El regreso de la pesca: remolcando el barco) is an oil on canvas by the Spanish painter Joaquín Sorolla in 1894. Large in size, 265 cm × 403 cm (104 in × 159 in), it has been exhibited at the Musée d'Orsay since 1977. The painting depicts the return of a fishing boat with a lateen sail. Two oxen tow the boat on a beach surrounded by fishermen.

== Description ==
The scene takes place by the sea, when a fishing boat returns to El Cabañal beach, in Valencia. In the center of the composition, two oxen in the foreground pull a Catalan boat. The flapping sail is inflated by the wind and seems to help them. On the left in the foreground, a fisherman waits with a plank, probably the one on which the boat will be placed when the time comes. Another sailor is seated on the neck of one of the oxen which he seems to be guiding. In the background, in the shadows, another sailor is watching in the boat. Finally, in the background, in the light, a last fisherman in the boat adjusts a sheet so that the wind facilitates the maneuver.

The entire composition stands out against blue backgrounds (sea below, sky above). Sorolla brings out bursts of light from the chiaroscuros caused by the shadow of the sail.

== Reception ==
The painting was a resounding success with city dwellers seduced by “its Mediterranean atmosphere [...] the manual work and liveliness”. The painter received the highest distinction awarded at the exhibition, and the canvas was purchased by the Musée du Luxembourg.

== History ==
The canvas was acquired by the French State in 1895 at the Salon for 6000 francs. It was successively exhibited at the Musée du Luxembourg, the Louvre (1922), the Musée national d'art moderne (1946) until 1977 when it was attributed to the Louvre and since then exhibited at the Musée d'Orsay.

The painting has been exhibited internationally many times, including notably:

- Salon de la Société des artistes français - palais des Champs Elysées - Paris, 1895
- Joaquin Sorolla y Bastida - IBM Gallery of science and art - New York, 1989
- Joaquin Sorolla y Bastida - The Saint Louis Gallery - Saint Louis, 1989
- Joaquin Sorolla y Bastida - San Diego Museum of Art - San Diego, 1989
- Joaquin Sorolla y Bastida - Institut Valencià d'Art Modern - Valencia, 1989 - 1990
- Sargent-Sorolla - Fundación Caja Madrid - Madrid, 2006 - 2007
- Sargent-Sorolla - Petit Palais - Musée des Beaux-Arts de la Ville de Paris - Paris, 2007
- Joaquin Sorolla 1863-1923 - Museo Nacional del Prado - Madrid, 2009
- L'Espagne entre deux siècles de Zuloaga à Picasso - musée de l'Orangerie - Paris, 2011 - 2012
- Joaquín Sorolla. Spaniens Meister des Lichts - de:Kunsthalle der Hypo-Kulturstiftung - Munich, 2016
- Sorolla. Un peintre espagnol à Paris - fr:Musée des Impressionnismes Giverny - Giverny, 2016
- Sorolla: Spanish Master of Light - The National Gallery - London, 2019
