= Joaquín Sorolla García Dressed in White =

1896 painting by Joaquín Sorolla

- Joaquín Sorolla García vestido de blanco (Spanish)
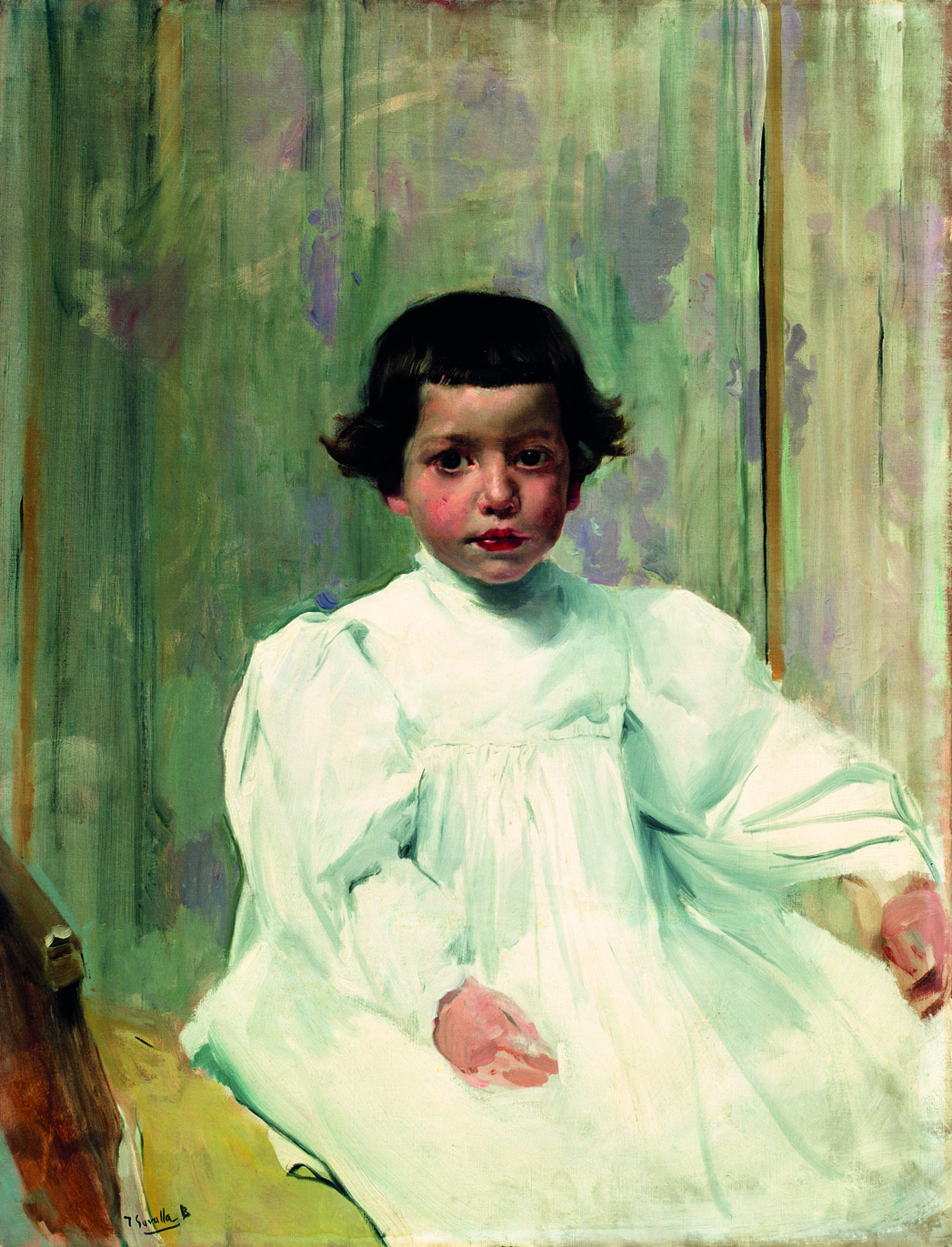
- Artist: Joaquín Sorolla
- Year: 1896
- Medium: oil on canvas
- Dimensions: 85 cm × 65 cm (33 in × 26 in)
- Location: Sorolla Museum, Madrid

Joaquín Sorolla García Dressed in White (Spanish: Joaquín Sorolla García vestido de blanco) is an oil-on-canvas painting by the Spanish artist Joaquín Sorolla, from 1896. The painting is part of the collection of the Sorolla Museum in Madrid. In 1951, the painter's son, Joaquín Sorolla García, donated the painting to the Sorolla Museum's Foundation, continuing his parents' practice of supporting the museum.

== Description ==
The painting is a child portrait of the painter's son, Joaquín Sorolla García. He is seen sitting on a wooden sofa, clad in a white dress (a full-sleeved white suit), posing for the painting. His left arm rests on the armrest while his right hand rests on his legs. The colourful grey, mauve, and light brown curtain in the background make the portrait brighter.

This was not the first time Joaquín Sorolla had painted members of his family. He had produced many portraits of his family before, such as that of his wife, Clotilde García del Castillo, and even his ancestors. For example, his son Joaquin also appears in the portrait Mi familia along with his wife Clotilde and his daughters María and Elena. In 1917, he again painted a portrait of his now adult son, Joaquín Sorolla García, entitled Joaquín Sorolla García sentado, that was exhibited at the Sorolla Museum. Another portrait of his son was Joaquín Sorolla García y su perro.
