= Domingo Muñoz =

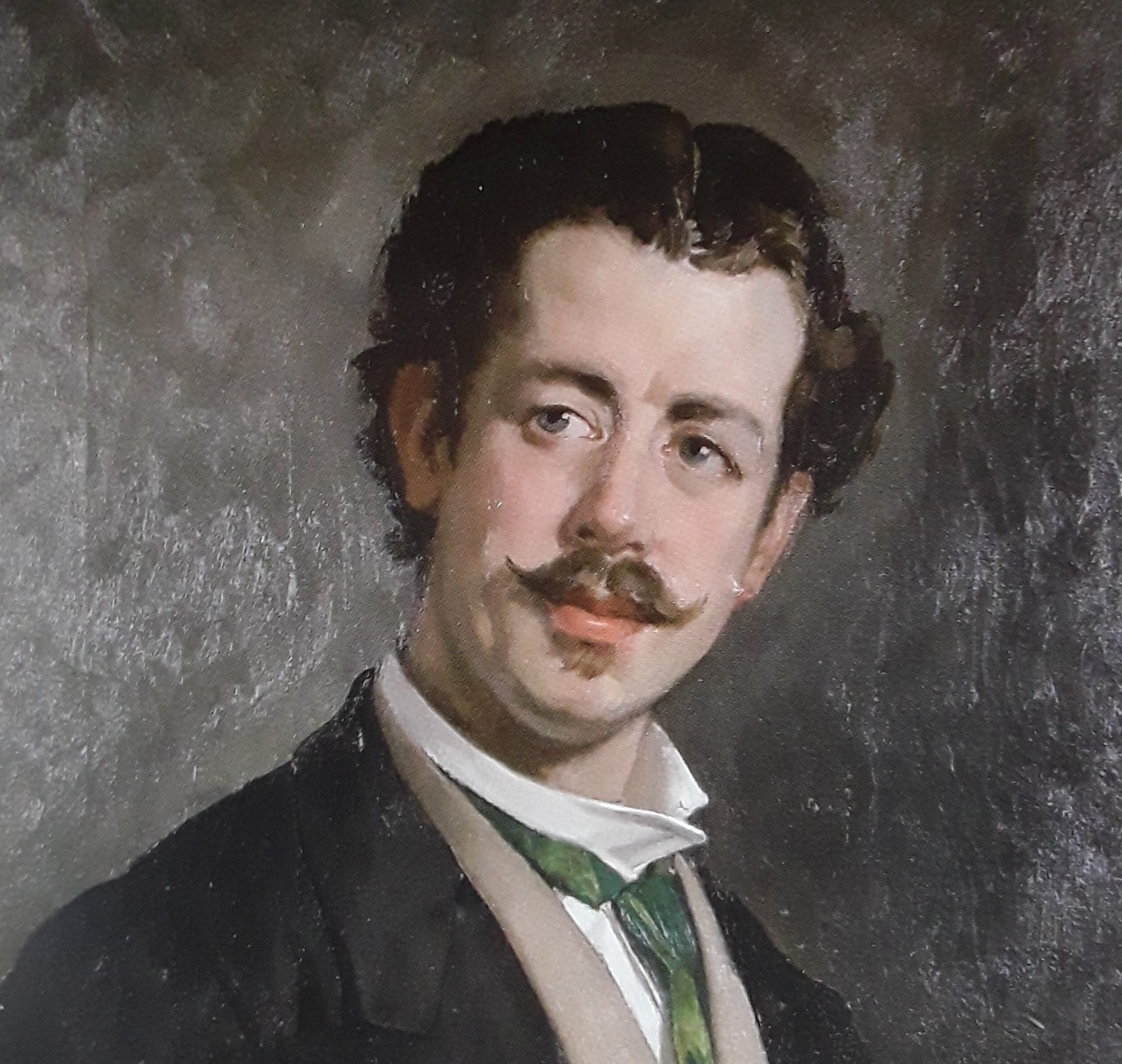
Domingo Muñoz (c.1869), by Francisco Pradilla.

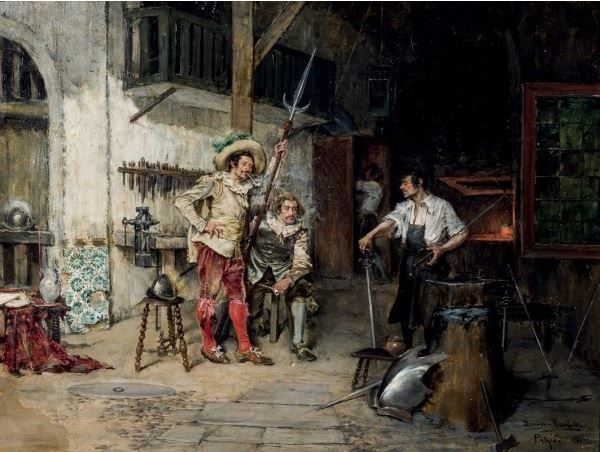
The Sword Sharpener

Domingo Muñoz Cuesta (1850, Madrid - 9 August 1935, Madrid) was a Spanish painter and illustrator; best known for genre scenes and historical period pieces, focusing on military themes.

== Biography ==
Cuesta received his artistic instruction at the " Special School of Painting, Sculpture and Engraving", a satellite school of the Real Academia de Bellas Artes de San Fernando. His primary instructor there was Francisco Domingo Marqués. During the 1880s, he studied at various schools in Rome.

His first public works were his caricatures drawn for El Mundo Cómico (1876) and his drawings for La Ilustración Militar and La Ilustración Española y Americana. He won an award in a contest sponsored by the latter.

Later, he participated in exhibits at the "Sociedad La Acuarela" (watercolors), Círculo de Bellas Artesand, at the Hernández Galleries. He also did illustrations for the edition of Gil Blas de Santillana, published by the Casa Editorial La Maravilla.

He was married to the painter, María Luisa de la Riva.
