= María Luisa de la Riva y Callol-Muñoz =

Spanish artist (1865–1926)

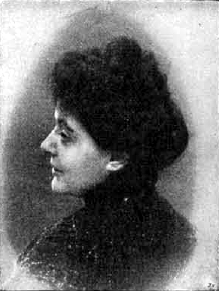
- Born: María Luisa de la Riva y Callol; 4 April 1865; Zaragoza, Spain
- Died: 22 September 1926 (aged 61); Madrid, Spain
- Known for: Painting
- Spouse: Domingo Muñoz Cuesta

María Luisa de la Riva y Callol-Muñoz (1865−1926) was a Spanish painter.

== Biography ==
Riva y Callol de Muñoz was born on 4 April 1865 in Zaragoza, Spain. She studied with Ricardo Bellver and Antonio Pérez Rubio. She was married to fellow painter Domingo Muñoz.

She exhibited regularly at the Exposiciones Nacionales de Bellas Artes where she won medals in 1897, 1901, 1887, and 1895. Riva y Callol de Muñoz exhibited her work at the Woman's Building at the 1893 World's Columbian Exposition in Chicago, Illinois. and she also exhibited at the Exposition Universelle in 1889 and at the salon of the Union des femmes peintres et sculpteurs (Paris) in 1902

Riva y Callol de Muñoz was a member of the Union of Women Painters and Sculptors of Vienna as well as the Society of Artists of Berlin and the Society of Artists of Vienna.

She died in Madrid, Spain on 22 September 1926. Her paintings are in the Museo del Prado's collection.

== Gallery ==
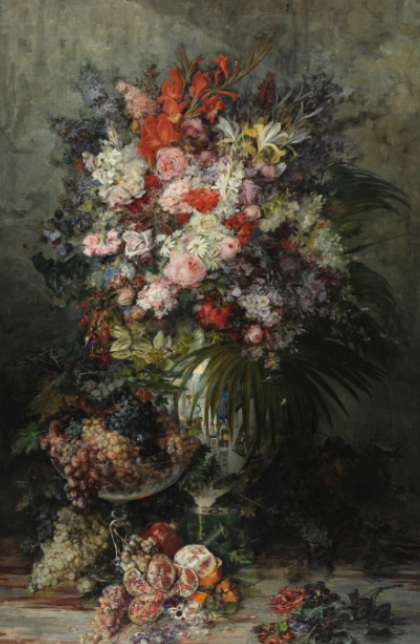
Flowers and fruits

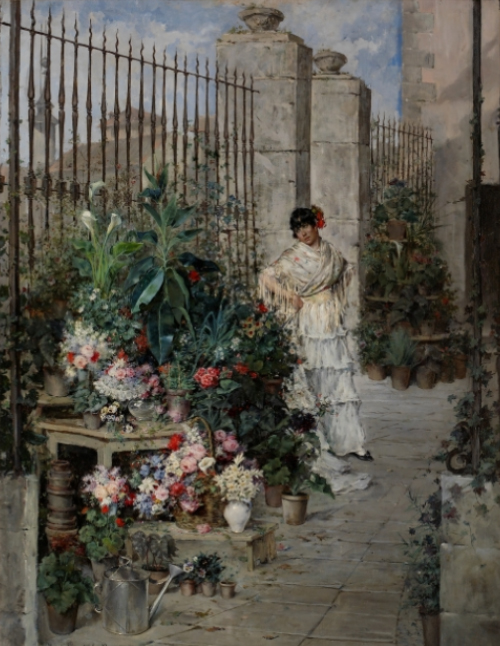
Flower stand
