= Sad Inheritance! =

1899 painting by Joaquín Sorolla

- Spanish: ¡Triste herencia!
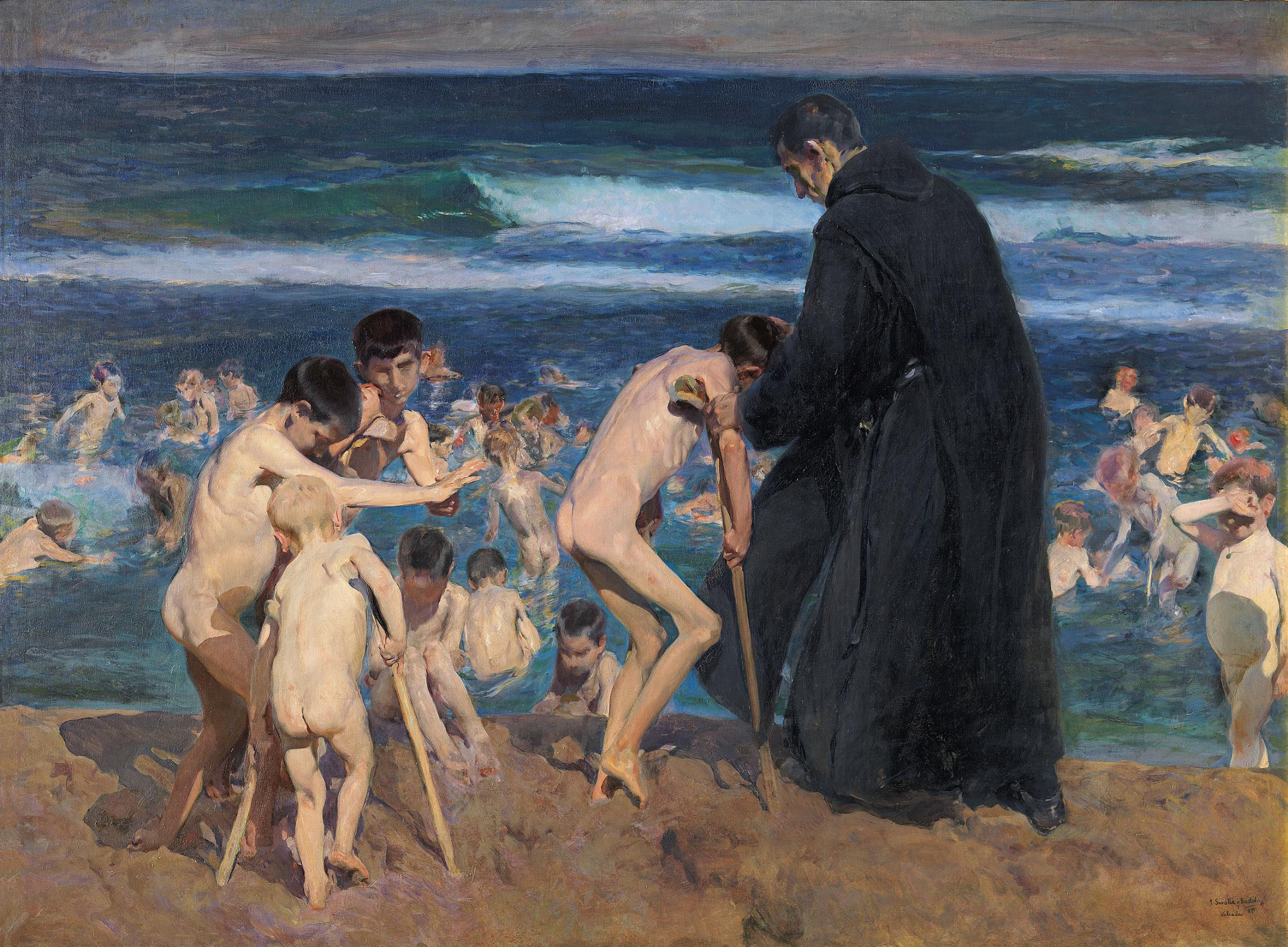
- Artist: Joaquín Sorolla
- Year: 1899
- Medium: oil painting
- Dimensions: 212 cm × 288 cm (83 in × 113 in)
- Location: Private collection

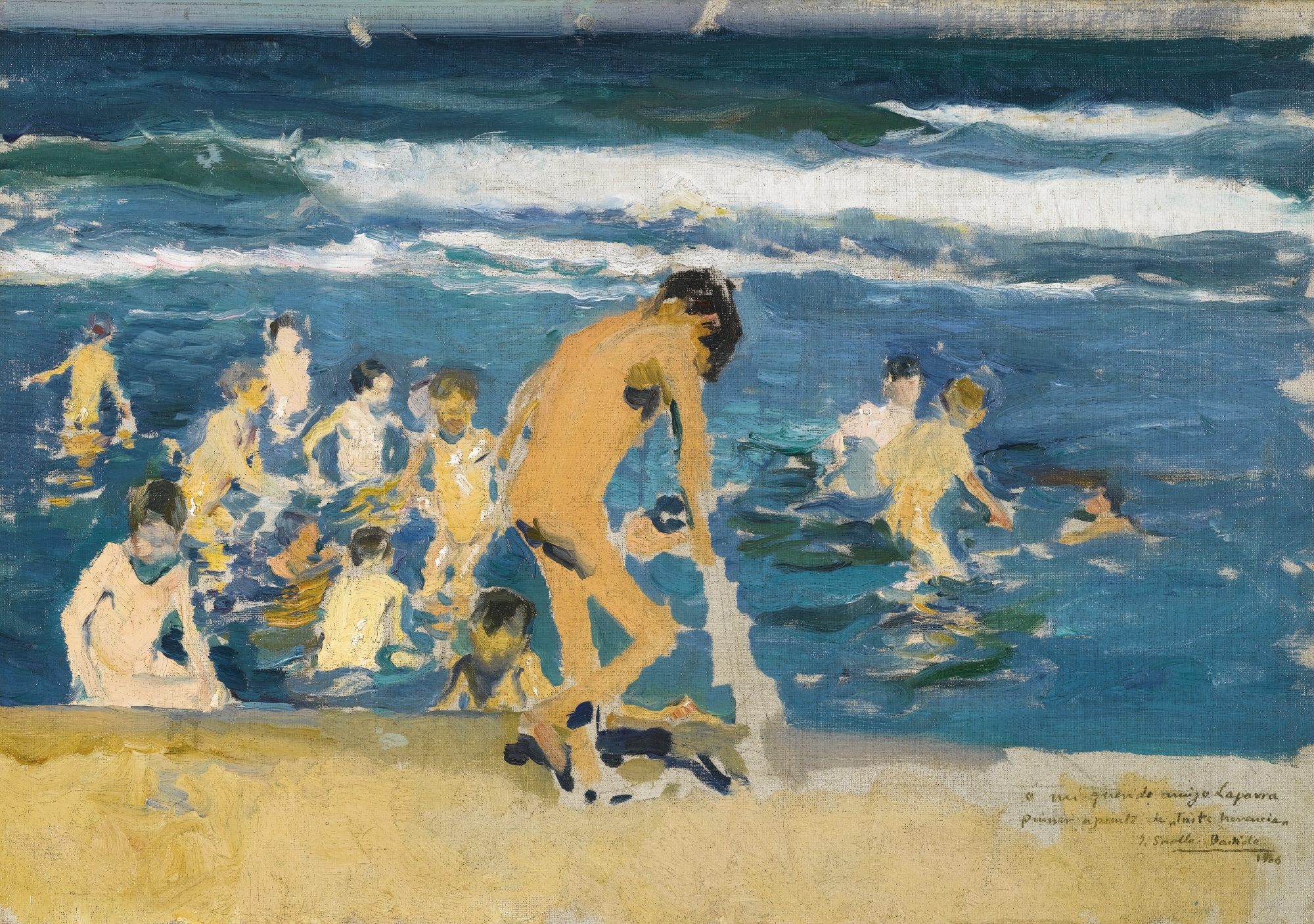
Study given to William Laparra, sold in 2014

Sad Inheritance! (Spanish: ¡Triste herencia!) is an 1899 oil painting by Spanish artist Joaquín Sorolla. The painting was held by Episcopal Church of the Ascension in New York for many years, until it was bought in 1981 by the Savings Bank of Valencia (now part of Bankia).

The large work measures 210 cm × 285 cm (83 in × 112 in). It depicts a crowd of sick and disabled naked children, including some using crutches due to polio, on the Malvarrosa beach in Valencia. They have been brought to the beach by a black-clothed monk from the Valencian asylum hospital of San Juan de Dios, to bathe in the seawater as a therapeutic measure. In the background, some children are already in the sea.

Sorolla reported coming across the scene himself, writing:

Estaba ocupado una mañana en hacer un boceto de pescadores valencianos, cuando distinguí a lo lejos, cerca del mar, un grupo de niños desnudos, a corta distancia de ellos, la figura de un sacerdote solitario. Eran los Niños del Hospital de San Juan de Dios, resaca de la sociedad, ciegos, locos, enclenques o leprosos. Inútil decir que la presencia de aquellos desgraciados me produjo una penosa impresión. No perdí el momento, y pedí y obtuve del director del Hospital la necesaria autorización para trabajar sobre el terreno y copiar aquel cuadro al natural.

("I was busy one morning making a sketch of Valencian fishermen, when I saw in the distance, near the sea, a group of naked children, a short distance from a single priest. They were children from the Hospital of San Juan de Dios, the detritus of society, blind, mad, disabled or leprous. Needless to say that the presence of those unfortunates made a painful impression on me. I did not miss the moment and sought and obtained the necessary authorization from the director of the Hospital to work on the spot and copy that scene from life.")

Sorolla exhibited the painting with other works at the Exposition Universelle in Paris in 1900, where he was awarded the grand prize, and he was awarded a medal of honour (medalla de honor) when it was exhibited at the National Exhibition of Fine Arts in Madrid in 1901. He offered to sell the painting to the Spanish state for 40,000 pesetas, but the acquisition was blocked by Conservative politicians.

The painting was sold in 1902 to the dealer Jesus Vidal in New York for the same price, 40,000 pesetas, and it was sold on in 1904 to John E. Berwind. It was exhibited at the Hispanic Society of America in New York in 1909. Berwind gave it to the Episcopal Church of the Ascension on Fifth Avenue in New York, where it remained for many years.

It was put up for sale at Sotheby's in New York in June 1981 and bought by the Savings Bank of Valencia (the Caja de Ahorros de Valencia, later part of Bancaja and now part of Bankia) for $240,000.

An oil study was sold at Sotheby's in London in 2014 for £182,500; Sorolla had given this as a gift to his friend William Laparra in 1906. Sorolla gave a different sketch to John Singer Sargent in 1903 (now in the Masaveu Collection in Madrid), and a third study was given to William Merritt Chase also in 1906.
