= Joaquín Sorolla =

Spanish painter (1863–1923)

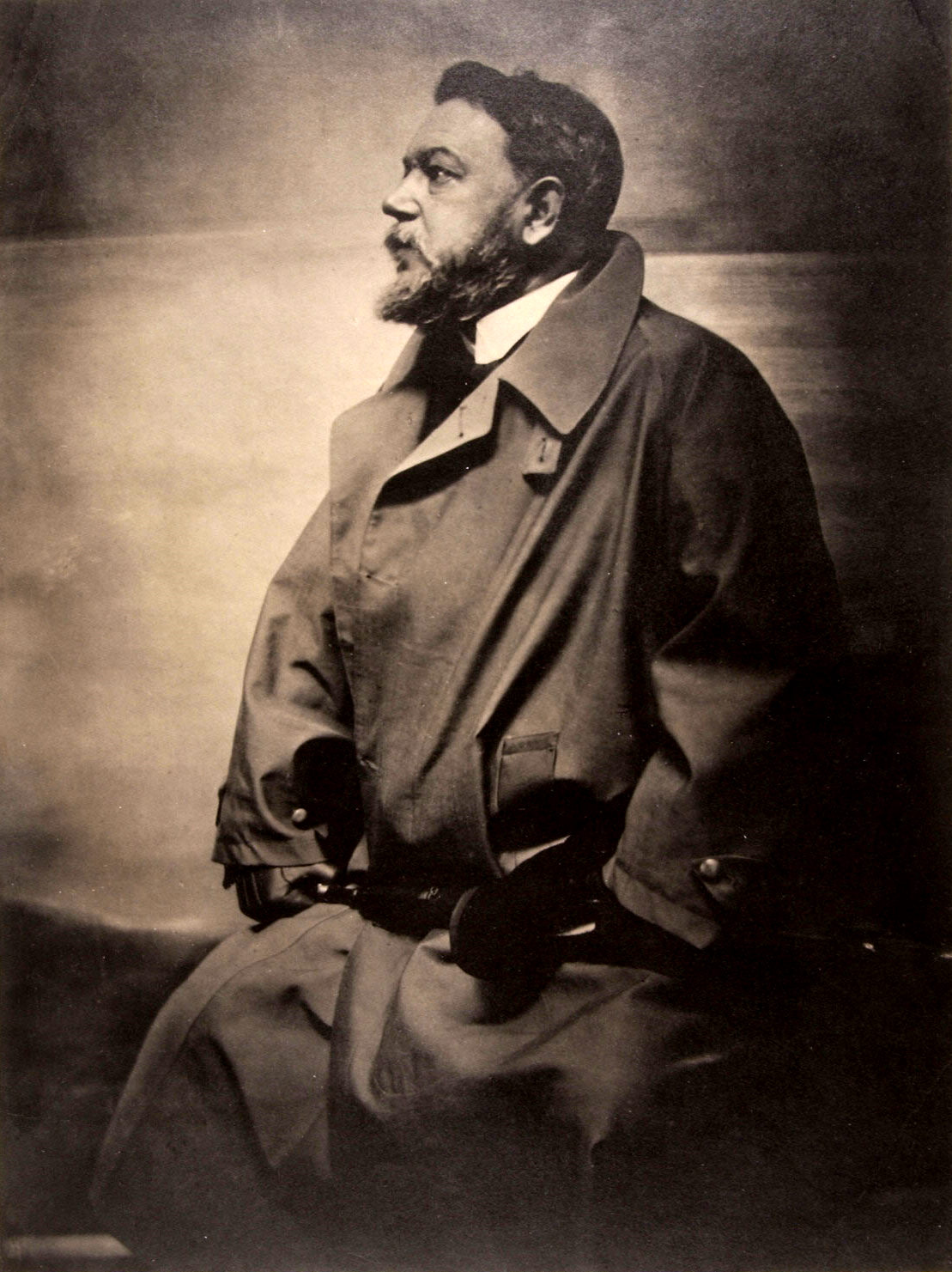
- Platinum print of Sorolla by Gertrude Käsebier, c. 1908
- Born: Joaquín Sorolla y Bastida; 27 February 1863; Valencia, Spain
- Died: 10 August 1923 (aged 60); Cercedilla, Spain
- Known for: Painting, landscape art
- Movement: Impressionism, Luminism
- Spouse: Clotilde García del Castillo (married 1888)

Joaquín Sorolla y Bastida (Note: Spanish pronunciation: [xoaˈkin soˈɾoʎa] Valencian pronunciation: [dʒuaˈkim soˈɾoʎa]) (27 February 1863 – 10 August 1923) was a Spanish painter. Sorolla excelled in the painting of portraits, landscapes, and monumental works of social and historical themes. His most typical works are characterized by a dexterous representation of the people and landscapes of Spain under the bright Spanish sun and the sunlit water.

== Biography ==
=== Early life ===
Joaquín Sorolla was born on 27 February 1863 in Valencia, Spain. Sorolla was the eldest child born to a tradesman, also named Joaquín Sorolla, and his wife, Concepción Bastida. His sister, Concha, was born a year later. In August 1865, both children were orphaned when their parents died, possibly from cholera. They were thereafter cared for by their maternal aunt and uncle, a locksmith.

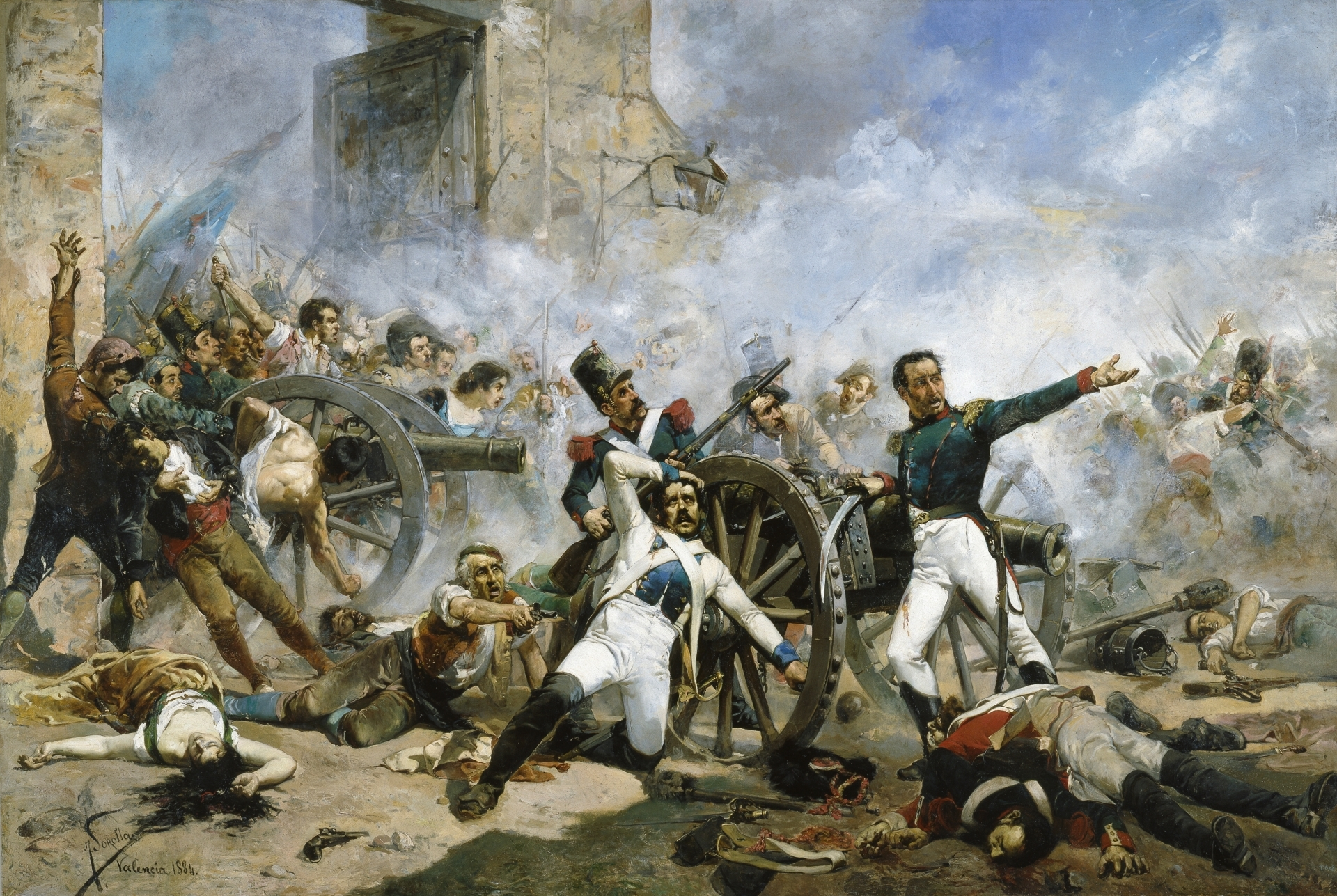
The death of Pedro Velarde y Santillán during the defence of the Monteleon Artillery Barracks, 1884, Museo del Prado, Madrid

He received his initial art education at the age of 9 in his native town, and then under a succession of teachers including Cayetano Capuz, Salustiano Asenjo. At the age of eighteen he travelled to Madrid, vigorously studying master paintings in the Museo del Prado. After completing his military service, Sorolla, at age twenty-two, obtained a grant which enabled a four-year term to study painting in Rome, Italy, where he was welcomed by and found stability in the example of Francisco Pradilla, the director of the Spanish Academy in Rome. A long sojourn to Paris in 1885 provided his first exposure to modern painting; of special influence were exhibitions of Jules Bastien-Lepage and Adolph von Menzel. Back in Rome he studied with José Benlliure, Emilio Sala, and José Villegas Cordero.

In 1888, Sorolla returned to Valencia to marry Clotilde García del Castillo, whom he had first met in 1879, while working in her father's studio. By 1895, they had three children together: Maria, born in 1890, Joaquín, born in 1892, and Elena, born in 1895. In 1890, they moved to Madrid, and for the next decade Sorolla's efforts as an artist were focused mainly on the production of large canvases of orientalist, mythological, historical, and social subjects, for display in salons and international exhibitions in Madrid, Paris, Venice, Munich, Berlin, and Chicago.

His first striking success was achieved with Another Marguerite (1892), which was awarded a gold medal at the National Exhibition in Madrid, then first prize at the Chicago International Exhibition, where it was acquired and subsequently donated to the Washington University in St. Louis Museum in St. Louis, Missouri. He soon rose to general fame and became the acknowledged head of the modern Spanish school of painting. His picture The Return from Fishing: Hauling the Boat (1894) was much admired at the Paris Salon and was acquired by the state for the Musée du Luxembourg. It indicated the direction of his mature output.

Sorolla painted two masterpieces in 1897 linking art and science: Portrait of Dr. Simarro at the microscope and A Research. These paintings were presented at the National Exhibition of Fine Arts held in Madrid in that year and Sorolla won the Prize of Honor. Here, he presents his friend Simarro as a man of science who transmits his wisdom investigating and, in addition, it is the triumph of naturalism, as it recreates the indoor environment of the laboratory, catching the luminous atmosphere produced by the artificial reddish-yellow light of a gas burner that contrasts with the weak mauvish afternoon light that shines through the window. These paintings may be among the most outstanding world paintings of this genre.

=== Sad Inheritance! ===
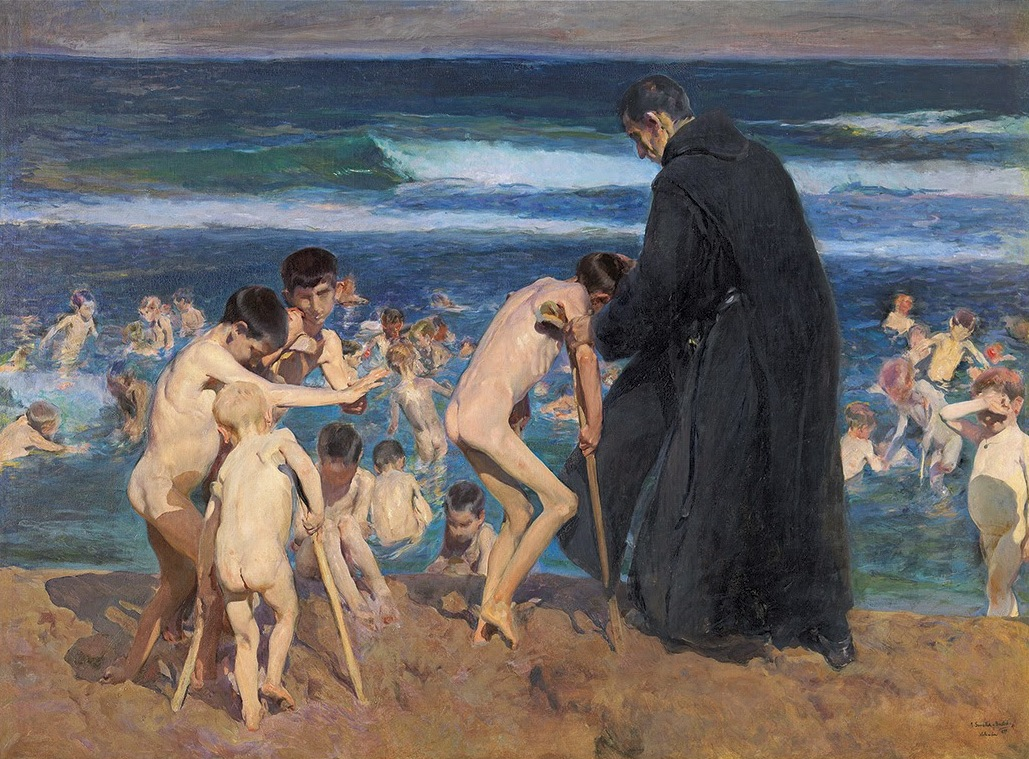
Sad Inheritance!, 1899. Crippled children bathing at the sea in Valencia; in the center the image of two children affected by polio (Bancaja Collection)

An even greater turning point in Sorolla's career was marked by the painting and exhibition of Sad Inheritance (1899, seen at right), an extremely large canvas, highly finished for public consideration. The subject was a depiction of crippled children bathing at the sea in Valencia, under the supervision of a monk. They are the victims of congenital syphilis the title implies. Campos has suggested that the polio epidemic that struck the land of Valencia some years earlier is present, possibly for the first time in the history of painting, through the image of two affected children. The painting earned Sorolla his greatest official recognition, the Grand Prix and a medal of honor at the Universal Exhibition in Paris in 1900, and the medal of honor at the National Exhibition in Madrid in 1901.

A series of preparatory oil sketches for Sad Inheritance was painted with the greatest luminosity and bravura, and foretold an increasing interest in shimmering light and of a medium deftly handled. Sorolla thought well enough of these sketches that he presented two of them as gifts to American artists; one to John Singer Sargent, the other to William Merritt Chase. After this painting Sorolla never returned to a theme of such overt social consciousness.

=== Maturity ===
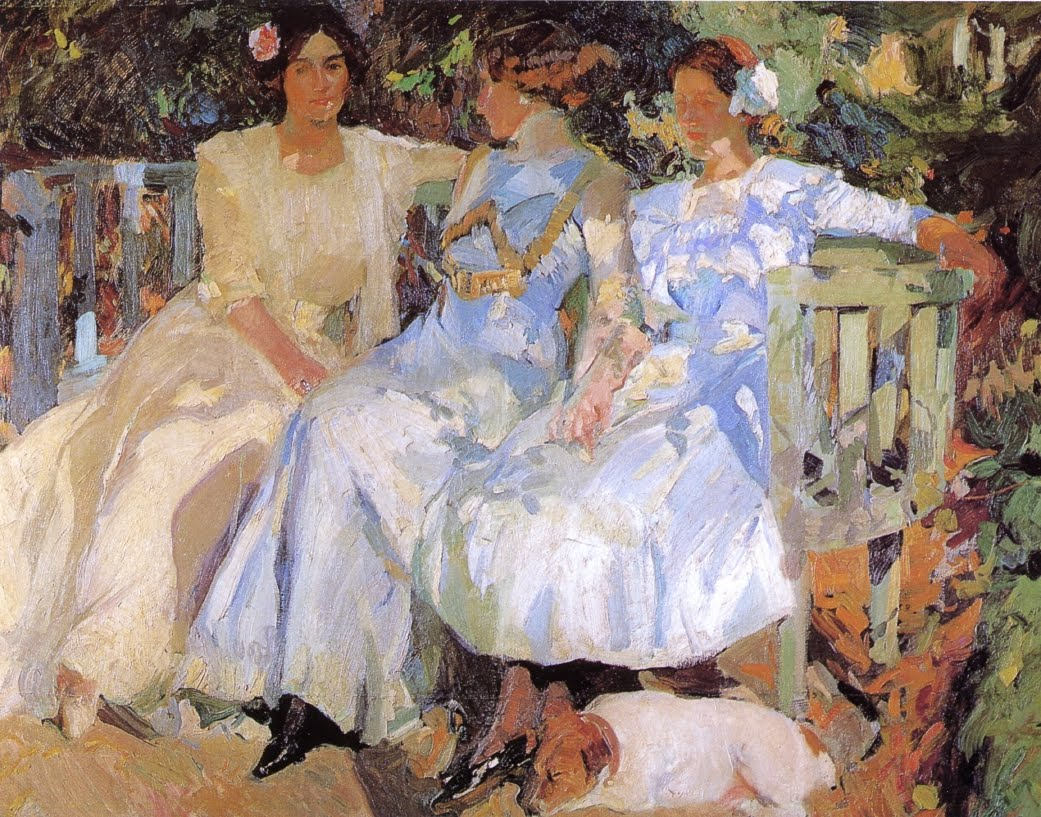
Mi Esposa e Hijas en el Jardín (My Wife and Daughters in the Garden) - 1910

The exhibit at the Paris Universal Exposition of 1900 won him a medal of honour and his nomination as Knight of the Legion of Honour; within the next few years Sorolla was honoured as a member of the Académie des Beaux-Arts, Paris, National Academy of Fine Arts, Lisbon, and Real Academia de Bellas Artes de San Carlos de Valencia, and as a Favourite Son of Valencia.

A special exhibition of his works—figure subjects, landscapes, and portraits—at the Galeries Georges Petit in Paris in 1906 eclipsed all his earlier successes and led to his appointment as Officer of the Legion of Honour. The show included nearly 500 works, early paintings as well as recent sun-drenched beach scenes, landscapes, and portraits, a productivity which amazed critics and was a financial triumph. Though subsequent large-scale exhibitions in Germany and London were greeted with more restraint, while in England in 1908 Sorolla met Archer Milton Huntington, who made him a member of the Hispanic Society of America in New York City, and invited him to exhibit there in 1909. The exhibition comprised 356 paintings, 195 of which sold. Sorolla spent five months in America and painted more than twenty portraits.

Sorolla's work is often exhibited together with that of his contemporaries and friends, John Singer Sargent and Anders Zorn.

=== Portraits ===
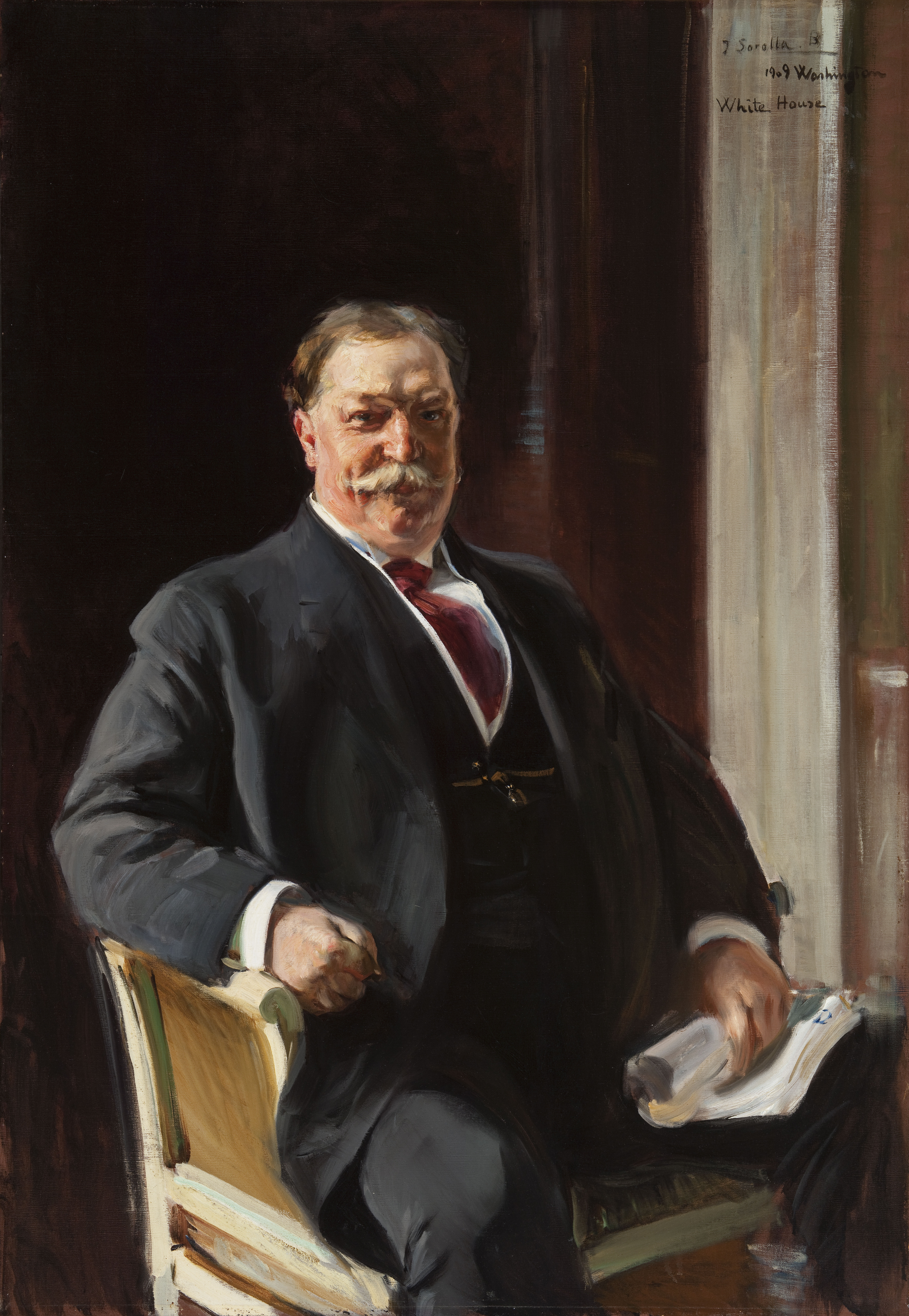
American President William Howard Taft, 1909, Taft Museum of Art

Although formal portraiture was not Sorolla's genre of preference, because it tended to restrict his creative appetites and could reflect his lack of interest in his subjects, the acceptance of portrait commissions proved profitable, and the portrayal of his family was irresistible. Sometimes the influence of Velázquez was uppermost, as in My Family (1901), a reference to Las Meninas which grouped his wife and children in the foreground, the painter reflected, at work, in a distant mirror. At other times the desire to compete with his friend John Singer Sargent was evident, as in Portrait of Mrs. Ira Nelson Morris and her children (1911). A series of portraits produced in the United States in 1909, commissioned through the Hispanic Society of America, was capped by the Portrait of Mr. Taft, President of the United States, This portrait, which was painted at the White House, is on permanent display at the Taft Museum of Art in Cincinnati, Ohio.

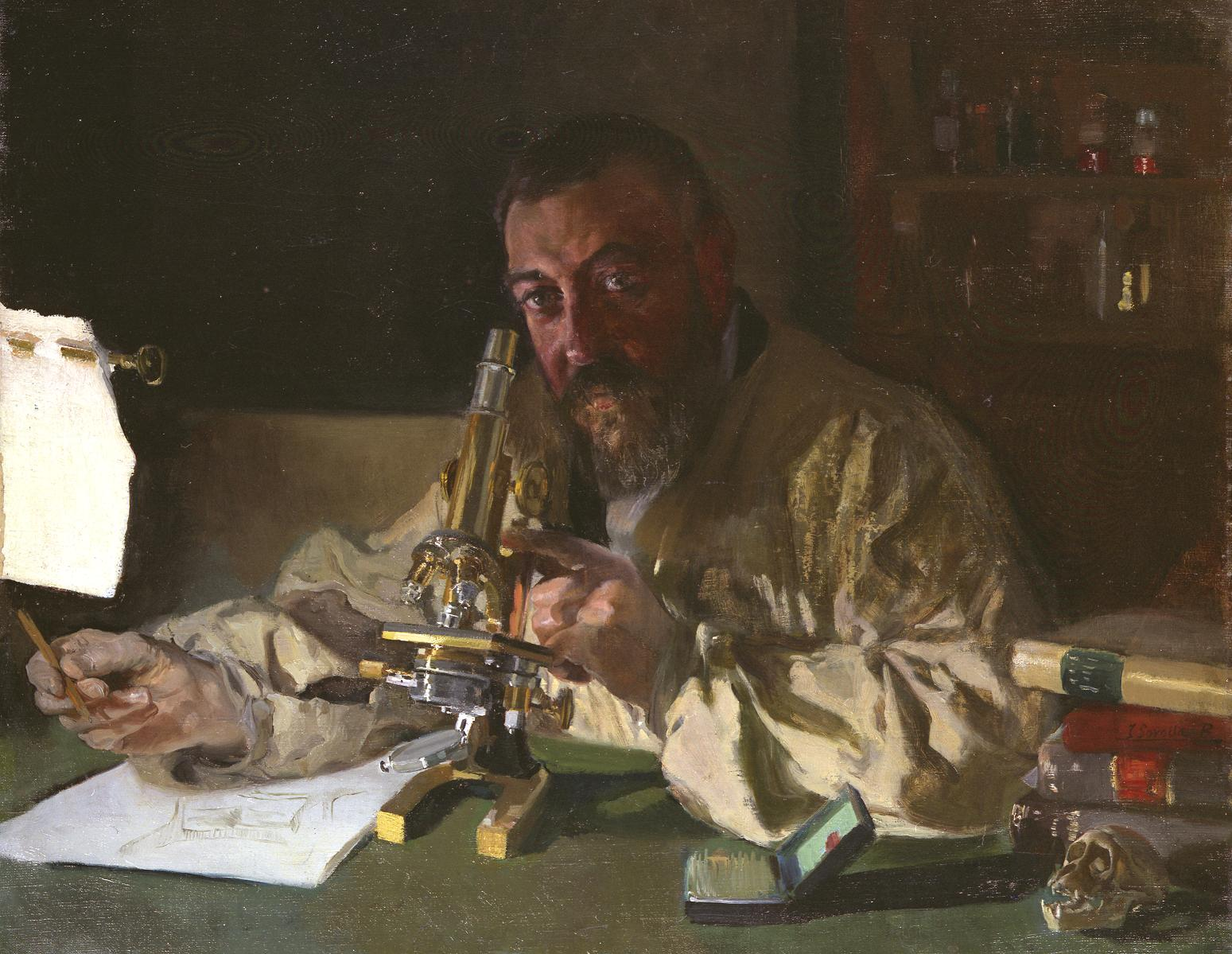
Portrait of Dr Simarro at the microscope, 1897 (Luis Simarro Legacy Trust, Fundación General, Complutense University)

The appearance of sunlight could be counted on to rouse his interest, and it was outdoors where he found his ideal portrait settings. Thus, not only did his daughter pose standing in a sun-dappled landscape for María at La Granja (1907), but so did Spanish royalty, for the Portrait of King Alfonso XIII in a Hussar's Uniform (1907). For Portrait of Mr. Louis Comfort Tiffany (1911), the American artist posed seated at his easel in his Long Island garden, surrounded by extravagant flowers. The conceit reaches its high point in My Wife and Daughters in the Garden (1910, see gallery below), in which the idea of traditional portraiture gives way to the sheer fluid delight of a painting constructed with thick passages of color, Sorolla's love of family and sunlight merged.

=== The Provinces of Spain ===
Early in 1911, Sorolla visited the United States for a second time, and exhibited 152 new paintings at the Saint Louis Art Museum and 161 at the Art Institute of Chicago a few weeks later. Later that year Sorolla met Archie Huntington in Paris and signed a contract to paint a series of oils on life in Spain. These 14 magnificent murals, installed to this day in the Hispanic Society of America building in Manhattan, range from 12 to 14 feet in height, and total 227 feet in length. The major commission of his career, it dominated the later years of Sorolla's life.

Huntington had envisioned the work depicting a history of Spain, but the painter preferred the less specific Vision of Spain, eventually opting for a representation of the regions of the Iberian Peninsula, and calling it The Provinces of Spain. Despite the immensity of the canvases, Sorolla painted all but one en plein air, and travelled to the specific locales to paint them: Navarre, Aragon, Catalonia, Valencia, Elche, Seville, Andalusia, Extremadura, Galicia, Guipuzcoa, Castile, Leon, and Ayamonte, at each site painting models posed in local costume. Each mural celebrated the landscape and culture of its region, panoramas composed of throngs of laborers and locals. By 1917 he was, by his own admission, exhausted. He completed the final panel by July 1919.

Sorolla suffered a stroke in 1920, while painting a portrait in his garden in Madrid. Paralysed for over four years, he died on 10 August 1923. He is buried in the Cementeri de Valencia, Spain.

The Sorolla Room, housing the Provinces of Spain at the Hispanic Society of America, opened to the public in 1926. The room closed for remodeling in 2008, and the murals toured museums in Spain for the first time. The Sorolla Room reopened in 2010, with the murals on permanent display.

== Legacy ==
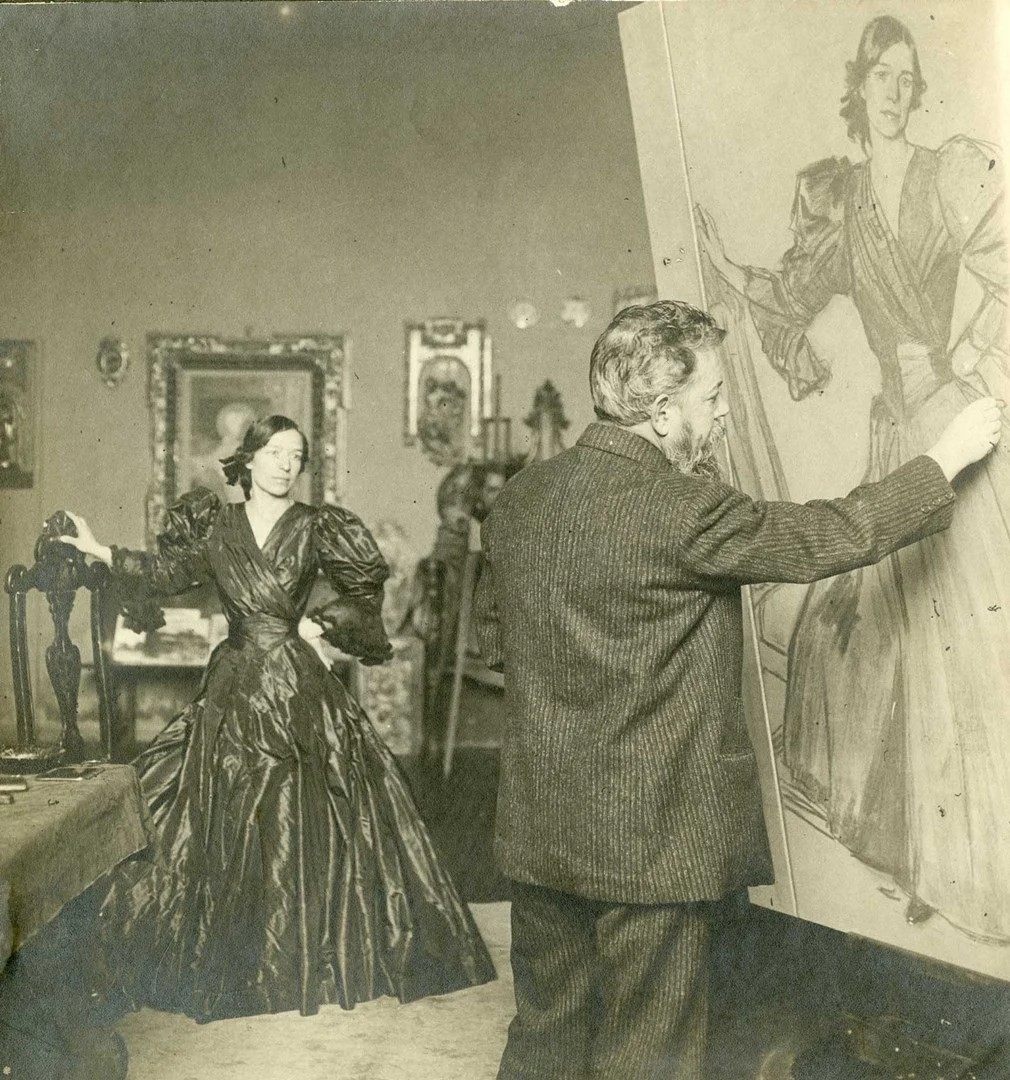
Sorolla painting Señora de Sorolla in Black in 1905, photographed by Christian Franzen

Sorolla's influence on some other Spanish painters, such as Alberto Pla y Rubio and Julio Romero de Torres, was so noted that they are described as "sorollista." After his death, Sorolla's widow, Clotilde García del Castillo, left many of his paintings to the Spanish public. The paintings eventually formed the collection that is now known as the Museo Sorolla, which was the artist's house in Madrid. The museum opened in 1932.

Sorolla's work is represented in museums throughout Spain, Europe, America, and in many private collections in Europe and America. In 1933, J. Paul Getty purchased ten Impressionist beach scenes made by Sorolla, several of which are now housed in the J. Paul Getty Museum. In 1960, Sorolla, el pintor de la luz, a short documentary written and directed by Manuel Domínguez was presented at the Cannes Film Festival. A museum celebrating Sorolla's work is scheduled to open in Valencia's Palau de les Comunicacions in 2026.

The Spanish National Dance Company honored the painter's The Provinces of Spain by producing a ballet Sorolla based on the paintings.

The high-speed railway station in Valencia is named after Sorolla.

=== Temporary exhibitions ===
In 2007 many of his works were exhibited at the Petit Palais in Paris, alongside those of John Singer Sargent, a contemporary who painted in a similarly impressionist-influenced manner. In 2009, there was a special exhibition of his works at the Prado in Madrid, and in 2010, the exhibition visited the Oscar Niemeyer Museum in Curitiba, Brazil.

From 5 December 2011 to 10 March 2012, several of Sorolla's works were exhibited in Queen Sofía Spanish Institute, in New York. This exhibition included pieces used during Sorolla's eight-year research for Vision of Spain.

An exhibition titled Sorolla & America explored Sorolla's unique relationship with the United States in the early twentieth century. The exhibition opened at the Meadows Museum at SMU in Dallas (13 December 2013 – 19 April 2014). From there it traveled to the San Diego Museum of Art (30 May – 26 August 2014) and then to Fundación MAPFRE in Madrid (23 September 2014 – 11 January 2015).

In 2016 the Munich Kunsthalle held a major Sorolla exhibition.

In 2019 the National Gallery, London, held a major temporary Sorolla exhibition, titled Sorolla: Spanish Master of Light.

In 2022 the Royal Palace of Milan held a major temporary Sorolla exhibition, titled Joaquin Sorolla: Pittore di luce (painter of light).

== Gallery ==
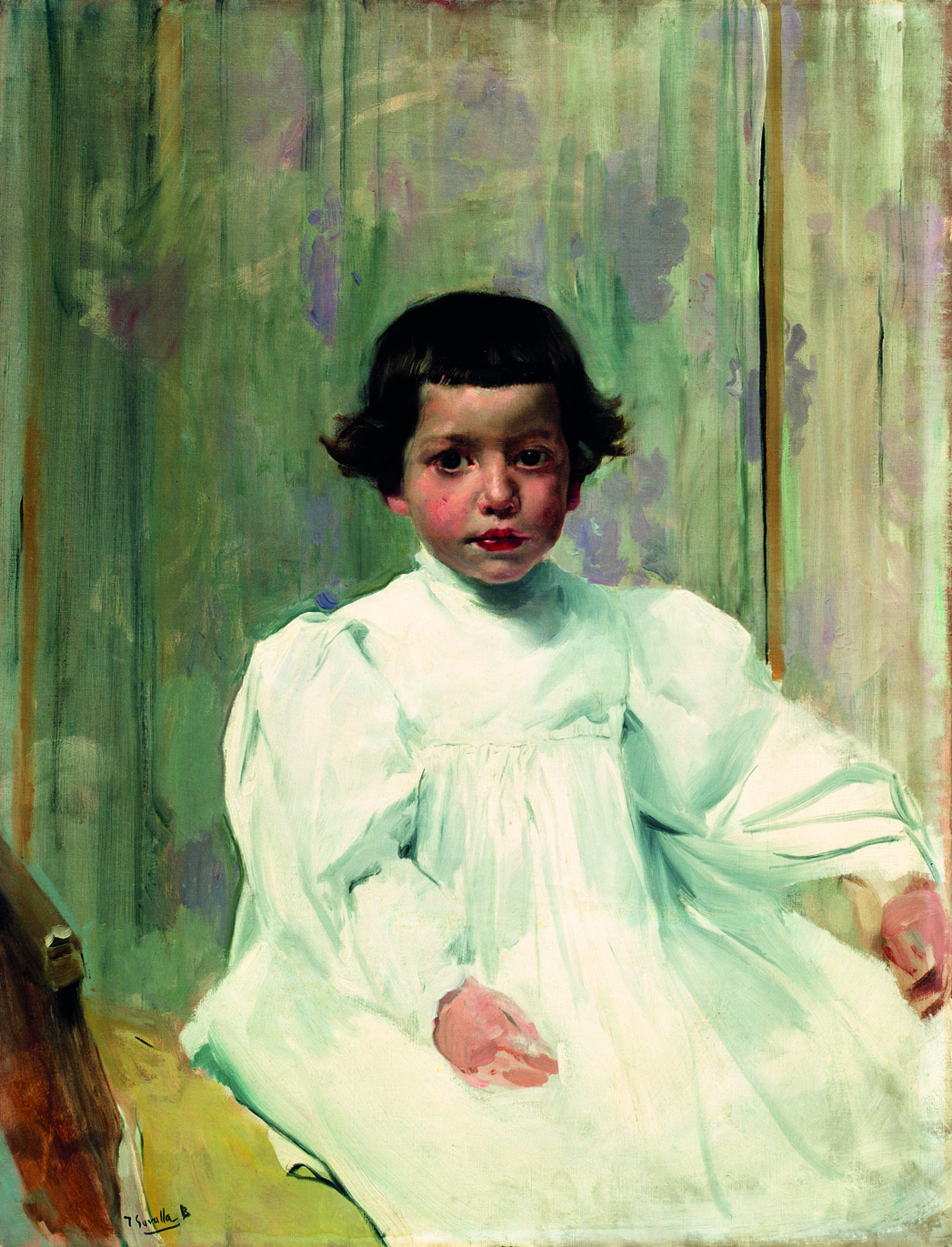
Joaquín Sorolla García vestido de blanco, 1896. Sorolla Museum, Madrid.
The painter's son, "dressed in white".

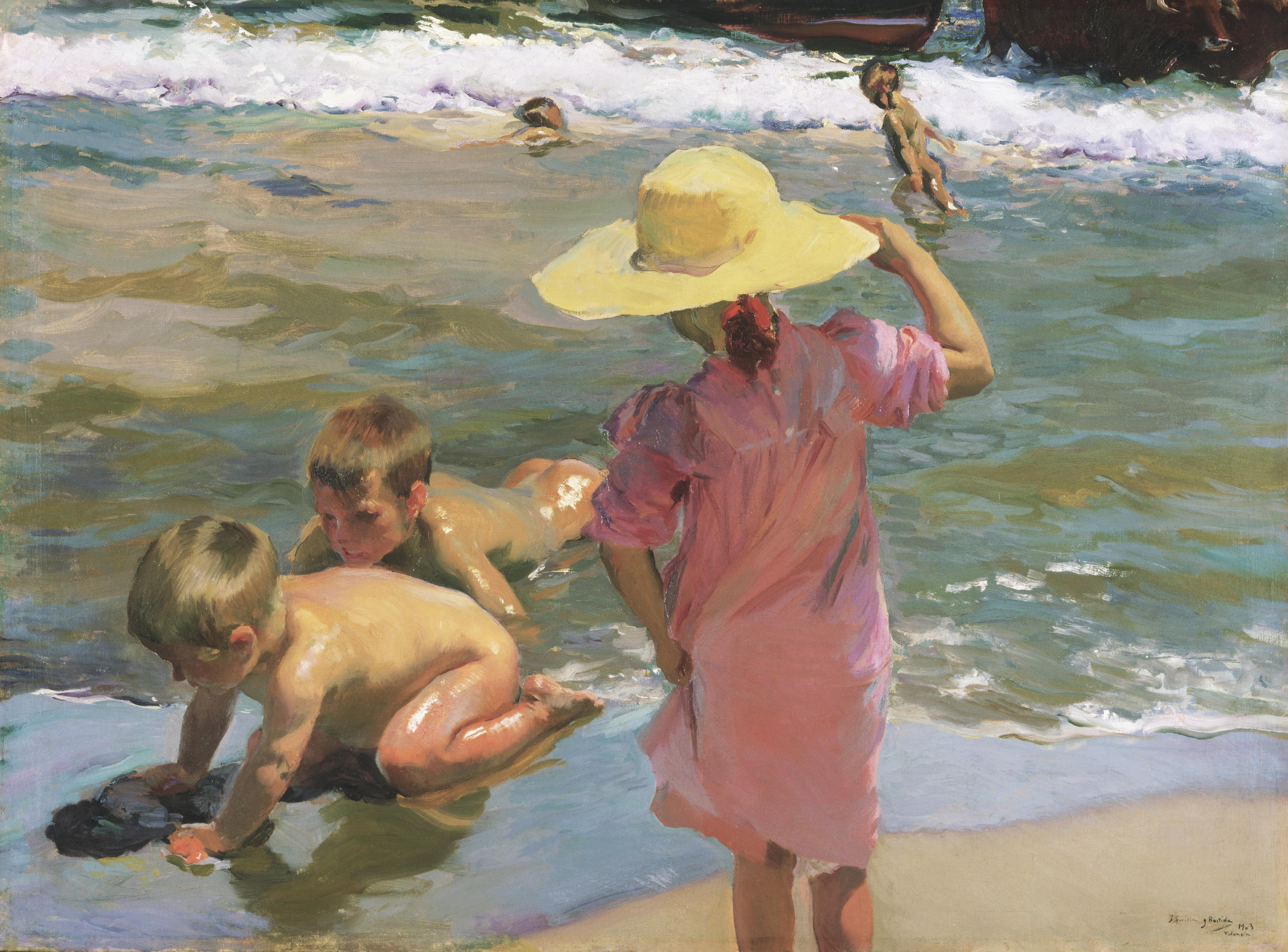
Children on the Seashore, 1903. In the upper right corner, Sorolla has included an oblique reference to another favorite theme, oxen pulling fishing boats in to shore. Philadelphia Museum of Art.

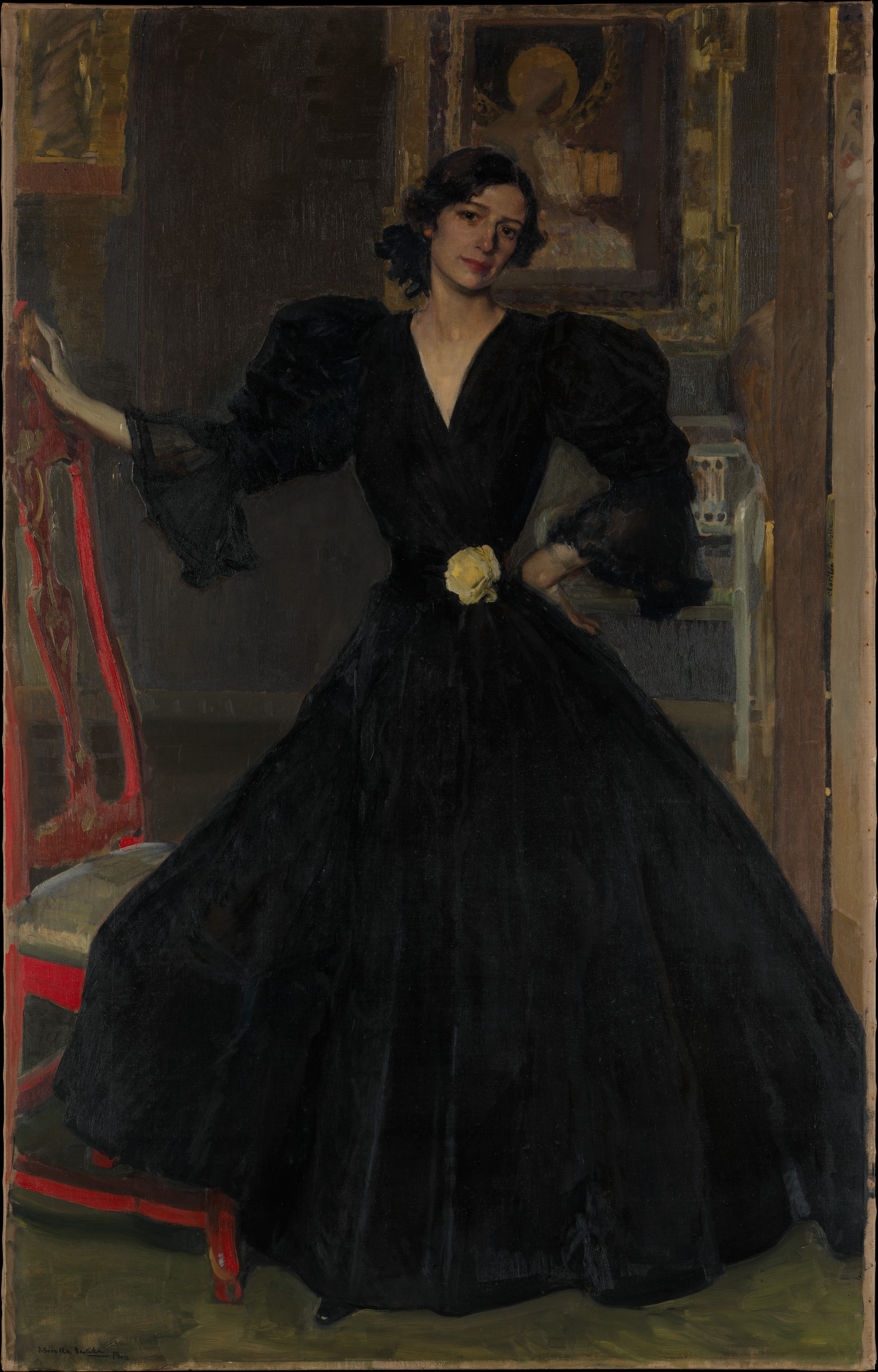
Señora de Sorolla in Black, 1906, Metropolitan Museum of Art.

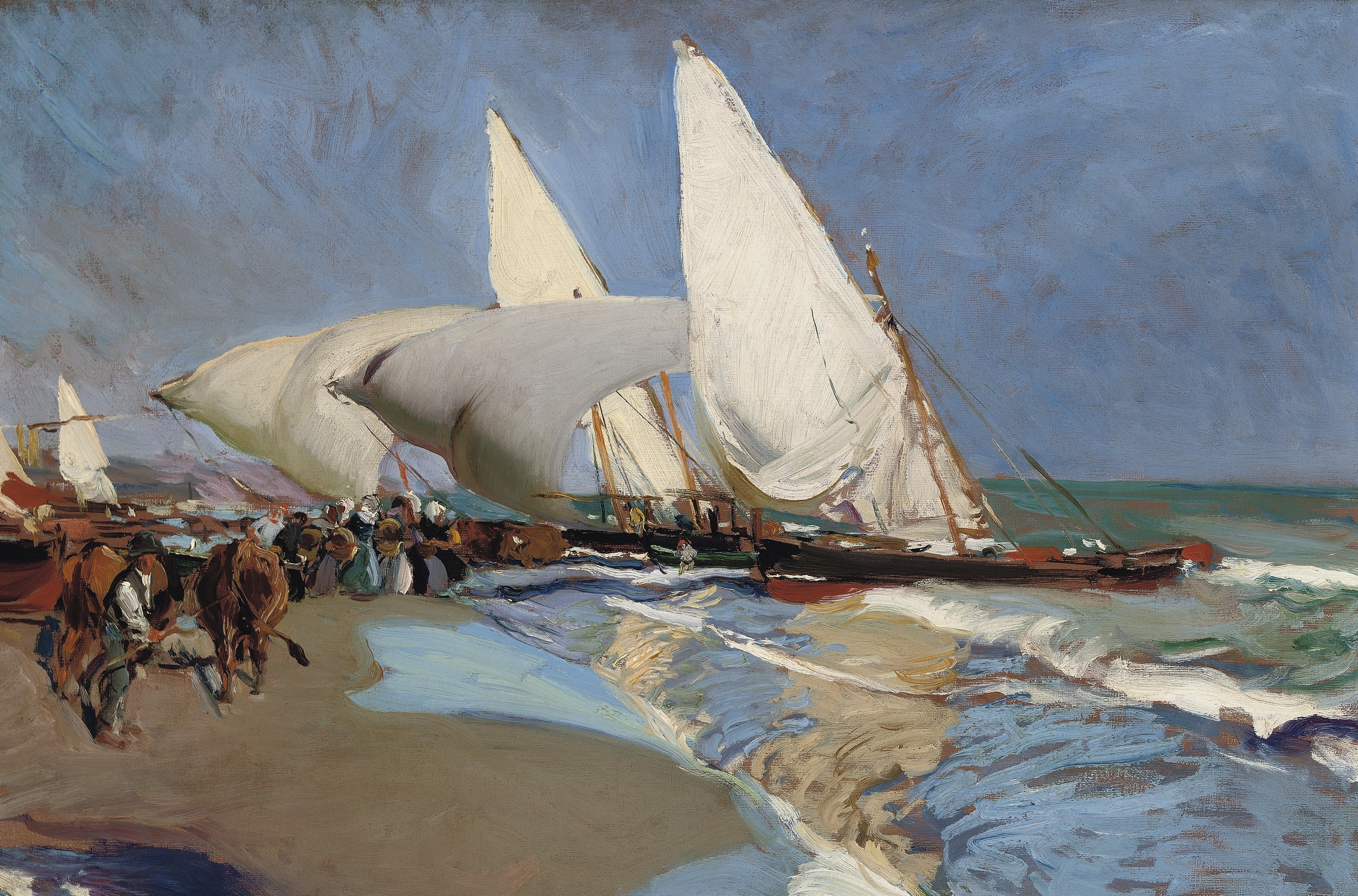
Beach at Valencia, 1908.

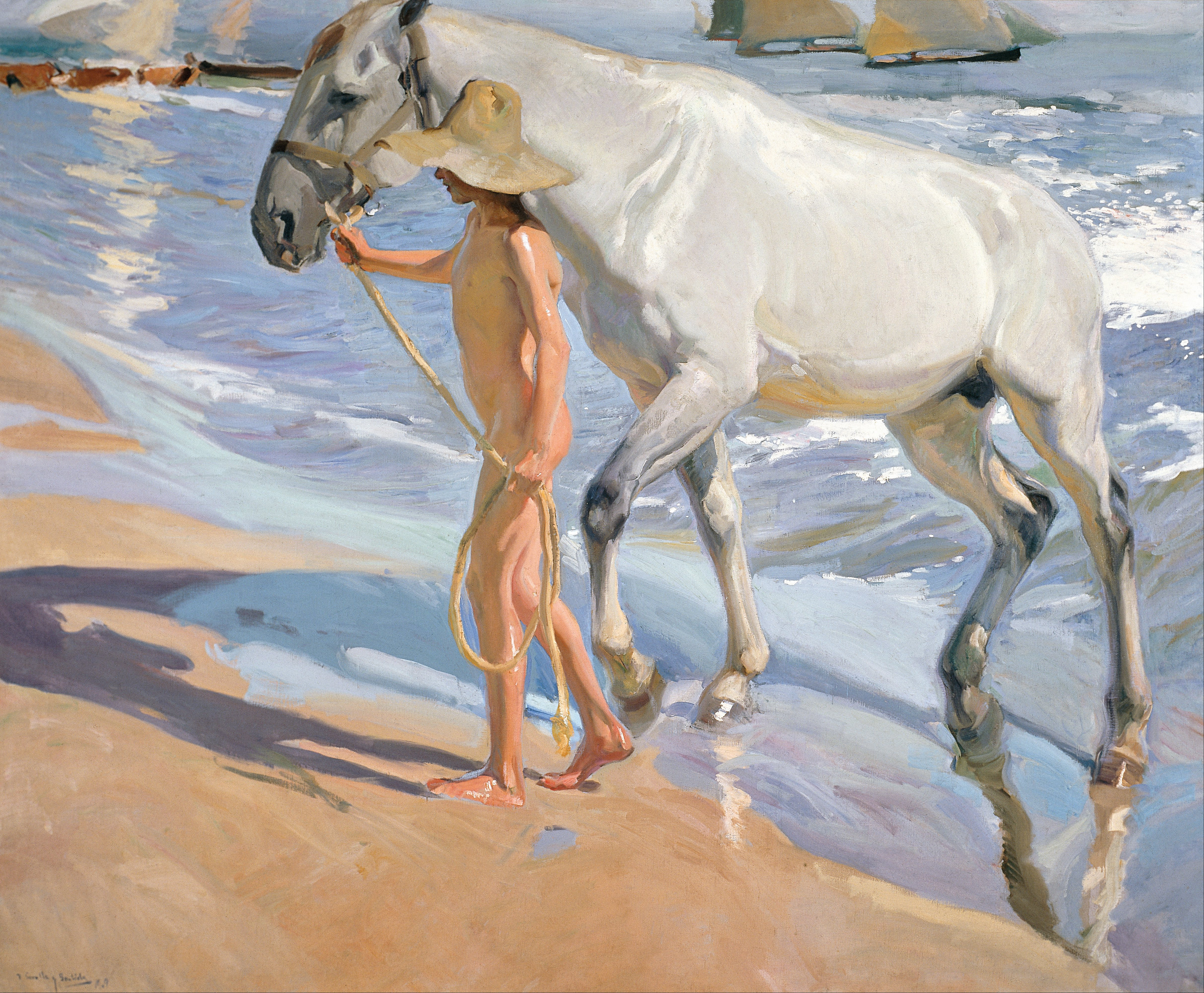
The Horse’s Bath, 1909. Sorolla Museum, Madrid.

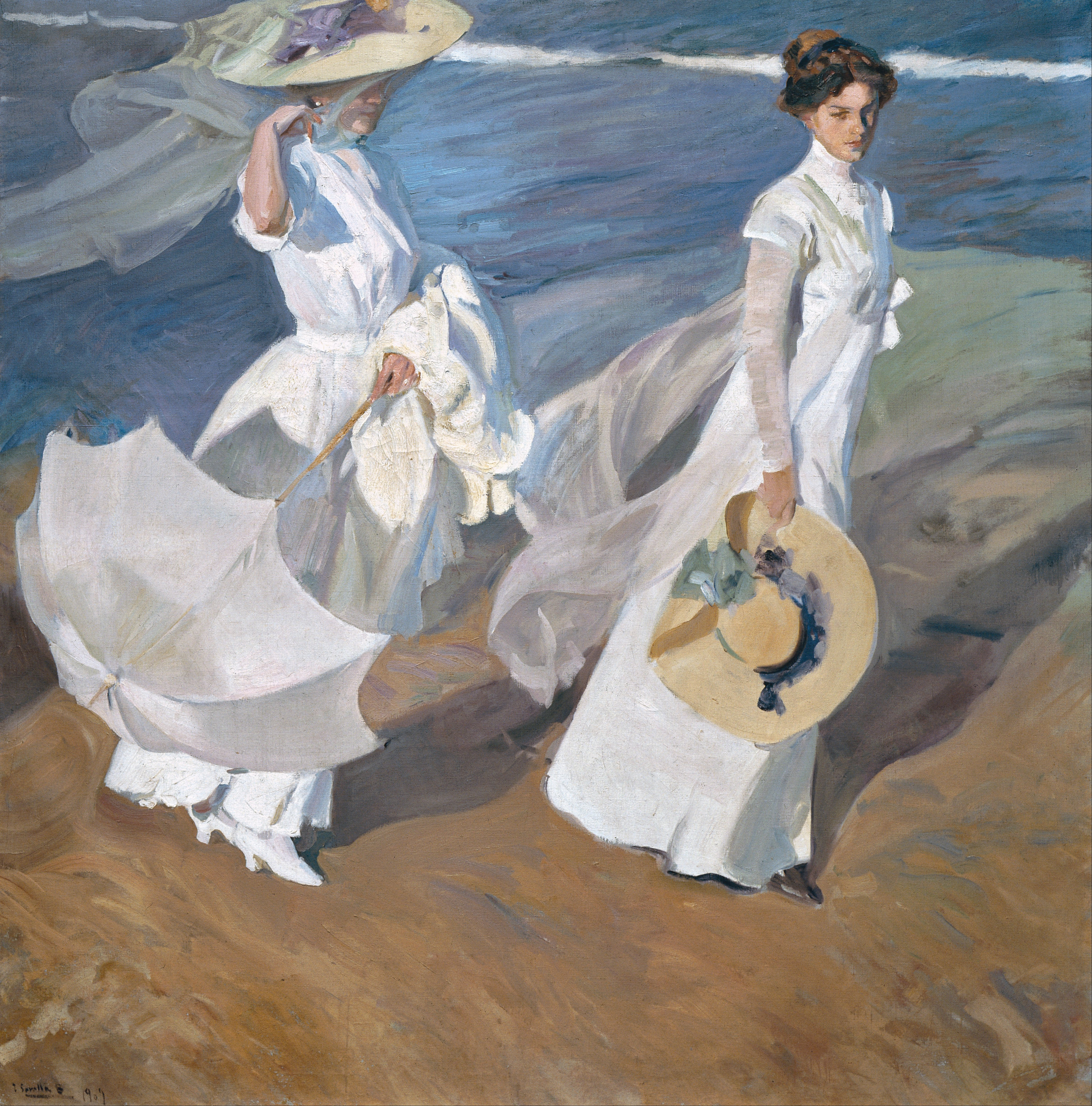
Walk on the Beach or Paseo a orillas del mar, 1909. Sorolla Museum, Madrid.

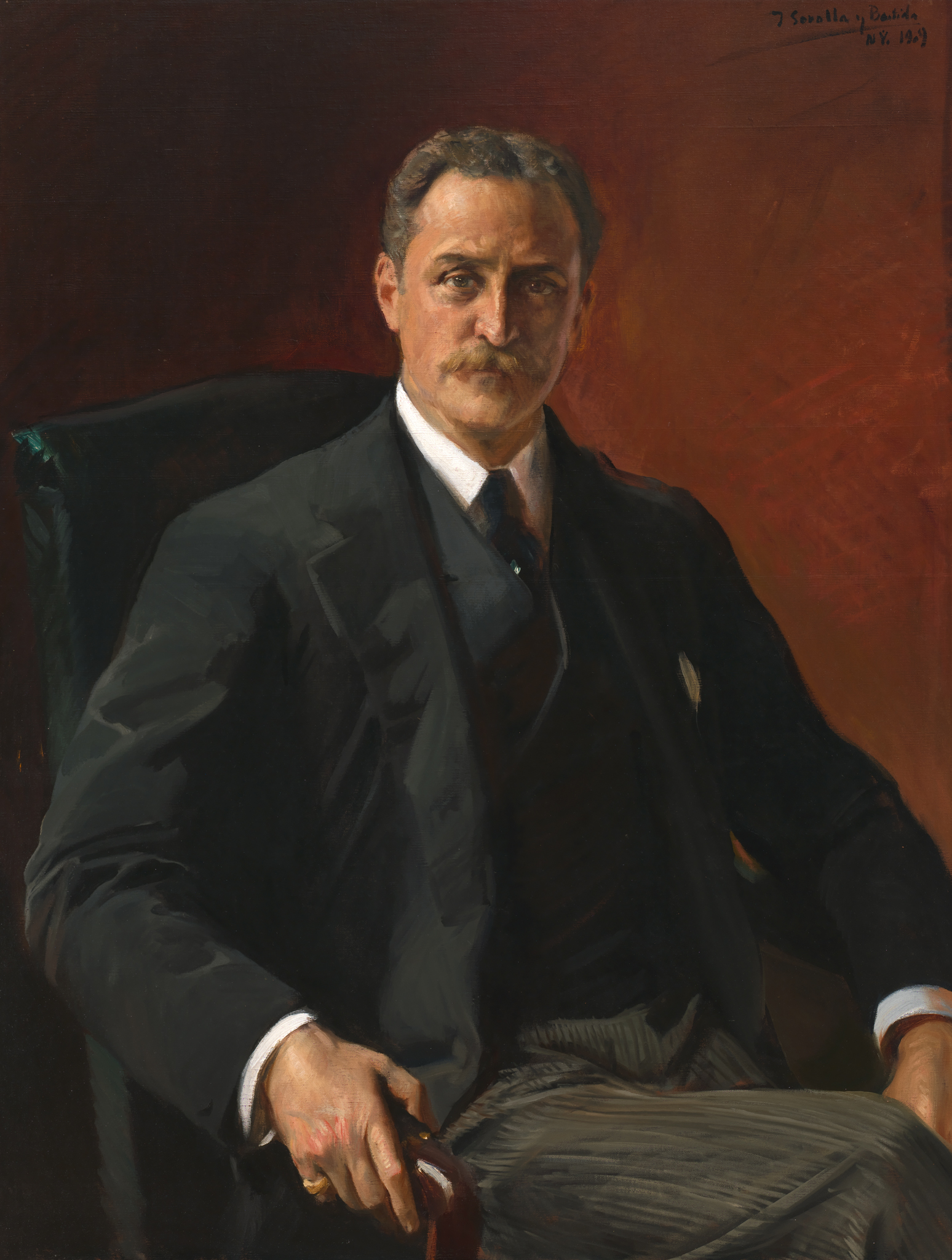
Robert Bacon, 1909 (Diplomatic Reception Rooms, U.S. Department of State).

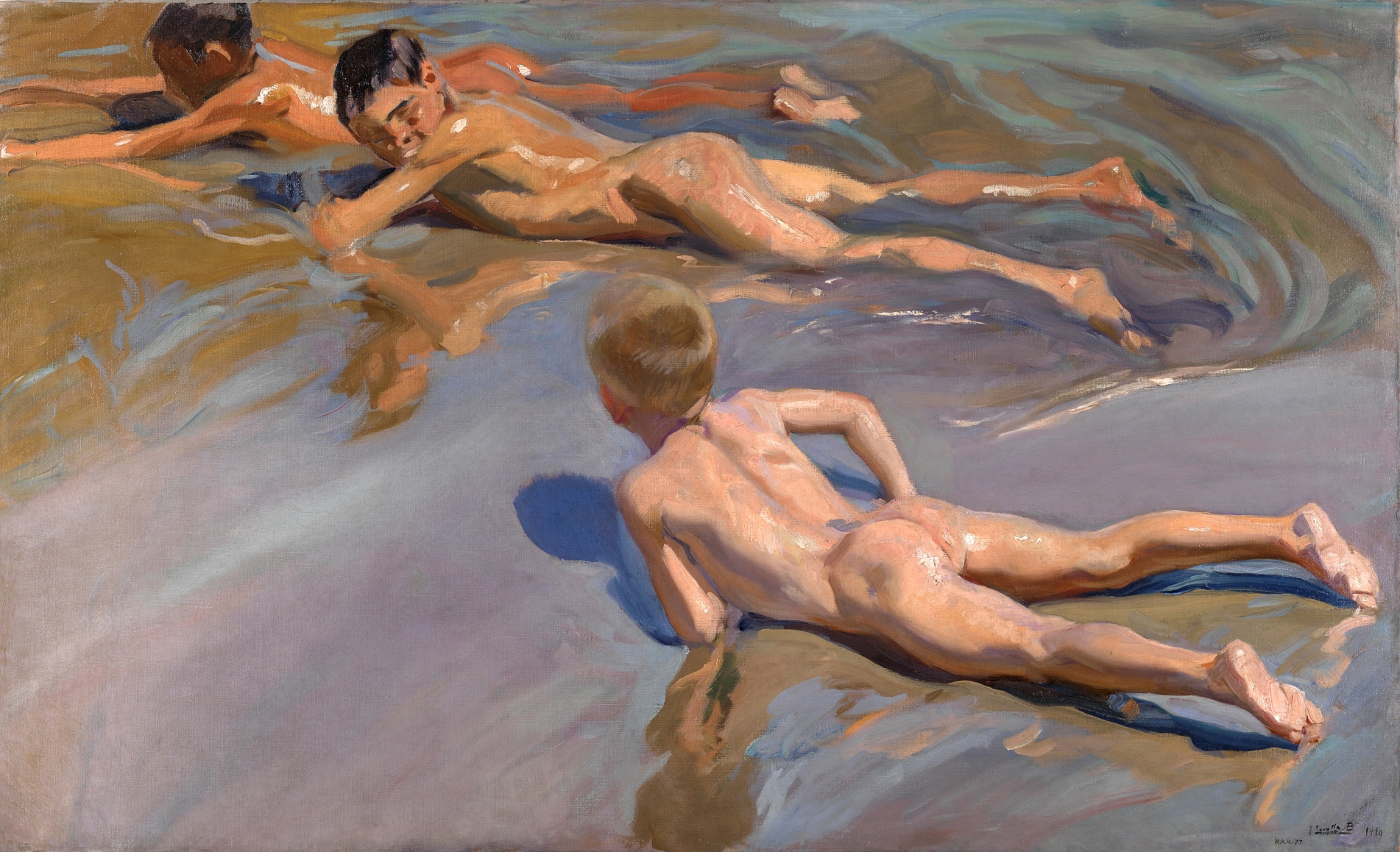
Children on the beach, 1910. Museo del Prado, Madrid.

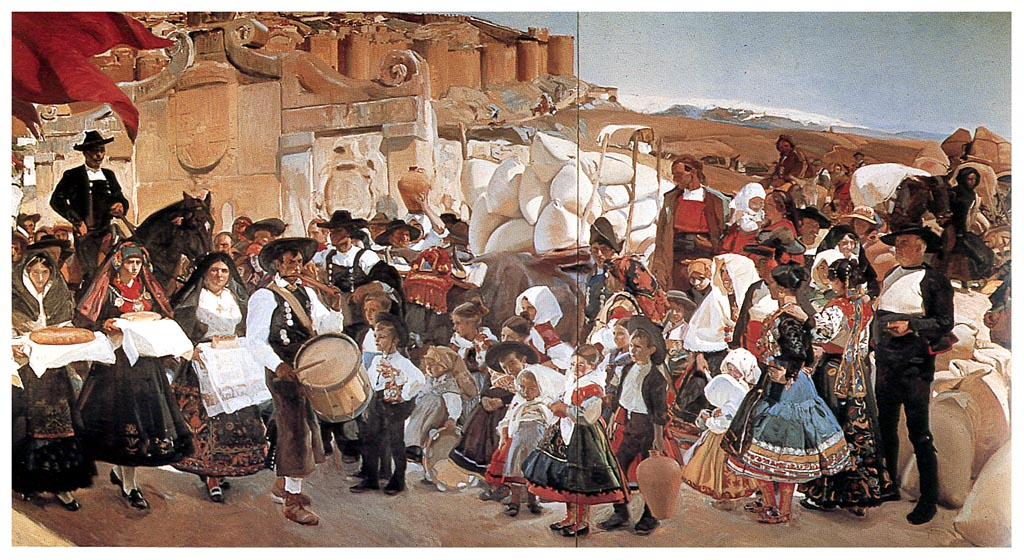
Castilla or La fiesta del pan, 1913. First to be completed of Vision of Spain, 14 murals at the Hispanic Society in Manhattan.

Mother, 1895. Sorolla Museum, Madrid.

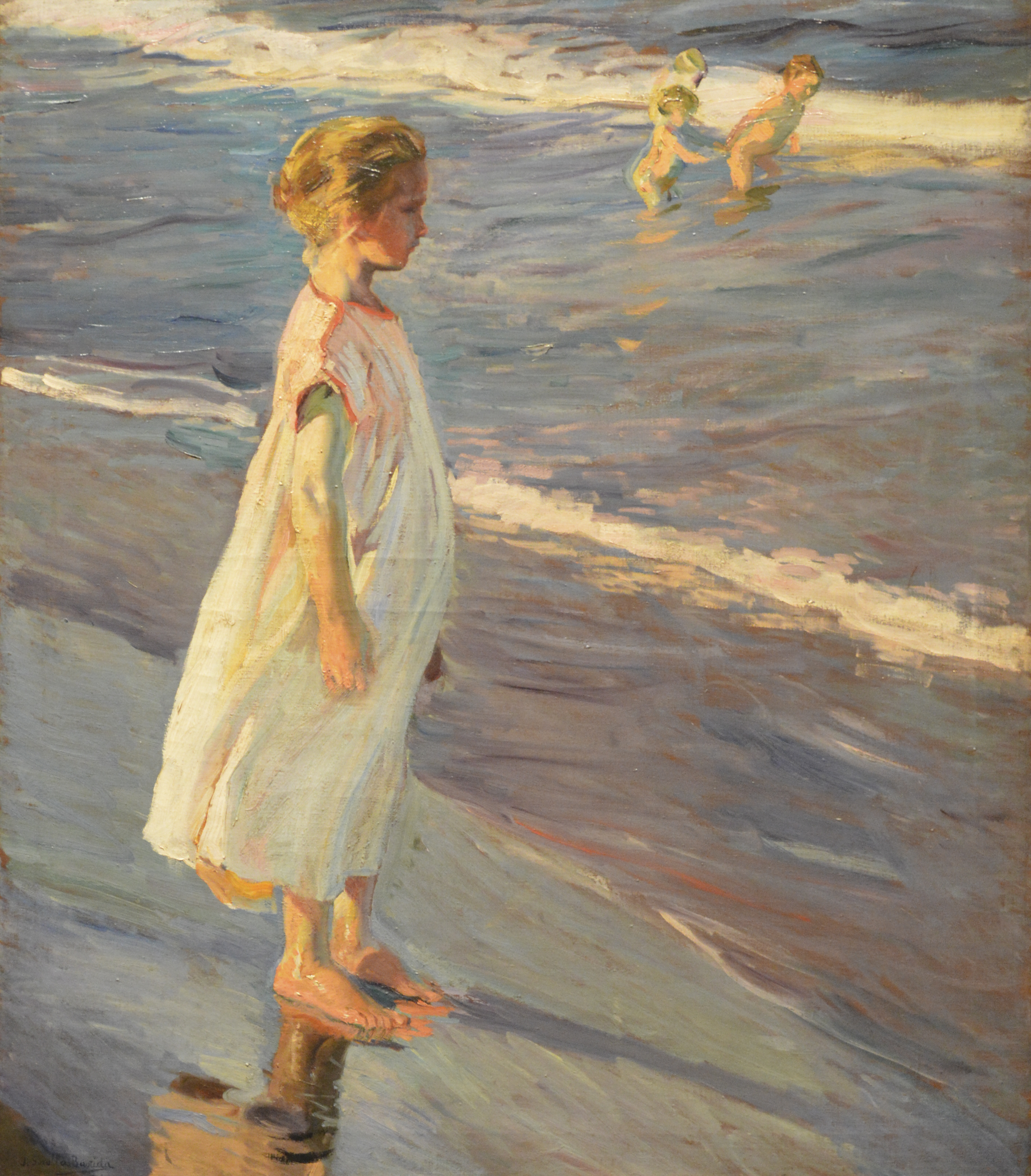
Niña, 1904. Museo Nacional de la Habana, Cuba.
