= American Academy of Arts and Letters Gold Medals =

American art award

Two American Academy of Arts and Letters Gold Medals are awarded each year by the academy for distinguished achievement. The two awards are taken in rotation from these categories:

- Belles Lettres and Criticism, and Painting;
- Biography and Music;
- Fiction and Sculpture;
- History and Architecture, including Landscape Architecture;
- Poetry and Music;
- Drama and Graphic Art.

The Academy voted in 1915 to establish an additional Gold Medal for "special distinction" to be given for the entire work of the recipient who is not a member of the academy. The first of these occasional lifetime achievement gold medals was awarded in the next year to former Harvard President, Charles Eliot.

Awards in individual categories are listed below (in alphabetical order) followed by a list of all prizes in reverse chronological order:Source:

== Architecture ==
Source: American Academy of Arts and Letters

- 1912 – William Rutherford Mead
- 1921 – Cass Gilbert
- 1930 – Charles Adams Platt
- 1940 – William Adams Delano
- 1949 – Frederick Law Olmsted
- 1953 – Frank Lloyd Wright
- 1958 – Henry R. Shepley
- 1963 – Ludwig Mies van der Rohe
- 1968 – R. Buckminster Fuller
- 1973 – Louis I. Kahn
- 1979 – I. M. Pei
- 1984 – Gordon Bunshaft
- 1990 – Kevin Roche
- 1996 – Philip Johnson
- 2002 – Frank O. Gehry
- 2008 – Richard Meier
- 2014 – Henry N. Cobb
- 2020 – Peter Eisenman

== Belles lettres, criticism, essays ==
Source: American Academy of Arts and Letters

- 1916 – John Burroughs
- 1925 – William Crary Brownell
- 1935 – Agnes Repplier
- 1946 – Van Wyck Brooks
- 1950 – H. L. Mencken
- 1955 – Edmund Wilson
- 1960 – E. B. White
- 1965 – Walter Lippmann
- 1970 – Lewis Mumford
- 1975 – Kenneth Burke
- 1981 – Malcolm Cowley
- 1987 – Jacques Barzun
- 1993 – Elizabeth Hardwick
- 1999 – Harold Bloom
- 2005 – Joan Didion
- 2011 – Eric Bentley
- 2017 – Janet Malcolm
- 2023 – Helen Hennessy Vendler

== Biography ==
Source: American Academy of Arts and Letters

- 1976 – Leon Edel
- 1982 – Francis Steegmuller
- 1988 – James Thomas Flexner
- 1994 – Walter Jackson Bate
- 2000 – R. W. B. Lewis
- 2006 – Robert Caro
- 2012 – David McCullough
- 2018 – Ron Chernow
- 2024 – Doris Kearns Goodwin

== Drama ==
Source: American Academy of Arts and Letters

- 1913 – Augustus Thomas
- 1922 – Eugene O'Neill
- 1931 – William Gillette
- 1941 – Robert E. Sherwood
- 1954 – Maxwell Anderson
- 1959 – Arthur Miller
- 1964 – Lillian Hellman
- 1969 – Tennessee Williams
- 1980 – Edward Albee
- 1986 – Sidney Kingsley
- 1992 – Sam Shepard
- 1998 – Horton Foote
- 2004 – John Guare
- 2010 – Romulus Linney
- 2016 – Wallace Shawn
- 2022 – Adrienne Kennedy

== Fiction, novel, short story ==
Source: American Academy of Arts and Letters

- 1915 – Charles William Eliot
- 1915 – William Dean Howells
- 1929 – Edith Wharton
- 1933 – Booth Tarkington
- 1944 – Willa Cather
- 1952 – Thornton Wilder
- 1957 – John Dos Passos
- 1962 – William Faulkner
- 1967 – Katherine Anne Porter
- 1972 – Eudora Welty
- 1977 – Saul Bellow
- 1978 – Peter Taylor
- 1983 – Bernard Malamud
- 1989 – Isaac Bashevis Singer
- 1995 – William Maxwell
- 2001 – Philip Roth
- 2007 – John Updike
- 2013 – E. L. Doctorow
- 2019 – Toni Morrison
- 2025 – Don DeLillo

== Graphic art ==
Source: American Academy of Arts and Letters

- 1954 – Reginald Marsh
- 1959 – George Grosz
- 1964 – Ben Shahn
- 1969 – Leonard Baskin
- 1974 – Saul Steinberg
- 1980 – Peggy Bacon
- 1986 – Jasper Johns
- 1992 – David Levine
- 1998 – Frank Stella
- 2004 – Chuck Close
- 2010 – Ed Ruscha
- 2016 – Vija Celmins
- 2022 – Kara Walker

== History ==
Source: American Academy of Arts and Letters

- 1910 – James Ford Rhodes
- 1918 – William Roscoe Thayer
- 1927 – William M. Sloane
- 1937 – Charles M. Andrews
- 1948 – Charles Austin Beard
- 1952 – Carl Sandburg
- 1957 – Allan Nevins
- 1962 – Samuel Eliot Morison
- 1967 – Arthur Schlesinger, Jr.
- 1972 – Henry Steele Commager
- 1978 – Barbara W. Tuchman
- 1984 – George F. Kennan
- 1990 – C. Vann Woodward
- 1996 – Peter Gay
- 2002 – John Hope Franklin
- 2008 – Edmund S. Morgan
- 2014 – Natalie Zemon Davis
- 2020 – David W. Blight

== Music ==
- 1919 – Charles Martin Loeffler
- 1928 – George W. Chadwick
- 1938 – Walter Damrosch
- 1942 – Ernest Bloch
- 1947 – John Alden Carpenter
- 1951 – Igor Stravinsky
- 1956 – Aaron Copland
- 1961 – Roger Sessions
- 1966 – Virgil Thomson
- 1971 – Elliott Carter
- 1976 – Samuel Barber
- 1982 – William Schuman
- 1985 – Leonard Bernstein
- 1988 – Milton Babbitt
- 1991 – David Diamond
- 1994 – Hugo Weisgall
- 1997 – Gunther Schuller
- 2000 – Lukas Foss
- 2003 – Ned Rorem
- 2006 – Stephen Sondheim
- 2009 – Leon Kirchner
- 2012 – Steve Reich
- 2015 – George Crumb
- 2018 – John Adams
- 2021 – Yehudi Wyner
- 2024 – Laurie Anderson

== Painting ==
- 1914 – John Singer Sargent
- 1923 – Edwin Howland Blashfield
- 1932 – Gari Melchers
- 1942 – Cecilia Beaux
- 1950 – John Sloan
- 1955 – Edward Hopper
- 1960 – Charles E. Burchfield
- 1965 – Andrew Wyeth
- 1970 – Georgia O'Keeffe
- 1975 – Willem de Kooning
- 1981 – Raphael Soyer
- 1987 – Isabel Bishop
- 1993 – Richard Diebenkorn
- 1999 – Robert Rauschenberg
- 2005 – Jane Freilicher
- 2011 – Cy Twombly
- 2017 – Wayne Thiebaud
- 2023 – Faith Ringgold

== Poetry ==
- 1911 – James Whitcomb Riley
- 1929 – Edwin Arlington Robinson
- 1939 – Robert Frost
- 1953 – Marianne Moore
- 1958 – Conrad Aiken
- 1963 – William Carlos Williams
- 1968 – W. H. Auden
- 1973 – John Crowe Ransom
- 1979 – Archibald MacLeish
- 1985 – Robert Penn Warren
- 1991 – Richard Wilbur
- 1997 – John Ashbery
- 2003 – W. S. Merwin
- 2009 – Mark Strand
- 2015 – Louise Gluck
- 2021 – Rita Dove

== Sculpture ==
- 1909 – Augustus Saint-Gaudens
- 1917 – Daniel Chester French
- 1926 – Herbert Adams
- 1930 – Anna Hyatt Huntington
- 1936 – George Grey Barnard
- 1945 – Paul Manship
- 1951 – James Earle Fraser
- 1956 – Ivan Meštrović
- 1961 – William Zorach
- 1966 – Jacques Lipchitz
- 1971 – Alexander Calder
- 1977 – Isamu Noguchi
- 1983 – Louise Nevelson
- 1989 – Louise Bourgeois
- 1995 – George Rickey
- 2001 – Richard Serra
- 2007 – Martin Puryear
- 2013 – Mark di Suvero
- 2019 – Lee Bontecou

== All winners ==
Source: American Academy of Arts and Letters List of Awards

- 1909 – Augustus Saint-Gaudens, Sculpture
- 1910 – James Ford Rhodes, History
- 1911 – James Whitcomb Riley, Poetry
- 1912 – William Rutherford Mead, Architecture
- 1913 – Augustus Thomas, Drama
- 1914 – John Singer Sargent, Painting
- 1915 – William Dean Howells, Fiction
- 1916 – Charles William Eliot, Fiction
- 1916 – John Burroughs, Belles Lettres
- 1917 – Daniel Chester French, Sculpture
- 1918 – William Roscoe Thayer, History
- 1919 – Charles Martin Loeffler, Music
- 1921 – Cass Gilbert, Architecture
- 1922 – Eugene O'Neill, Drama
- 1923 – Edwin Howland Blashfield, Painting
- 1924 – Edith Wharton, Fiction
- 1925 – William Crary Brownell, Belles Lettres
- 1926 – Herbert Adams, Sculpture
- 1927 – William M. Sloane, History
- 1928 – George W. Chadwick, Music
- 1929 – Edwin Arlington Robinson, Poetry
- 1930 – Anna Hyatt Huntington, Sculpture
- 1930 – Charles Adams Platt, Architecture
- 1931 – William Gillette, Drama
- 1932 – Gari Melchers, Painting
- 1933 – Booth Tarkington, Fiction
- 1935 – Agnes Repplier, Belles Lettres
- 1936 – George Grey Barnard, Sculpture
- 1937 – Charles M. Andrews, History
- 1938 – Walter Damrosch, Music
- 1939 – Robert Frost, Poetry
- 1940 – William Adams Delano, Architecture
- 1941 – Robert E. Sherwood, Drama
- 1942 – Cecilia Beaux, Painting
- 1943 – Stephen Vincent Benét, Literature
- 1944 – Willa Cather, Fiction
- 1945 – Paul Manship, Sculpture
- 1946 – Van Wyck Brooks, Essays
- 1947 – John Alden Carpenter, Music
- 1948 – Charles Austin Beard, History
- 1949 – Frederick Law Olmsted, Architecture
- 1950 – H. L. Mencken, Essays
- 1950 – John Sloan, Painting
- 1951 – Igor Stravinsky, Music
- 1951 – James Earle Fraser, Sculpture
- 1952 – Carl Sandburg, History
- 1952 – Thornton Wilder, Fiction
- 1953 – Frank Lloyd Wright, Architecture
- 1953 – Marianne Moore, Poetry
- 1954 – Maxwell Anderson, Drama
- 1954 – Reginald Marsh, Graphic Art
- 1955 – Edmund Wilson, Essays
- 1955 – Edward Hopper, Painting
- 1956 – Aaron Copland, Music
- 1956 – Ivan Meštrović, Sculpture
- 1957 – Allan Nevins, History
- 1957 – John Dos Passos, Fiction
- 1958 – Conrad Aiken, Poetry
- 1958 – Henry R. Shepley, Architecture
- 1959 – Arthur Miller, Drama
- 1959 – George Grosz, Graphic Art
- 1960 – Charles E. Burchfield, Painting
- 1960 – E. B. White, Essays
- 1961 – Roger H. Sessions, Music
- 1961 – William Zorach, Sculpture
- 1962 – Samuel Eliot Morison, History
- 1962 – William Faulkner, Fiction
- 1963 – Ludwig Mies van der Rohe, Architecture
- 1963 – William Carlos Williams, Poetry
- 1964 – Ben Shahn, Graphic Art
- 1964 – Lillian Hellman, Drama
- 1965 – Walter Lippmann, Essays
- 1965 – Wyeth, Painting
- 1966 – Jacques Lipchitz, Sculpture
- 1966 – Virgil Thomson, Music
- 1967 – Arthur Schlesinger, Jr., History
- 1967 – Katherine Anne Porter, Fiction
- 1968 – R. Buckminster Fuller, Architecture
- 1968 – W. H. Auden, Poetry
- 1969 – Leonard Baskin, Graphic Art
- 1969 – Tennessee Williams, Drama
- 1970 – Georgia O'Keeffe, Painting
- 1970 – Lewis Mumford, Belles Lettres
- 1971 – Alexander Calder, Sculpture
- 1971 – Elliott Carter, Music
- 1972 – Eudora Welty, Novel
- 1972 – Henry Steele Commager, History
- 1973 – John Crowe Ransom, Poetry
- 1973 – Louis I. Kahn, Architecture
- 1974 – Saul Steinberg, Graphic Art
- 1975 – Kenneth Burke, Belles Lettres
- 1975 – Willem de Kooning, Painting
- 1976 – Leon Edel, Biography
- 1976 – Samuel Barber, Music
- 1977 – Isamu Noguchi, Sculpture
- 1977 – Saul Bellow, Novel
- 1978 – Barbara W. Tuchman, History
- 1978 – Peter Taylor, Short Story
- 1979 – Archibald MacLeish, Poetry
- 1979 – I. M. Pei, Architecture
- 1980 – Edward Albee, Drama
- 1980 – Peggy Bacon, Graphic Art
- 1981 – Malcolm Cowley, Belles Lettres
- 1981 – Raphael Soyer, Painting
- 1982 – Francis Steegmuller, Biography
- 1982 – William Schuman, Music
- 1983 – Bernard Malamud, Fiction
- 1983 – Louise Nevelson, Sculpture
- 1984 – George F. Kennan, History
- 1984 – Gordon Bunshaft, Architecture
- 1985 – Leonard Bernstein, Music
- 1985 – Robert Penn Warren, Poetry
- 1986 – Jasper Johns, Graphic Art
- 1986 – Sidney Kingsley, Drama
- 1987 – Isabel Bishop, Painting
- 1987 – Jacques Barzun, Belles Lettres
- 1988 – James Thomas Flexner, Biography
- 1988 – Milton Babbitt, Music
- 1989 – Isaac Bashevis Singer, Fiction
- 1989 – Louise Bourgeois, Sculpture
- 1990 – C. Vann Woodward, History
- 1991 – David Diamond, Music
- 1991 – Richard Wilbur, Poetry
- 1992 – David Levine, Graphic Art
- 1992 – Sam Shepard, Drama
- 1993 – Elizabeth Hardwick, Belles Lettres/Criticism
- 1993 – Richard Diebenkorn, Painting
- 1994 – Hugo Weisgall, Music
- 1994 – Walter Jackson Bate, Biography
- 1995 – George Rickey, Sculpture
- 1995 – William Maxwell, Fiction
- 1996 – Peter Gay, History
- 1996 – Philip Johnson, Architecture
- 1997 – Gunther Schuller, Music
- 1997 – John Ashbery, Poetry
- 1998 – Frank Stella, Graphic Art
- 1998 – Horton Foote, Drama
- 1999 – Harold Bloom, Belles Lettres
- 1999 – Kevin Roche, Architecture
- 1999 – Robert Rauschenberg, Painting
- 2000 – Lukas Foss, Music
- 2000 – R. W. B. Lewis, Biography
- 2001 – Richard Meier, Graphic Art
- 2001 – Philip Roth, Fiction
- 2001 – Richard Serra, Sculpture
- 2002 – Frank O. Gehry, Architecture
- 2002 – John Hope Franklin, History
- 2003 – Ned Rorem, Music
- 2003 – W. S. Merwin, Poetry
- 2004 – Chuck Close, Graphic Art
- 2004 – John Guare, Drama
- 2005 – Jane Freilicher, Painting
- 2005 – Joan Didion, Belles Lettres and Criticism
- 2006 – Robert Caro, Biography
- 2006 – Stephen Sondheim, Music
- 2007 – John Updike, Fiction
- 2007 – Martin Puryear, Sculpture
- 2008 – Edmund S. Morgan, History
- 2008 – Richard Meier, Architecture
- 2009 – Leon Kirchner, Music
- 2009 – Mark Strand, Poetry
- 2010 – Ed Ruscha, Graphic Art
- 2010 – Romulus Linney, Drama
- 2010 – Toni Morrison, Belles Lettres and Criticism
- 2011 – Cy Twombly, Painting
- 2011 – Eric Bentley, Belles Lettres and Criticism
- 2012 – David McCullough, Biography
- 2012 – Steve Reich, Music
- 2013 – E. L. Doctorow, Fiction
- 2013 – Mark di Suvero, Sculpture
- 2014 – Henry N. Cobb, Architecture
- 2014 – Natalie Zemon Davis, History
- 2015 – George Crumb, Music
- 2015 – Louise Gluck, Poetry
- 2016 – Vija Celmins, Graphic Art
- 2016 – Wallace Shawn, Drama
- 2017 – Janet Malcolm, Belles Lettres and Criticism
- 2017 – Wayne Thiebaud, Painting
- 2018 – Ron Chernow, Biography
- 2018 – John Adams, Music
- 2019 – Lee Bontecou, Sculpture
- 2019 – Toni Morrison, Literature
- 2020 – David W. Blight, Literature
- 2020 – Peter Eisenman, Architecture
- 2021 – Rita Dove, Poetry
- 2021 – Yehudi Wyner, Music
- 2022 – Adrienne Kennedy, Drama
- 2022 – Kara Walker, Graphic art
- 2023 – Helen Hennessy Vendler, Belles Lettres and Criticism
- 2023 – Faith Ringgold, Painting
- 2024 – Laurie Anderson, Music
- 2024 – Doris Kearns Goodwin, Biography

== See also ==
- List of American literary awards
- List of poetry awards
- List of art awards
- American literature
- American poetry
- List of years in poetry
- List of years in literature
- List of years in art
