= Oliver Herford =

American poet

Oliver Herford (2 December 1860 – 5 July 1935) was an Anglo-American writer, artist, and illustrator known for his pithy bon mots and skewed sense of humor.

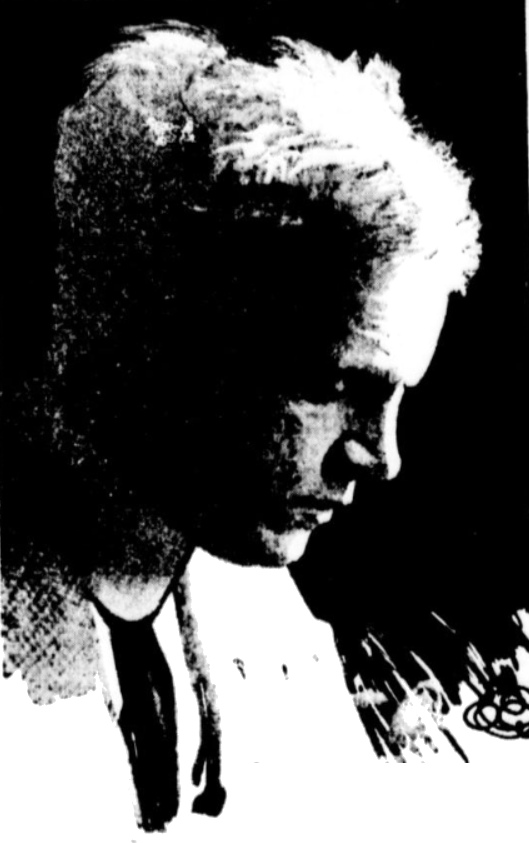
Oliver Herford, c. 1916.

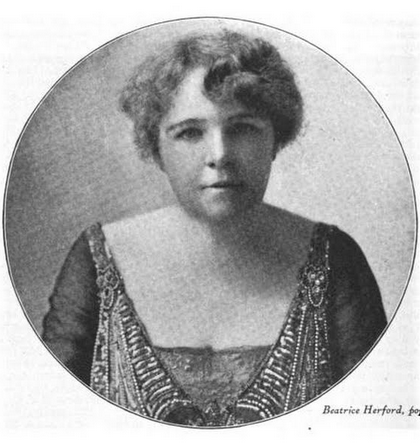
Oliver's sister Beatrice Herford, from a 1921 review by Dorothy Parker.

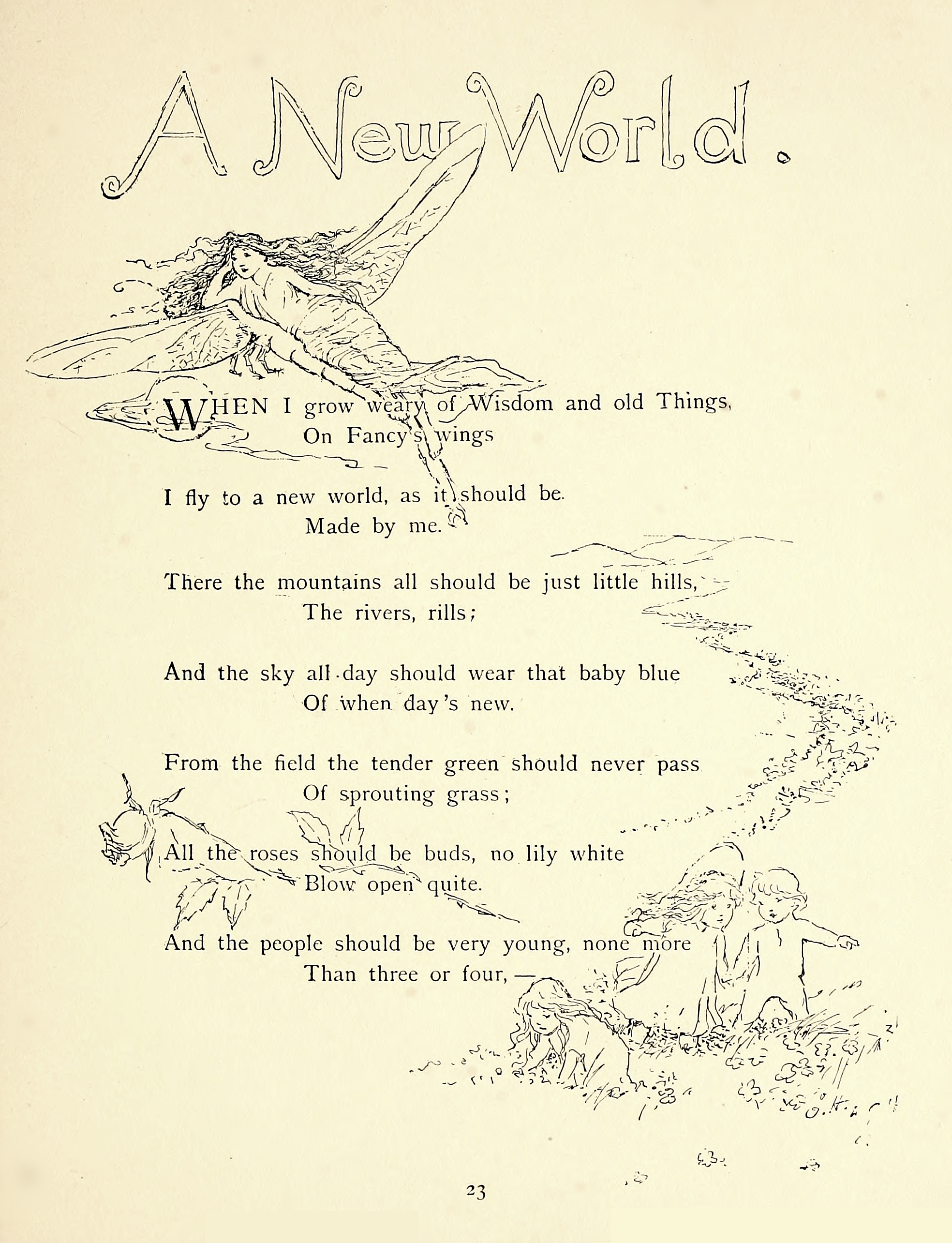
A page from Allegretto by Gertrude Hall, 1892.

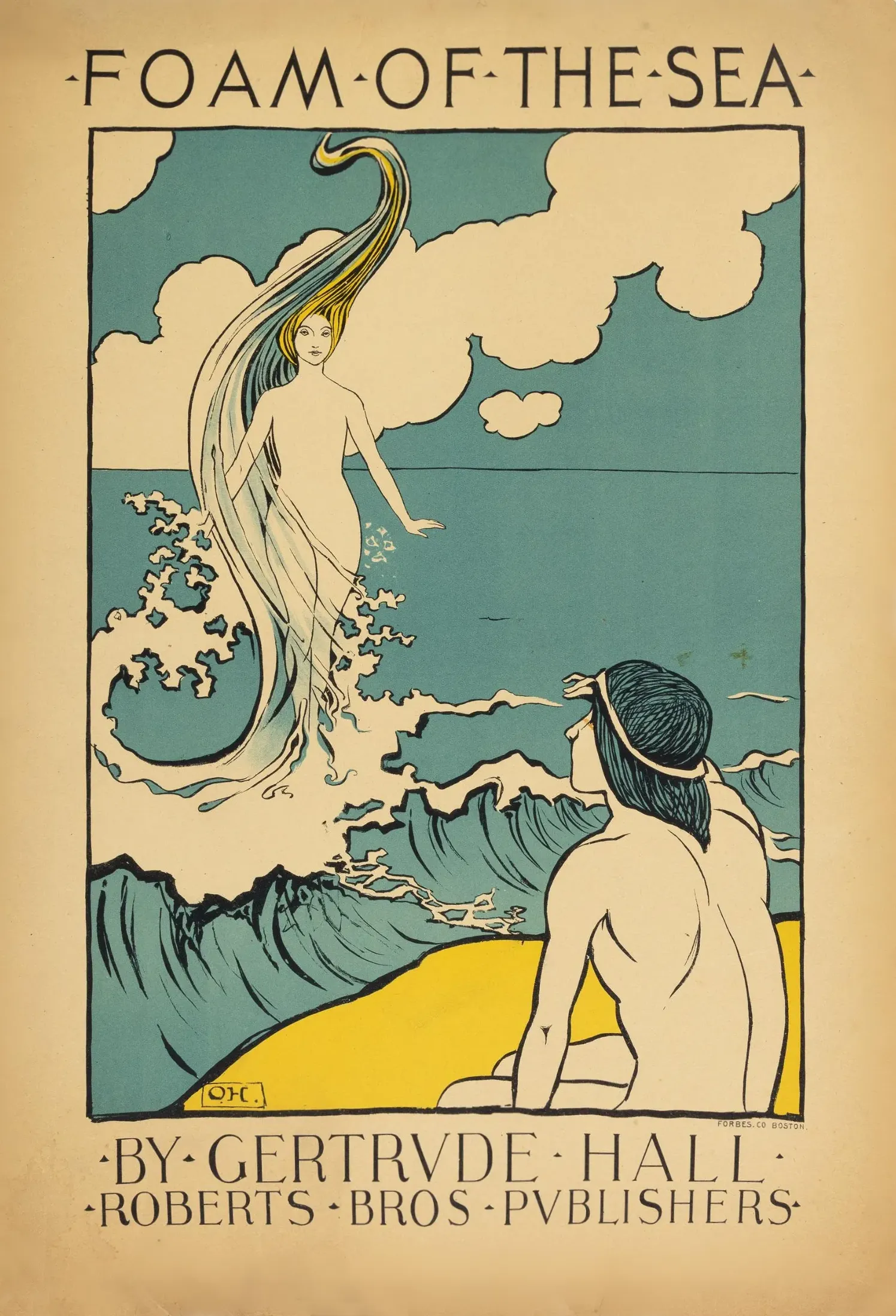
Poster art for Foam of the Sea by Gertrude Hall, 1895.

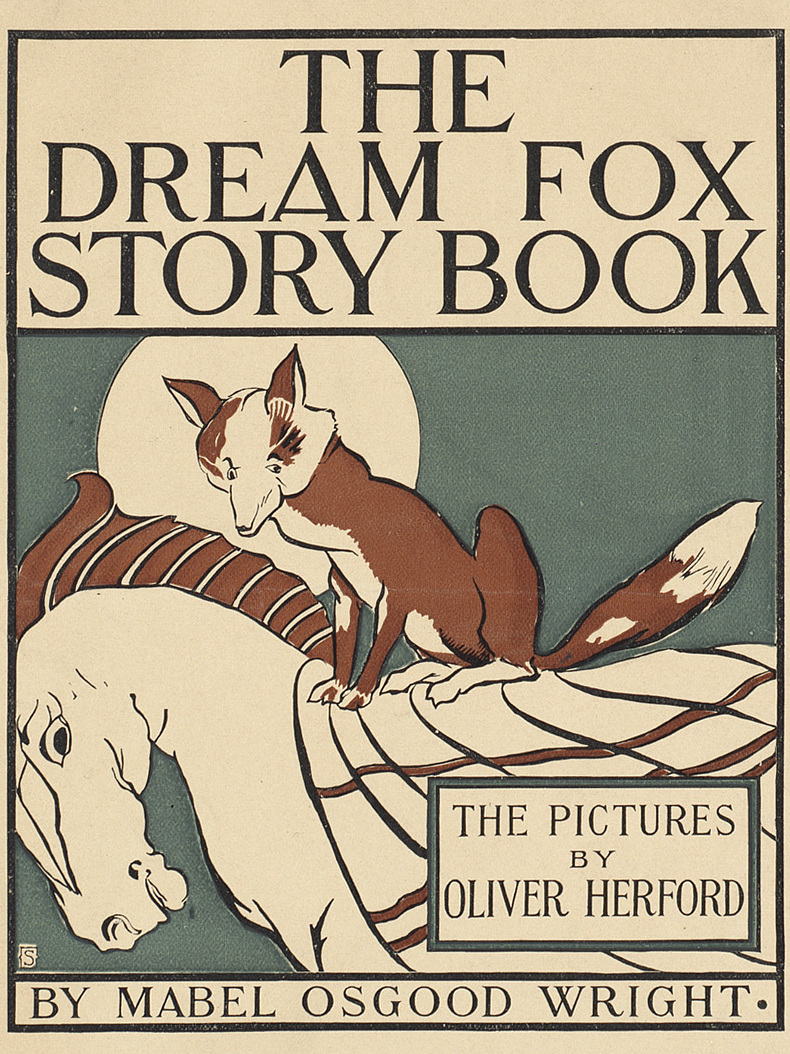
The Dream Fox Story Book, 1900.

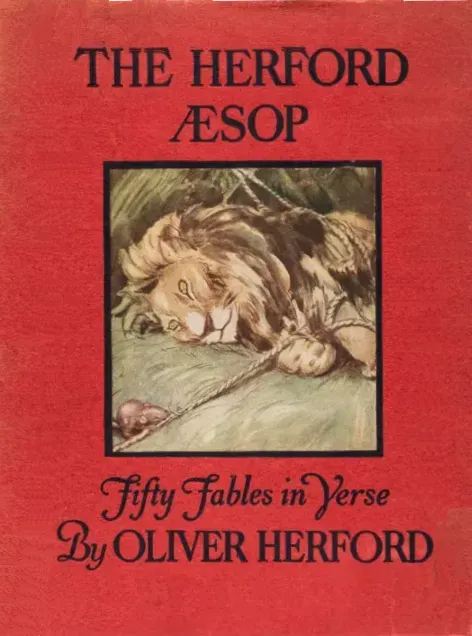
The Herford Aesop: Fifty Fables in Verse, 1921.

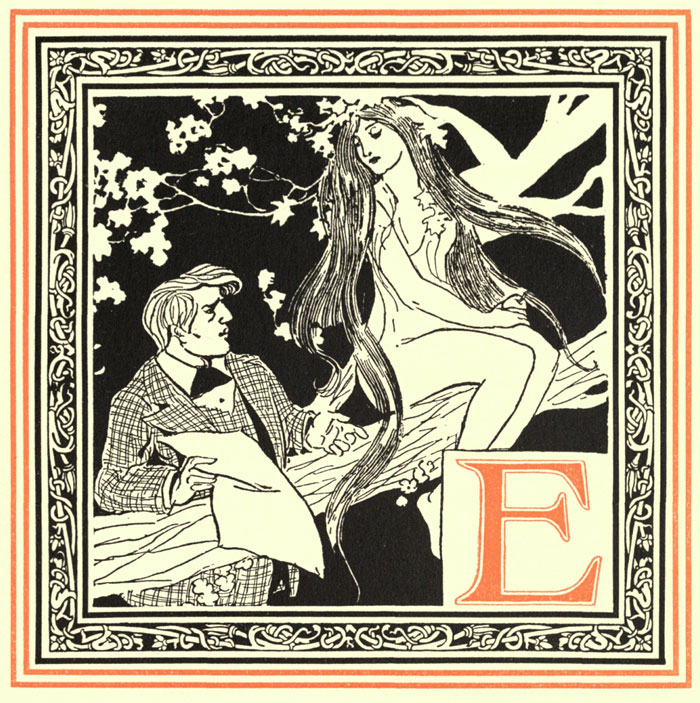
Edison and Eve, from An Alphabet of Celebrities by Oliver Herford, 1921.

He was born in Sheffield, England on 2 December 1860 to Rev. Brooke Herford and Hannah Hankinson Herford. Oliver's father, a Unitarian minister, moved the family to Chicago in 1876 and Boston in 1882. Oliver attended Antioch College in Yellow Springs, Ohio, from 1877 to 1879. Later he studied art at the Slade School in London and the Académie Julian in Paris. Afterward, he moved to New York, where he lived until his death.

"Herford, regarded as the American Oscar Wilde, was known for his wit". His sister Beatrice Herford was also a humorist, delivering comic monologues on stage.

To appeal to Christmas shoppers in 1902, Ethel Mumford and Addison Mizner published a small book, printed in San Francisco, The Cynic's Calendar of Revised Wisdom for 1903, featuring a barbed epigram or aphorism for each week of the year; they added Herford's name as an author, either as a spoof or to take advantage of his burgeoning notoriety, and to everyone's surprise the calendar was an astounding success. When Herford got wind of the story, he demanded 90% of the royalties. He was awarded an equal third, and annual incarnations of the Cynic's Calendar, including contributions from Herford, continued to appear for the rest of the decade and beyond.

Herford's cartoons and humorous verses regularly enlivened publications including Life, Woman's Home Companion, Ladies' Home Journal, Century Magazine, Harper's Weekly, The Masses, The Mentor, and Punch. From the 1890s to the 1930s, Herford authored over 30 books, sometimes written in collaboration with others (notably John Cecil Clay), and usually illustrated by himself. He also illustrated many books by other authors, including Joel Chandler Harris, Carolyn Wells, and Edgar Lee Masters. His 1894 collaboration with Gertrude Hall, Allegretto, was dedicated "To Wolcott Balestier, These Verses anjd Pictures." Balestier died in 1891 at the age of 29.

Herford was a longtime member of the Players Club in New York City, where his wit became "one of the traditions of Gramercy Park." He married Margaret Regan, an Englishwoman, in New York on May 26, 1905. They made their home at 182 East 18th Street for about thirty years. Herford died on July 5, 1935, and his wife died the following December.

From his obituary in The New York Times:

"His wit…was too original at first to go down with the very delectable highly respectable magazine editors of the Nineties. It was odd, unexpected, his brand. It takes a genius to write the best nonsense, which is often far more sensible than sense. Herford's, the result of care and polish, looked unforced.… Intelligent, thoughtful, well-bred, what with his animals and his children and his artistic simplicities, he was remote from the style of the best moderns. No violence, no obscenity, not even obscurity or that long-windedness which is the signet of the illustrious writer of today. An old-fashioned gentleman, a painstaking artist, whose work had edge, grace, and distinction."

== Books ==
By Oliver Herford with drawings by Herford:
- Pen and Inkings (1893).
- Artful Anticks (1897).
- An Alphabet of Celebrities (1899).
- A Child's Primer of Natural History (1899)
- The Bashful Earthquake & Other Fables and Verses (1900).
- Overheard in a Garden Et Cætera (1900).
- McAdam and Eve; or, Two in a Garden; a Musical Fantasy in Three Acts (1900).
- More Animals (1901).
- The Rubáiyát of a Persian Kitten (1904).
- Two in a Zoo, co-authored with Curtis Dunham (1904).
- The Fairy Godmother-in-Law (1905).
- The Peter Pan Alphabet (1907).
- The Astonishing Tale of a Pen & Ink Puppet (1907).
- The Simple Jography, or How to Know the Earth and Why it Spins (1908).
- The Cynic's Calendar of Revised Wisdom for 1903, co-authored with Ethel Watts Mumford and Addison Mizner.
- The Cynic's Calendar of Revised Wisdom for 1904, co-authored with Ethel Watts Mumford and Addison Mizner.
- The Entirely New Cynic's Calendar of Revised Wisdom for 1905, co-authored with Ethel Watts Mumford and Addison Mizner (1905).
- The Complete Cynic's Calendar of Revised Wisdom 1906, co-authored with Ethel Watts Mumford and Addison Mizner (1906).
- The Altogether New Cynic's Calendar of Revised Wisdom for 1907, co-authored with Ethel Watts Mumford and Addison Mizner (1907).
- The Quite New Cynic's Calendar of Revised Wisdom, co-authored with Ethel Watts Mumford and Addison Mizner (1908).
- Cupid's Almanac and Guide to Hearticulture: for This Year and Next, co-authored with John Cecil Clay (1908).
- The Perfectly Good Cynic's Calendar with Astrological Attachment, co-authored with Ethel Watts Mumford and Addison Mizner (1909).
- The Complete Cynic, co-authored with Ethel Watts Mumford and Addison Mizner (1910).
- Cupid's Cyclopedia, co-authored with John Cecil Clay (1910).
- A Kitten's Garden of Verses (1911).
- Cupid's Fair-Weather Booke, co-authored with John Cecil Clay (1911).
- The Mythological Zoo (1912).
- Happy Days, co-authored with John Cecil Clay (1917).
- The Revived Cynic's Calendar, co-authored with Ethel Watts Mumford and Addison Mizner (1917).
- Confessions of a Caricaturist (1917).
- The Laughing Willows (1918).
- This Giddy Globe (1919).
- A Little Book of Bores (1920).
- The Herford Æsop; Fifty Fables in Verse (1921).
- Neither Here Nor There (1922).
- Excuse It, Please (1929).
- Sea Legs (1931).
- The Deb's Dictionary (1931).

Other books by Oliver Herford (without his illustrations):

- The Smoker's Yearbook, the verses written on paper by Oliver Herford & the pictures drawn on stone by Sewell Collins (1908).
- The Devil, by Ferenc Molnar, a play, adapted by Oliver Herford (1908).
- The Bishop's Purse, a novel by Oliver Herford and Cleveland Moffett (1913).
- What'll You Have? a play, by Oliver Herford and Karl Schmidt (1925).

Books by other authors, illustrated by Oliver Herford:

- New Waggings of Old Tales by Two Wags by John Kendrick Bangs and Frank Dempster Sherman (1888).
- The Song of the Sandwich by Ella Wheeler Wilcox (1893).
- Allegretto by Gertrude Hall (1894).
- Overheard in Arcady by Robert Bridges (1894).
- Timothy's Quest: A Story for Anybody, Young or Old Who Cares to Read It by Kate Douglas Wiggin (edition of 1895).
- Little Mr. Thimblefinger Stories by Joel Chandler Harris (1894).
- Mr. Rabbit at Home by Joel Chandler Harris (1895).
- Aaron in the wildwoods by Joel Chandler Harris (1898)
- The Story of Aaron (So Named), the Son of Ben Ali: Told by His Friends and Acquaintances by Joel Chandler Harris (edition of 1900).
- The Dream Fox Story Gook by Mabel Osgood Wright (1900).
- The Bumblepuppy Book by Carolyn Wells (1903).
- Folly for the Wise by Carolyn Wells (1904).
- The Jingle Book by Carolyn Wells (1906).
- Side Show Studies by Francis Metcalfe (1906).
- Gambolling with Galatea: A Bucolic Romance by Curtis Dunham (1909).
- The Carolyn Wells Year Book of Old Favorites and New Fancies for 1909 by Carolyn Wells (1908).
- Bible Rimes for the Not Too Young by Clare Beecher-Kummer (1909).
- Her Majesty the King: A Romance of the Harem Done into American from the Arabic by James Jeffrey Roche (1915).
- Spoon River Anthology by Edgar Lee Masters (edition of 1916).
- Idle Idyls by Carolyn Wells (1900; reissued as Baubles in 1917).
- Scrambled Eggs by Lawton Mackall (1920).

Books with introductions by Oliver Herford:

- Poems from "Life", orchestration by [i.e., edited by] Charles B. Faliswith, introductory words by Oliver Herford (1923).
- A Jongleur Strayed, Verses on Love and Other Matters Sacred and Profane by Richard Le Gallienne, introduction by Oliver Herford (1922).
- Skippy, from Life by Percy L. Crosby, an introduction by Oliver Herford (1924).

Miscellany

- The Literary Guillotine by Charles Battell Loomis (1903); Oliver Herford appears as a character (himself) in the text.
