= Vokes Theatre =

Coordinates: 42°21′33.7″N 71°20′15.8″W

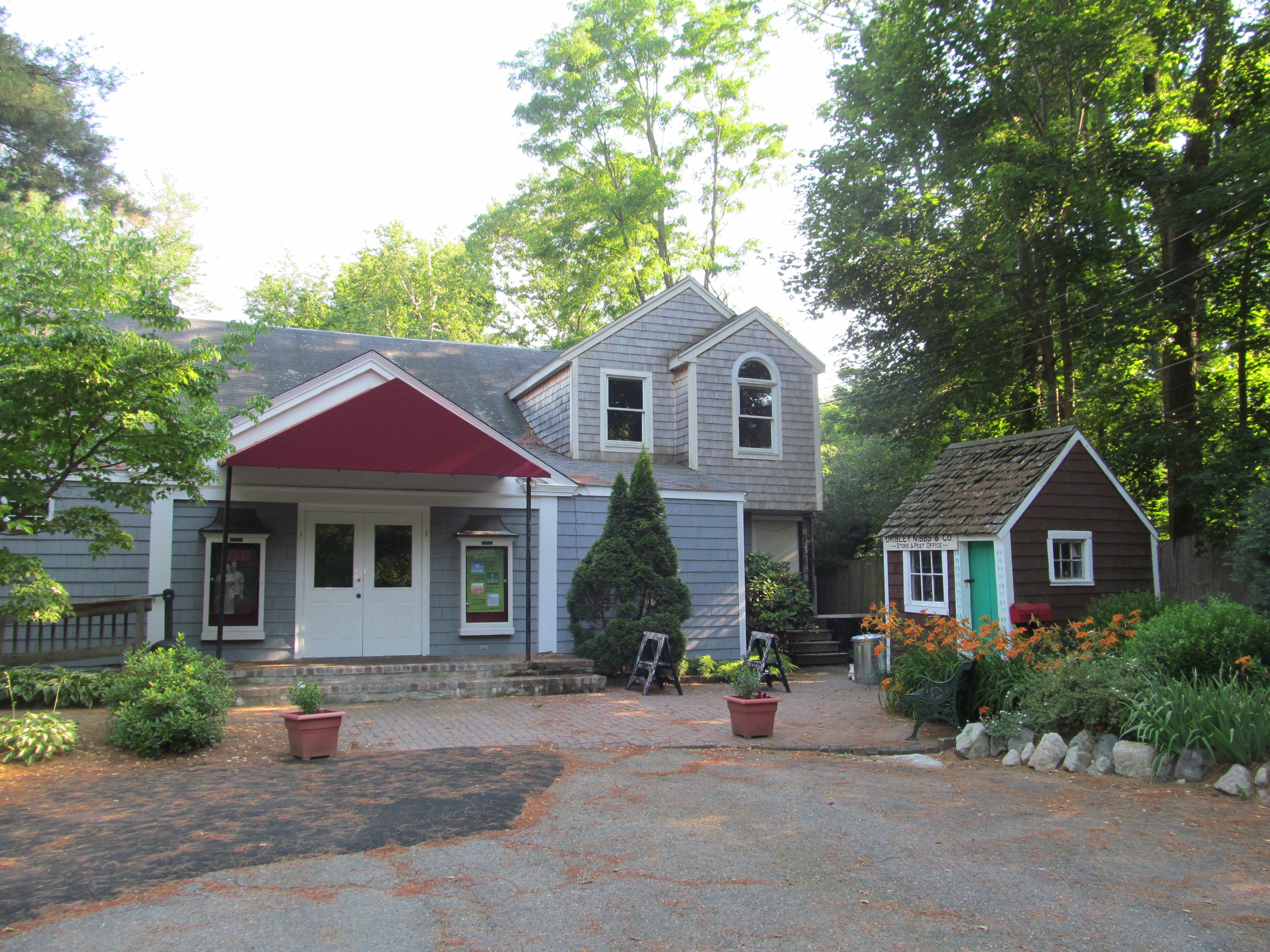
Vokes Theatre

The Vokes Theatre, also known as Beatrice Herford's Vokes Theatre, is a 1904 miniature of a London theatre in Wayland, Massachusetts built by and named for Beatrice Herford. The theatre is located on the estate of Herford and her husband, Sidney Hayward.

== History ==
Herford built the theatre as a tribute to the London music halls that were typical for monologist's performances and in 1946, Herford donated the theatre to the Vokes Players, a local non-profit group.

For the first 30 years or so of the theatre's life, it was not open to the public. Rather, Herford would invite her friends, who included leading actors on the English-speaking stage, singers, New England artists, and others (it was an eclectic mix) to be her guests at her estate in Wayland. In the theatre, performing only for their own amusement, leading lights of the New York and London stages would perform plays as an ensemble. A wall exists showing the signatures of some of those who came to Wayland including Ellen Terry, George Arliss, Florence Arliss, Katharine Cornell; the house archives show that other guests included diva Geraldine Farrar, and actors Ethel Barrymore, John Drew, Nora Bayes, and others.

== Vokes Players ==
The name of the resident theater company, "Vokes Players", came as an honor to Herford and Hayward's friend, Rosina Vokes, a British actress who performed as part of the traveling Vokes family. From 1937, the Vokes Players have evolved into one of the premier community theater companies in New England, drawing many artists who work professionally in theater elsewhere. The theatre is currently known as one of the region's preeminent local theatres.
