= Franklin C. Watkins =

American painter

Franklin Chennault Watkins
- Born: 30 December 1894; New York City, New York, US
- Died: 4 December 1972 (aged 77); Bologna, Italy
- Known for: Painter
- Movement: Post-Impressionism, Modernism

Franklin Chennault Watkins (December 30, 1894 – December 4, 1972) was an American painter.

== Early life and education ==
Born in New York City, Watkins was the son of Benjamin Franklin Watkins of Reidsville, North Carolina, and Shirley Chennault Watkins of Louisville; he was a cousin, through his mother's sister, of poet Ogden Nash. His father was an inventor who made his career marketing patents. He had a brother, Edmund, who became a journalist and writer of short stories, and two sisters. As a baby he was taken to London, where his family lived; at other points throughout his childhood he lived in Rye, New York, Louisville, and Winston-Salem, North Carolina. His father's income fluctuated so that the family's financial situation was never stable, and this affected his education; he entered Groton School in 1908, but was forced to withdraw two years later due to money woes. He matriculated at the University of North Carolina, but, not liking the atmosphere, left after four days. He spent a year at the University of Virginia and several terms at the University of Pennsylvania before settling on a career in art, and he entered the Pennsylvania Academy of the Fine Arts in 1913. His teacher there was Cecilia Beaux, and while a student he received two Cresson Traveling Scholarships; he left for two years to work in New York and earn money for tuition, but returned in 1916. Henry McCarter was another teacher. Watkins would remain associated with the school for much of the rest of his life. During World War I he painted camouflage for the United States Navy, and from 1918 to 1923 he was a commercial artist with the Philadelphia advertising firm of N. W. Ayer. Serving alongside him in the Navy was Arthur B. Carles, who would become a lifelong friend.

== Career ==
Watkins' prize-winning 1931 oil painting Suicide in Costume was highly controversial for its morbid subject matter.

Watkins first gained notice with the painting Suicide in Costume depicting a man in a clown costume lying on a table and holding a smoking gun. The piece, which was highly controversial and criticized for its morbid subject matter, won the 1931 Carnegie Prize. So great was its notoriety that the artist kept a low profile for some years thereafter. Today the painting is owned by the Philadelphia Museum of Art. Its success opened doors for Watkins in Philadelphia society, and he soon gained a reputation as a portraitist, though he also painted still lifes, landscapes and animals. In 1934 Lincoln Kirstein commissioned him to provide sets and costumes for George Balanchine's ballet Transcendence. He was also a muralist, providing decorations for the Rodin Museum in Philadelphia. Notable sitters included Jefferson B. Fordham, dean of the law school at the University of Pennsylvania; Eugene Strecker, the psychiatrist; Joseph S. Clark, Mayor of Philadelphia; and the three Beinecke brothers. He was commissioned to paint a portrait of Franklin D. Roosevelt in 1941, but the attack on Pearl Harbor intervened, and the president never sat for him. The artist's portraits could be controversial; the likeness of Clark in particular was not well-received, and was only accepted by the city at the subject's insistence. Some critics have stated that Watkins derived his influence from Thomas Eakins. He also painted many religious works, and has been compared to William Blake. Other artists cited as influences include Paul Gauguin, Henri de Toulouse-Lautrec, and Paul Cézanne.

Watkins, known as "Watty" among friends, received many awards throughout his career, and was honored with numerous one-man shows during his life. These included bronze medals at the 1937 Exposition Internationale des Arts et Techniques dans la Vie Moderne in Paris and the Musee du Jeu de Paume in 1938, a gold medal from the Corcoran Gallery of Art in 1939, and the 1953 Fulbright professorship to Italy. He was elected to the American Philosophical Society in 1967. He occasionally wrote articles about his discipline for art magazines; one particularly notable piece, "An Artist Talks to His Students", appeared in the Magazine of Art in December, 1941. He taught at his alma mater for nearly a quarter-century.

== Personal life and legacy ==
Watkins married twice, having no children by either marriage. His first wife, whom he married in 1927, was Fredolyn Gimbel, daughter of Ellis Gimbel of the Gimbels family. After their divorce, he married Mrs. Ida Quigley Furst. He was proud of his Southern heritage, and considered himself North Carolinian throughout his life, although he had not lived in the state save for a brief sojourn in Winston-Salem in 1910 and 1911. Nevertheless, he exhibited work as part of the Piedmont Festival of Music and Art in 1944 and 1946, and he and his wife visited Reidsville not long before his death. An early oil study is currently owned by the Ackland Art Museum in Chapel Hill, North Carolina.

In October 1972 the Vatican Museum planned to open a wing dedicated to contemporary art; Watkins was one of six Americans whose work was chosen for display. The artist and his wife traveled to Italy for the event only to find it postponed. They decided to remain there on a visit, but he died in Bologna soon after.

Besides the collections already noted, works by Watkins may be found in the Smithsonian American Art Museum, the Pennsylvania Academy of Fine Arts, the University of Michigan Museum of Art, the Woodmere Art Museum, and the Whitney Museum of American Art.

The Archives of American Art contain his papers and an oral history interview conducted the year before his death.
