= Henry Bainbridge McCarter =

American painter and illustrator

- Photo of McCarter, 1933 by Harry B. Wright, Philadelphia Art Museum
- Born: 5 July 1864; Norristown, Pennsylvania
- Died: 20 November 1942 (aged 78); Philadelphia, Pennsylvania
- Known for: Painter, Illustrator
- Movement: Post-Impressionism, Modernism

Henry Bainbridge McCarter (1864–1942) was an American illustrator and painter known for his influence on the modernistic art movements. McCarter worked as an illustrator in New York before becoming an instructor at the Pennsylvania Academy of the Fine Arts for forty years. He won numerous medals for illustration, watercolor and oil painting including the 1938 Temple Gold Medal.

== Early life and education ==
McCarter was born 5 July 1864 in Norristown, Pennsylvania. In 1879, he began attending the Pennsylvania Academy of the Fine arts where one of his instructors was Thomas Eakins. However, he described the five years of his studies there as "lost years." In 1887, he went to Paris where he studied with Puvis de Chavannes, Léon Bonnat and Thomas Alexander Harrison of the École nationale supérieure des Beaux-Arts.

== Career ==
While in Paris, McCarter became an apprentice in lithography to Toulouse Lautrec. He then returned to the USA and moved to New York to work as a graphic illustrator. McCarter drew illustrations for Scribners, Harpers, McClure's and Collier's magazines, among others. He also taught at the Art Students League of New York. In 1902 he accepted a position as a watercolor teacher and the first instructor of illustration at his former school, the Pennsylvania Academy of the Fine Arts in Philadelphia. He was an instructor there for the next forty years. Although he began as an illustrator, by the 1920s McCarter concentrated on watercolor and oil painting of still lifes and landscapes.

According to the art curator W. Douglass Paschal, McCarter "sought a path merging the compositional structures, brushwork and strong coloration of the Post-Impressionists and Fauves he admired." McCarter became a strong advocate for modernism among his students at PAFA. Students who McCarter influenced included Franklin C. Watkins, Charles Demuth, Norman Carton, and Arthur B. Carles.

=== Awards ===
McCarter received numerous awards during his career, including: a bronze medal at the Buffalo Exposition (1901); silver medal at the Louisiana Purchase Exposition (1904); the Beck Prize at the Pennsylvania Academy of Fine Arts (PAFA (1906); gold medal at the Panama–Pacific International Exposition (1915); the Joseph Pennell Memorial Prize for watercolor (PAFA (1940); the gold medal from the Art Club of Philadelphia (1936); and the Temple Gold Medal at the 134th Annual Exhibition of Pennsylvania Academy of the Fine Arts (1938).

He won the Fellowship Gold Medal for his “dreamlike and ethereal” oil painting titled Old Trappe Church in 1941.

== Personal life ==
McCarter neither married nor had children. He died of a heart attack on 20 November 1942 in Philadelphia, Pennsylvania, aged 76. McCarter was buried at the Church of Messiah Cemetery in Gwynedd, Pennsylvania

== Selected works ==
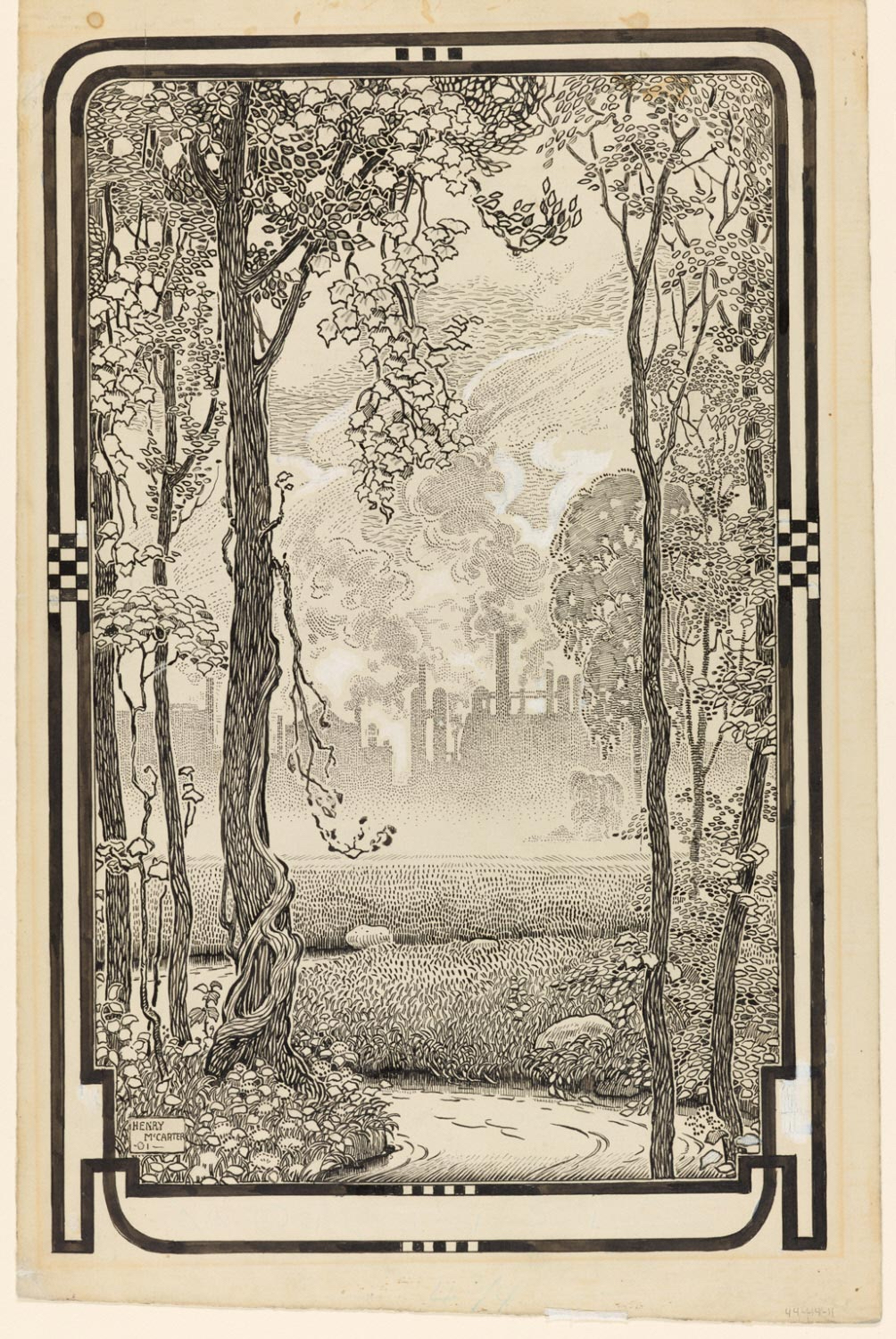
On the City's Edge, 1901, pen and ink drawing

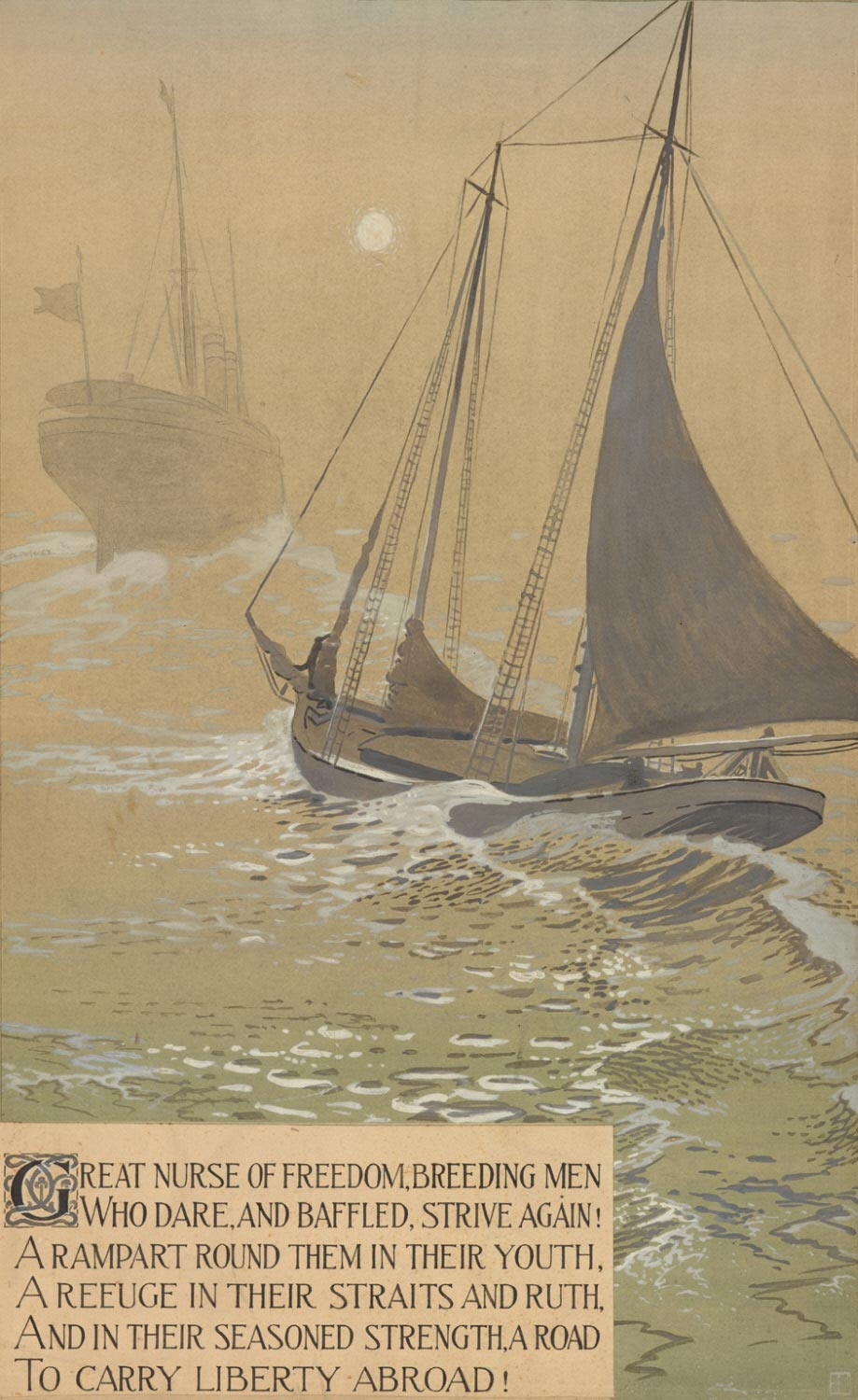
Illustration for the poem "The Sea is His" by Edward Sandford Martin in 1898 Scribner's Magazine.

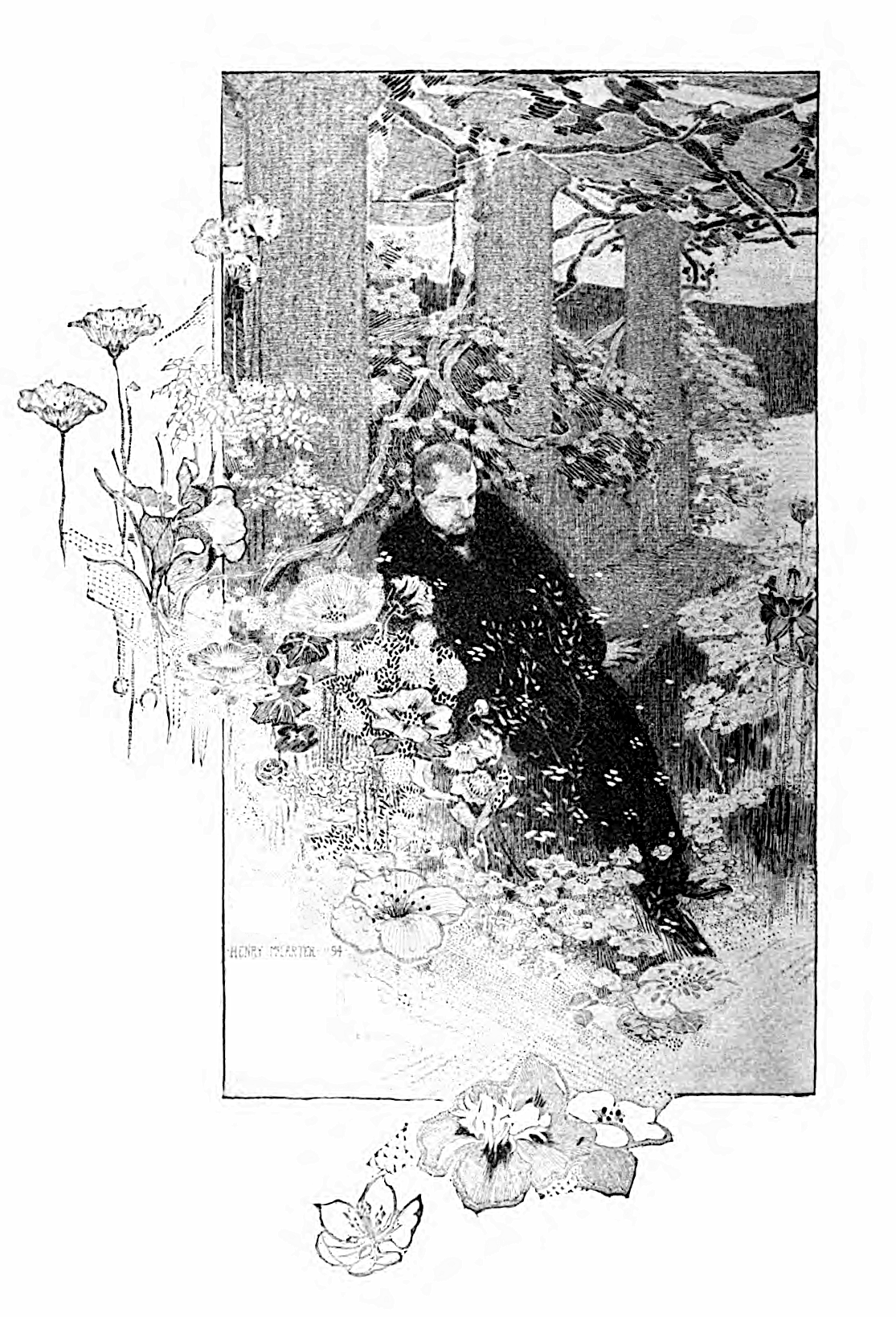
From Poems of Paul Verlaine, trans. by Gertrude Hall, 1895

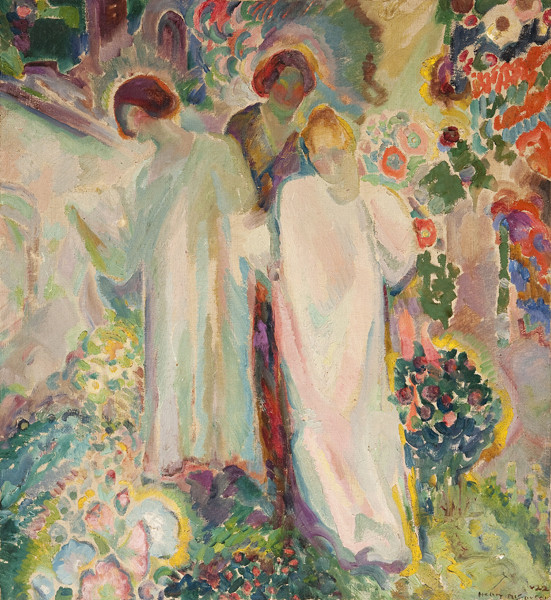
Three Women in a Garden, 1922, oil on canvas, Philadelphia Museum of Art
