= American Academy of Arts and Letters =

Honor society in New York City

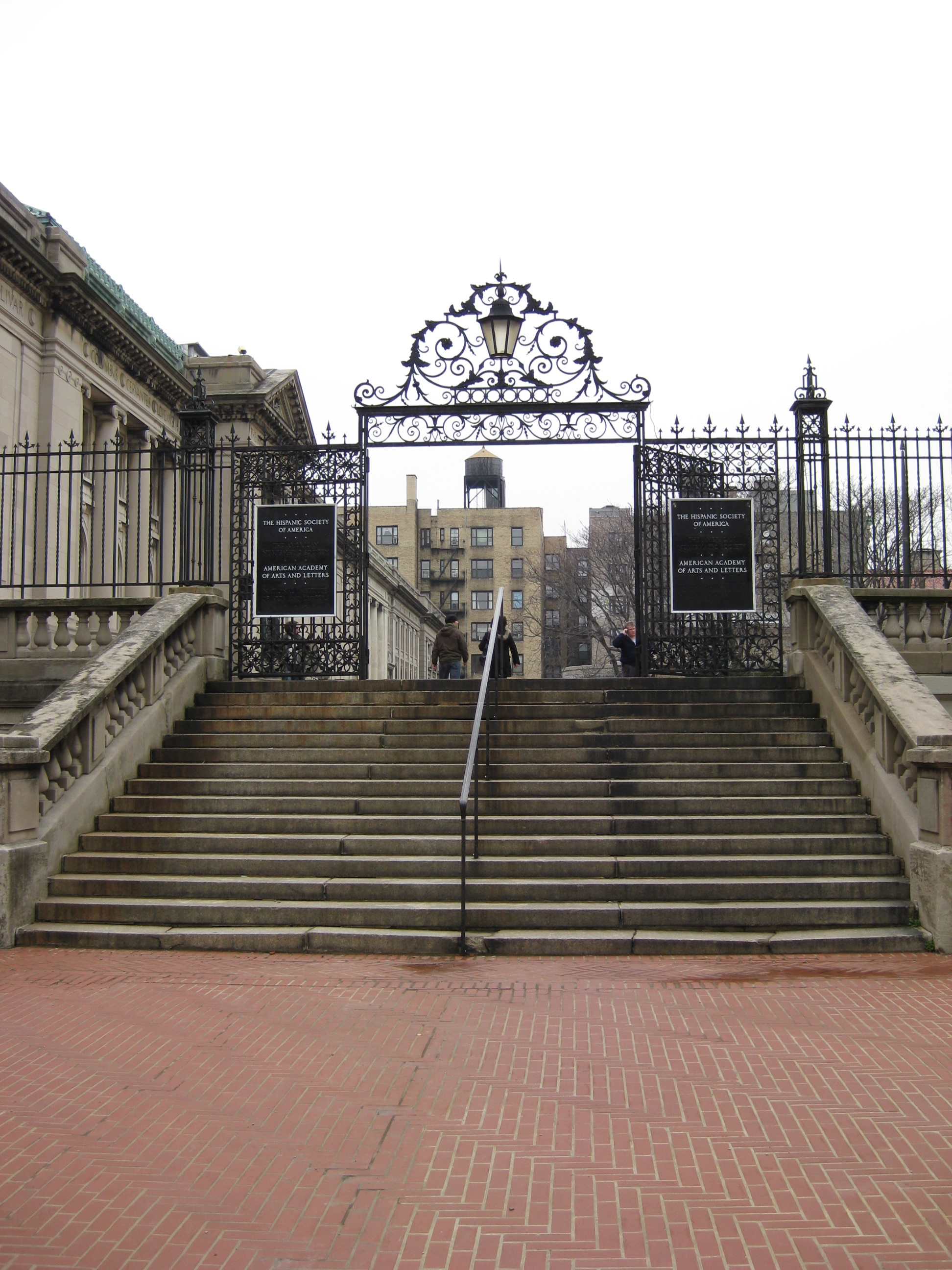
Audubon Terrace in Manhattan in April 2008

The American Academy of Arts and Letters is a 300-member honor society whose goal is to "foster, assist, and sustain excellence" in American literature, music, and art. Its fixed number membership is elected for lifetime appointments. Its headquarters is in the Washington Heights neighborhood of Manhattan in New York City. It shares Audubon Terrace, a Beaux Arts/American Renaissance complex on Broadway between West 155th and 156th Streets, with the Hispanic Society of America and Boricua College.

The academy's galleries are open to the public on a published schedule. Exhibits include an annual exhibition of paintings, sculptures, photographs and works on paper by contemporary artists nominated by its members, and an annual exhibition of works by newly elected members and recipients of honors and awards. A permanent exhibit of the recreated studio of composer Charles Ives was opened in 2014.

The auditorium is sought out by musicians and engineers wishing to record live, as the acoustics are considered among the city's finest. Hundreds of commercial recordings have been made there.

== History ==
=== Early years ===
The American Academy and Institute of Arts and Letters was formed from three parent organizations. The first, the American Social Science Association, was founded in 1865 in Boston. The second was the National Institute of Arts and Letters, which ASSA's membership created in 1898. The qualification for membership in the NIAL was notable achievement in art, music, or literature. The NIAL's membership was at first limited to 150 (all men). The third organization was the American Academy of Arts, which NIAL's membership created in 1904 as a preeminent national arts institution, styling itself after the French Academy.

The AAA's first seven academicians were elected from ballots cast by the NIAL membership. They were William Dean Howells, Samuel L. Clemens, Edmund Clarence Stedman, and John Hay, representing literature; Augustus Saint-Gaudens and John La Farge, representing art; and Edward MacDowell, representing music. The NIAL membership increased in 1904, with the introduction of a two-tiered structure: 50 academicians and 200 regular members. Academicians were gradually elected over the next several years. The elite group (academicians) were called the "Academy", and the larger group (regular members) was called the "Institute". This strict two-tiered system persisted for 72 years (1904–1976).

In 1908, the poet Julia Ward Howe was elected to the AAA, becoming the first female academician.

In 1976, the NIAL and AAA merged, under the name American Academy and Institute of Arts and Letters. The combined Academy/Institute structure had a maximum of 250 living U.S. citizens as members, plus up to 75 foreign composers, artists, and writers as honorary members. It also established the annual Witter Bynner Poetry Prize in 1980 to support young poets. The election of foreign honorary members persisted until 1993, when it was abandoned.

=== Federally chartered corporation ===
The academy holds a Congressional charter under Title 36 of the United States Code (42 USC 20301 et seq.), making it one of the country's comparatively rare "Title 36" corporations. The 1916 statute of incorporation established this institution among a small number of other similarly chartered patriotic and national organizations. The federal incorporation was originally construed primarily as an honor. The special recognition neither implies nor accords Congress any special control over the academy, which functions independently.

Active sponsors of Congressional action were Senator Henry Cabot Lodge of Massachusetts and former President Theodore Roosevelt. The process that led to the creation of this federal charter was controversial and the first attempt to gain the charter in 1910 failed. Lodge reintroduced legislation, which passed the Senate in 1913. The academy was incorporated under the laws of the State of New York in 1914, which resulted in Congressional approval in 1916.

== Buildings ==
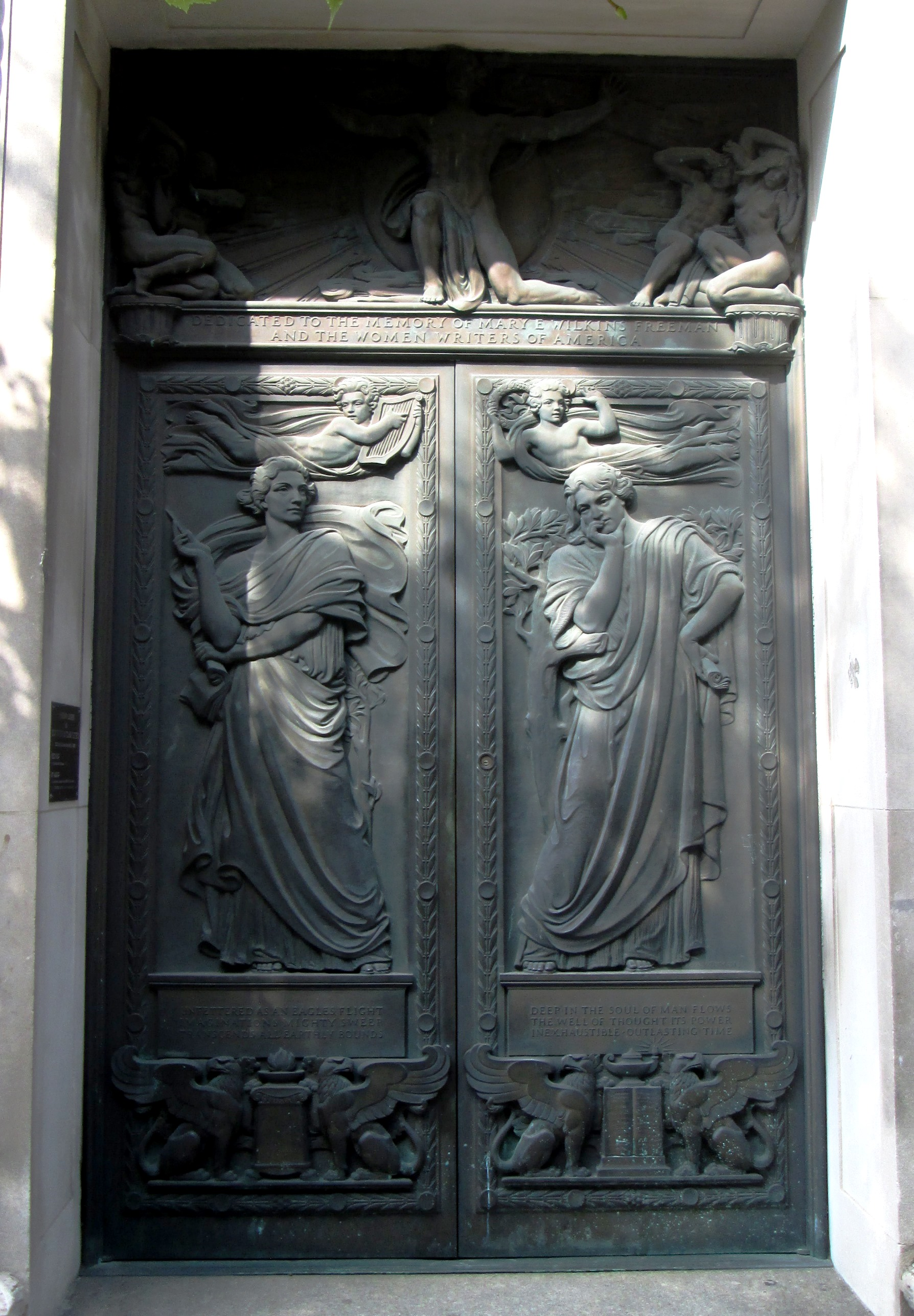
The bronze entrance doors to the administration building on West 155th Street were designed by Academy member Adolph Alexander Weinman and are dedicated to the memory of Mary Eleanor Wilkins Freeman and to the women writers of the United States.

The academy occupies three buildings on the west end of the Audubon Terrace complex created by Archer M. Huntington, the heir to the Southern Pacific Railroad fortune and a noted philanthropist. To help convince the American Academy of Arts and Letters and the National Institute of Arts and Letters, which were separate but related organizations at the time, to move to the complex, Huntington established building funds and endowments for both.

The first building, on the complex's south side, along West 155th Street, was designed by William M. Kendall of McKim, Mead & White; Kendall was also a member of the academy. This Anglo-Italian Renaissance administration building was designed in 1921 and opened in 1923. On the north side, another building housing an auditorium and gallery was designed by Cass Gilbert, also an academy member, and built in 1928–1930. These additions to the complex necessitated considerable alterations to the Audubon Terrace plaza, which were designed by McKim, Mead & White.

In 2007, the American Numismatic Society, which had occupied a Charles P. Huntington-designed building immediately to the east of the academy's original building, vacated that space to move to smaller quarters downtown. This building, which incorporates a 1929 addition designed by H. Brooks Price, became the academy's Annex and houses additional gallery space. In 2009, the space between the Annex and the administration building was turned into a new entrance link, designed by Vincent Czajka with Pei Cobb Freed & Partners.

== Membership ==
Members of the academy are chosen for life and have included some of the American art scene's leading figures. They are organized into committees that award annual prizes to up-and-coming artists. Although the names of some of the organization's members may not be well-known today, each was well known in their time. Greatness and pettiness are demonstrable among the academy members, even during the first decade, when William James declined his nomination on the grounds that his little brother Henry had been elected first. One of the giants of the academy in his time, Robert Underwood Johnson, casts a decades-long shadow in his one-man war against encroaching modernism, blackballing such writers as H. L. Mencken, F. Scott Fitzgerald, and T. S. Eliot (before his emigration to England disqualified him for full membership). Former Harvard president Charles William Eliot declined election to the academy "because he was already in so many societies that he didn't want to add to the number".

Although never explicitly excluded, women were not elected to membership in the early years. The admission of Julia Ward Howe in January 1908 (at age 88) as the first woman in the academy was only one incident in the intense debate about the consideration of female members. In 1926, the election of four women—Edith Wharton, Margaret Deland, Agnes Repplier and Mary Eleanor Wilkins Freeman—was said to have "marked the letting down of the bars to women". The first African-American woman member-elect was Gwendolyn Brooks in 1976.

Below is a partial list of past members of the American Academy of Arts and Letters and its successor institution, the National Institute and Academy of Arts and Letters:

- Henry Brooks Adams
- Herbert Adams
- Henry Mills Alden
- Nelson Algren
- Hannah Arendt
- Newton Arvin
- Wystan Hugh Auden
- Paul Wayland Bartlett
- Chester Beach
- Stephen Vincent Benét
- William Rose Benét
- Edwin Howland Blashfield
- William Brownell
- George de Forest Brush
- John Burroughs
- William S. Burroughs
- Nicholas Murray Butler
- George Washington Cable
- Hortense Calisher
- Joseph Campbell
- George Whitefield Chadwick
- William Merritt Chase
- Chou Wen-chung
- Timothy Cole
- Billy Collins
- Kenyon Cox
- John Dos Passos
- Bob Dylan
- Thomas Harlan Ellett
- Stanley Elkin
- Duke Ellington
- Ralph Ellison
- Daniel Chester French
- William Gaddis
- Hamlin Garland
- Charles Dana Gibson
- Cass Gilbert
- Richard Watson Gilder
- Basil Lanneau Gildersleeve
- Brendan Gill
- William Gillette
- Daniel Coit Gilman
- Allen Ginsberg
- Bertram G. Goodhue
- Robert Grant
- William Elliot Griffis
- Arthur Twining Hadley
- Childe Hassam
- Thomas Hastings
- Anthony Hecht
- David Jayne Hill
- Ripley Hitchcock
- Cecil de Blaquiere Howard
- Julia Ward Howe
- William Henry Howe
- William Dean Howells
- Archer Milton Huntington
- Charles Ives
- Henry James
- Robert Underwood Johnson
- Louis I. Kahn
- Kenneth Koch
- Maxine Kumin
- Sinclair Lewis
- Roy Lichtenstein
- Henry Cabot Lodge
- Abbott Lawrence Lowell
- Mary McCarthy
- Hamilton Wright Mabie
- Archibald MacLeish
- Frederick William MacMonnies
- J. D. McClatchy
- Brander Matthews
- William Keepers Maxwell Jr.
- William Rutherford Mead
- Gari Melchers
- Willard Metcalf
- Edna St. Vincent Millay
- Charles Moore
- Douglas Moore
- Paul Elmer More
- Robert Motherwell
- Georgia O'Keeffe
- Thomas N. Page
- Horatio Parker
- Joseph Pennell
- Bliss Perry
- William Lyon Phelps
- Charles Adams Platt
- Ezra Pound
- James Ford Rhodes
- James Whitcomb Riley
- George Lockhart Rives
- Elihu Root
- Theodore Roosevelt
- Mark Rothko
- Eero Saarinen
- Carl Sandburg
- John Singer Sargent
- Meyer Schapiro
- Arnold Schoenberg
- Harry Rowe Shelley
- Stuart Sherman
- Robert E. Sherwood
- Paul Shorey
- William Milligan Sloane
- Wallace Stevens
- Meryl Streep
- Lorado Taft
- Josef Tal
- Booth Tarkington
- Abbott Handerson Thayer
- William Roscoe Thayer
- Augustus Thomas
- Virgil Thomson
- Lionel Trilling
- Henry van Dyke
- John Charles Van Dyke
- Elihu Vedder
- Kurt Vonnegut
- Julian Alden Weir
- Barrett Wendell
- Edith Wharton
- Andrew Dickson White
- Thornton Wilder
- Brand Whitlock
- William Carlos Williams
- Woodrow Wilson
- Owen Wister
- George Edward Woodberry
- Frank Lloyd Wright
- James A. Wright

== Awards ==
=== Award for Distinguished Service to the Arts ===
The award, a certificate and $1,000, goes to a United States resident who has "rendered notable service to the arts".

- 2003: Leon Botstein
- 2008: Judith Jamison

=== Other awards ===
The academy gives out numerous awards, with recipients chosen by committees of academy members. Candidates for awards must be nominated by Academy members, except for the Richard Rodgers awards, for which an application may be submitted.

- Arts and Letters Award (formerly, the Academy Award of the American Academy of Arts and Letters): In 1941, the academy established awards to encourage creative work in the arts. Now $10,000 each, Academy Awards are given annually: five to artists, eight to writers, four to composers, and three to architects.
- Marc Blitzstein Award: The $5,000 award is given periodically to a composer, lyricist, or librettist, "to encourage the creation of works of merit for musical theater and opera". The award was established in 1965 by the friends of Marc Blitzstein, an academy member.
- Michael Braude Award for Light Verse: The $5,000 biennial award is given "for light verse written in English regardless of the country of origin of the writer".
- Arnold W. Brunner Memorial Prize: The annual prize of $5,000 goes to an architect of any nationality who has "made a contribution to architecture as an art".
- Benjamin H. Danks Award: The $20,000 award is given in rotation to a composer of ensemble works, a playwright, and a writer (fiction, nonfiction, poetry). Since 2002, the academy has administered the prize established by Roy Lyndon Danks in honor of his father, Benjamin Hadley Danks.
- Jimmy Ernst Award: Established by Dallas Ernst in memory of her husband, the Jimmy Ernst Award of $5,000 is given to a painter or sculptor "whose lifetime contribution to his or her vision has been both consistent and dedicated". The award has been presented annually since 1990.
- E. M. Forster Award: E. M. Forster, a foreign honorary member of the academy, bequeathed the U.S. royalties of his posthumous novel Maurice to Christopher Isherwood, who transferred them to the academy to establish this $15,000 award. It is given to a young English writer for an extended visit to the United States.
- American Academy of Arts and Letters Gold Medals: Each year the academy awards gold medals for distinguished achievement in two categories in rotation. The Gold Medal is given for the entire work of the recipient.
  - Belles Lettres, Criticism, Essays and Painting;
  - Biography and Music;
  - Fiction and Sculpture;
  - History and Architecture, including landscape architecture;
  - Poetry and Music;
  - Drama and Graphic Art.
- Walter Hinrichsen Award: The Walter Hinrichsen Award is given for the publication of "a work by a mid-career American composer".
- William Dean Howells Medal: This award is given every five years in recognition of the most distinguished American novel published during that period. It was established in 1925.
- Andrew Imbrie Award in Music: This award of $10,000, inaugurated in 2012, was made possible through a gift from Andrew and Barbara Imbrie. It is awarded annually to a mid-career composer of demonstrated artistic merit.
- The Charles Ives Prize: Six scholarships of $7,500 and two fellowships of $15,000 are now given annually to young composers. In 1998, the academy established the Charles Ives Living, an award of $75,000 a year for a period of three years given to an American composer. The award's purpose is to free "a promising talent from the need to devote his or her time to any employment other than music composition" during that period.
- The Charles Ives Opera Prize: In 2008, the academy awarded the inaugural Charles Ives Opera Prize of $50,000, to be given from time to time to a composer and a librettist for a recently produced opera. It is America's largest vocal music award.
- Sue Kaufman Prize for First Fiction: The $5,000 prize is given for the best published first novel or collection of short stories in the preceding year.
- Wladimir and Rhoda Lakond Award: an annual award of $5,000 "given either to a composition student or an experienced composer".
- Goddard Lieberson Fellowships: Two Goddard Lieberson Fellowships of $15,000 are given annually to young composers of extraordinary gifts. The CBS Foundation endowed the fellowships in memory of Lieberson, the late president of CBS Records.
- Russell Loines Award for Poetry
- American Academy of Arts and Letters Award of Merit: The Award of Merit, a medal and $10,000, is given each year, in rotation, to an outstanding person in America representing painting, the short story, sculpture, the novel, poetry, and drama.
- Metcalf Awards: In 1986, the academy received a bequest from Addison M. Metcalf, son of the late member Willard L. Metcalf, for two awards to honor young writers and artists of great promise. The Willard L. Metcalf Award in Art and the Addison M. Metcalf Award in Literature are biennial awards of $10,000.
- Katherine Anne Porter Award: This biennial award of $20,000 goes to a prose writer who has demonstrated achievements and dedication to the literary profession.
- Arthur Rense Prize: In 1998, this $20,000 award was established to honor "an exceptional poet" every third year.
- Richard Rodgers Awards for Musical Theater: These awards subsidize full productions, studio productions, and staged readings of musicals put on by nonprofit theaters in New York City. The plays are by composers and writers who are not already established. These are the only awards for which the academy accepts applications.
- Rome Prize in Literature: Every year the academy selects and partly subsidizes two young writers for a one-year residence at the American Academy in Rome.
- Richard and Hinda Rosenthal Foundation Awards: Each of these two awards are for $5,000. The first, established in 1956, is for a fiction work of "considerable literary achievement" published in the previous year. The second, created in 1959, is for a young painter "who has not yet been accorded due recognition".
- Medal for Spoken Language: This medal, awarded from time to time, recognizes individuals who set a standard of excellence in the use of spoken language.
- The Mildred and Harold Strauss Livings: These Livings provide an annual stipend of $50,000 a year for five years, awarded to two writers of English prose literature to enable them to devote their time exclusively to writing.
- Harold D. Vursell Memorial Award: This $10,000 award is given each year to honor a writer of "recent prose that merits recognition for the quality of its style".
- Morton Dauwen Zabel Award: This $10,000 biennial award is given in rotation to a poet, writer of fiction, or critic, "of progressive, original, and experimental tendencies".
- Thornton Wilder Prize
