= Beatrice Herford =

American actress

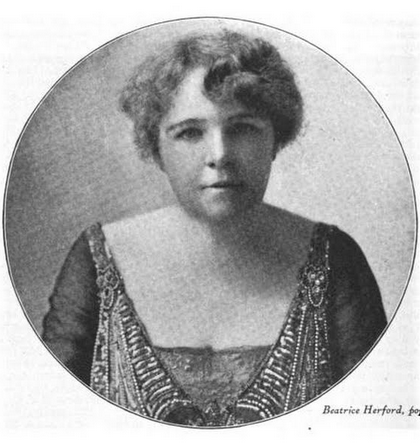
- From a 1921 publication
- Born: Beatrice Brooke Herford; October 13, 1867; Salford, Lancashire, England
- Died: July 18, 1952 (aged 84); Newport, Rhode Island, U.S.
- Other name: Beatrice Herford Hayward
- Occupations: Actress, diseuse, theater developer

Beatrice Brooke Herford (13 October 1867 – 18 July 1952) was an American actress, diseuse and vaudeville performer born in England.

== Biography ==
The daughter of Dr. Brooke Herford, a Unitarian minister, Herford was born in Salford, Lancashire, and spent her youth moving between England and the United States, following her father's changing jobs, at first in Chicago and then in Boston. Her brother, Oliver Herford, was an artist and humorist. She developed a talent for impersonating characters she encountered, and, in her twenties, she participated avidly in private theatricals, writing her own monologues. In 1895, she made her public debut at the Salle Érard in London, when she was said to be "the first female soloist to write and perform her own monologues as a one-person show", receiving favorable reviews.

She made her debut in the U.S. the following year, and in 1897 married Sidney Hayward, of Wayland, Massachusetts. She continued to deliver monologues both in public and in private. Her monologues, generally comic in nature, lampooned popular figures and types. Representative titles are "The Shop Girl" and "The Sociable Seamstress." One reviewer wrote that:

Even though she limited her speaking characters to women she appealed equally to men and women. The men probably enjoyed her monologues because they traded on certain stereotyped visions men traditionally held concerning women’s irritating ways. For example she create characters who were dependent on men, who talked incessantly and gossiped excessively, who were scatterbrained and tiresome as well as obnoxious. The women, however, also delighted in her monologues because, according to Herford, they never recognized themselves.

In his 1906 book Are you a Bromide, Gelett Burgess uses Herford's monologues as an example of his division of personality types into the quotidian (Bromides) and non-conformist (Sulphitic):

Miss Herford's inimitable monologues, being each the apotheosis of some typical Bromide—a shop-girl, a country dressmaker, a bargain-hunter and so on—become, through her art, intensely sulphitic. They are excruciatingly funny, just because she represents types so common that we recognize them instantly. Each expresses the crystallized thought of her particular bromidic group. Done, then, by a person who is herself a Sulphite par excellence, the result is droll.

In 1904, Herford and her friends built a small theater on her husband's Wayland property and named it Beatrice Herford's Vokes Theatre, after English actress Rosina Vokes. In 1937, Herford gave use of the theater to a group of actors organized as the Vokes Players. The group refurbished the theater and continues to perform in it.

Herford died in Newport, Rhode Island, in 1952.

== Legacy ==
Herford's monologues were well received on the New York and London stages, and she numbered among her friends the royalty of English-speaking theater. For over 30 years, her tiny theatre was open only to her friends, who performed for each other, often taking roles they would never have essayed in their public personas as stars of the legitimate stage. Her theatre is a Massachusetts historical site and houses a notable collection of theater memorabilia and photographs, in addition to remaining in vibrant and active use as the home of the Vokes Players.

Whenever the Vokes Players perform Herford's own material, her monologues continue to entertain modern audiences. The material shows her to be an artistic pioneer and a precursor to such renowned monologists as Ruth Draper, Lily Tomlin, and Whoopi Goldberg.

In recent years, the Vokes Players have undertaken a public campaign to restore the collection of historic photographs, many of them inscribed to Hayward and Herford by visiting artists, scholars, and celebrities. Information on "adopting" a photograph may be found on the Vokes Players website.

A wooden door in the historic theatre bears the signatures of many of the great artists who have performed on its stage over the last century. Audience members may view the signature door during intermissions.

Hayward and Herford named their theatre for Rosina Vokes (1854–94), a member of the Vokes Family Theatre. This touring troupe of English actors began as a true family act and continued performing from the 1870s through 1917 by "adopting" actors who took the surname "Vokes" professionally. They performed throughout the English-speaking world and were acclaimed for their comedic plays. Rosina Vokes and Beatrice Herford came from the same region of England, performed in the same theaters early in their careers, and became lifelong friends.

Rosina Vokes left the family company to found her own troupe in the United States, where she had married. Despite her growing weakness due to tuberculosis, she continued to perform in exhausting cross-country tours until a few days before her death in 1885. Though it was clear to audiences and critics that she was increasingly unwell, her artistry did not suffer, and critics regarded her continuing to work as artistic heroism. Her many obituaries uniformly describe her as a star loved by colleagues and audiences alike.
