= Gertrude Hall =

American novelist (1863–1961)

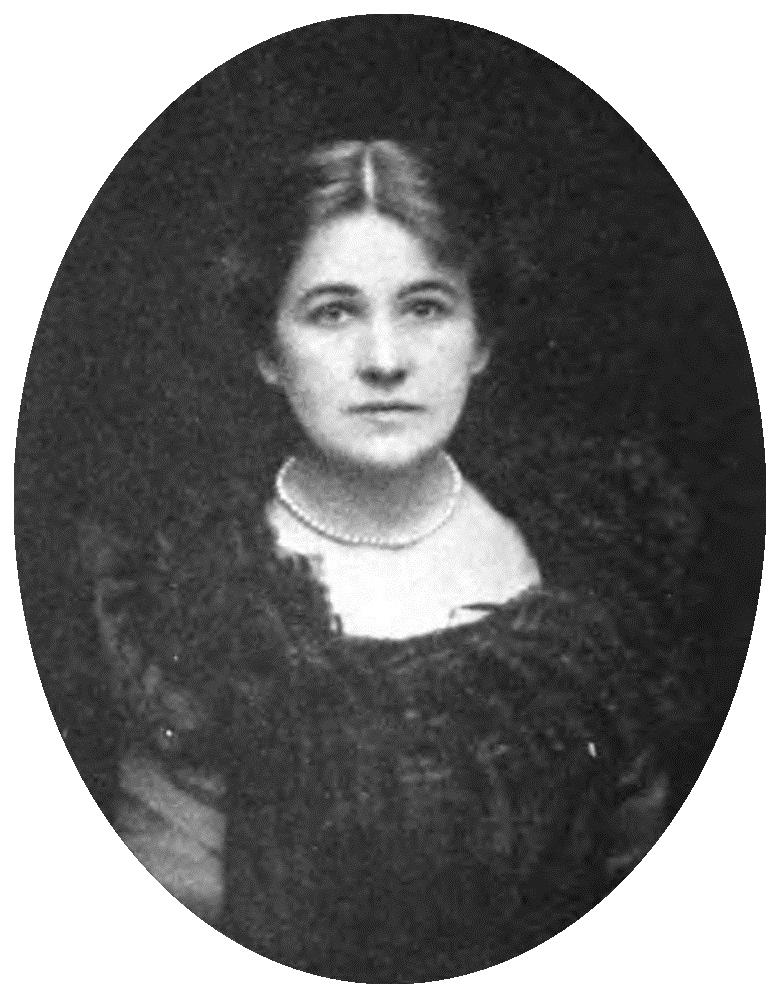
- Photograph by Hollinger, c. 1900
- Born: September 8, 1863; Boston, Massachusetts
- Died: February 28, 1961 (aged 97); New York City
- Occupations: Author, translator
- Writing career
- Genres: Fantasy fiction, historical fiction, novels of manners, poetry

Signature
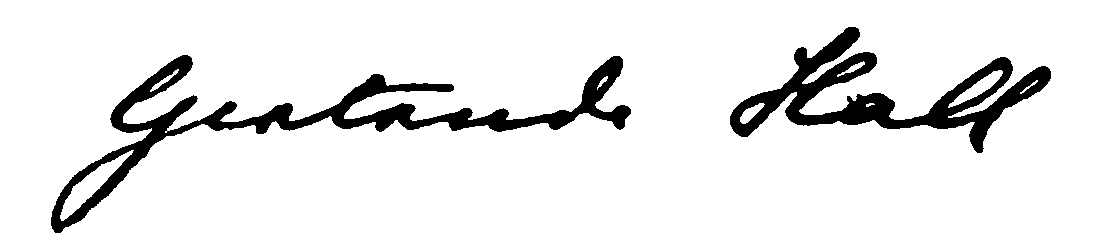

Gertrude Hall (September 8, 1863 – February 28, 1961), also known as Gertrude Hall Brownell, was an American writer of poems, short stories, novels, and nonfiction. She also translated works from the French. She was the second wife of American art and literary critic William Crary Brownell (1851–1928); after his death she anthologized his work and wrote a memoir of their life together.

== Literary career ==
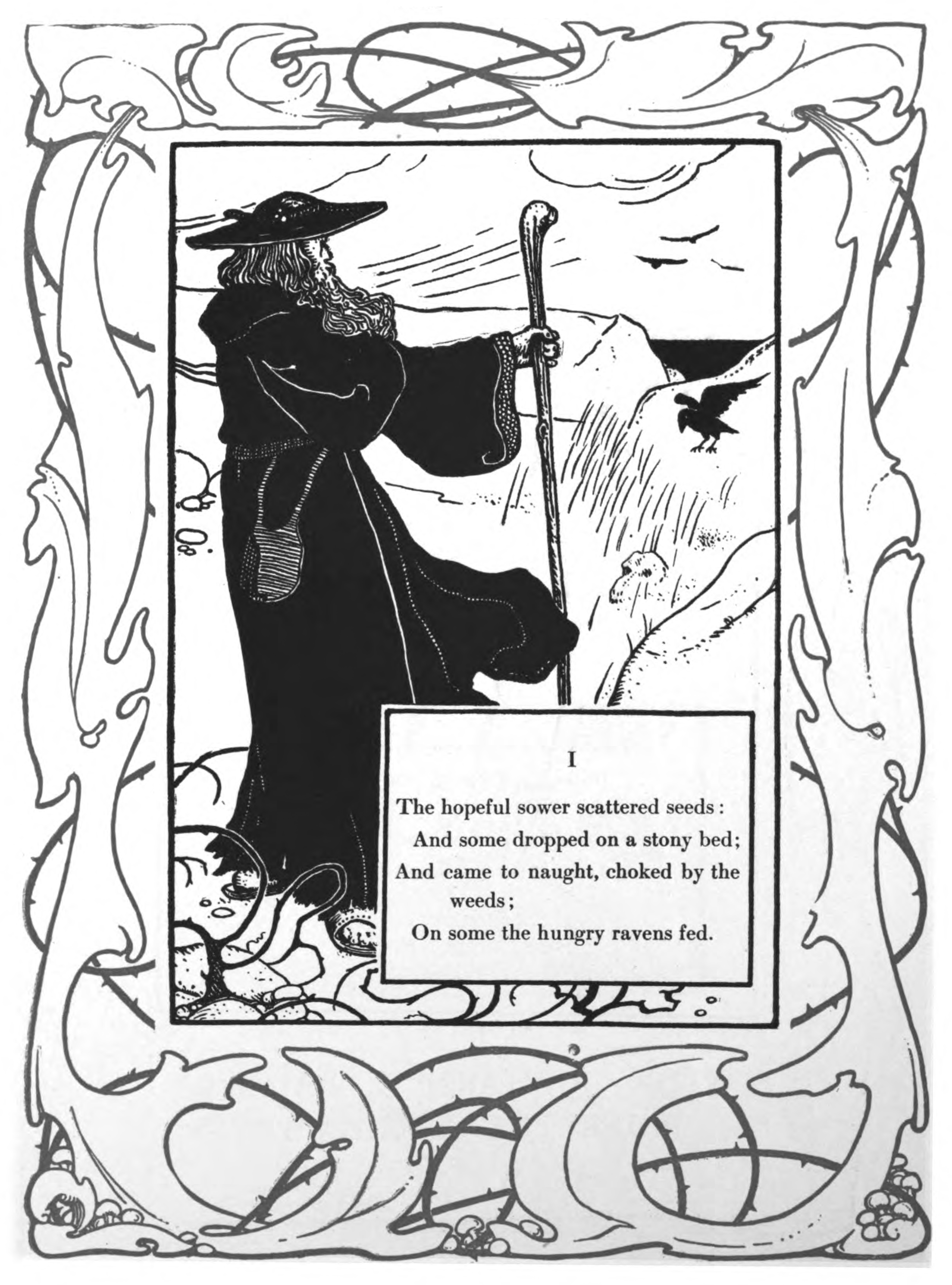
A page from The Legend of Sainte Cariberte des Oies Done into Verse (1909), illustrated by Warren Rockwell

=== Poetry ===
Hall's first published book was Verses, in 1890. More volumes of poetry followed. Bliss Carmen responded to her work with a long article in The Chap-Book; about her untitled poem that begins, "A fair king's-daughther once possessed," Carmen wrote: "Such a thing is surely worthy of Blake, with his tenderness and his insight—yes, and his peculiar cadence, too.…I cannot find the need to temper praise of so supreme a thing with any adjective, with any reservation, however delicate."

With the artist Oliver Herford, Hall collaborated on the collection Allegretto (1894); verses and illustrations are interwoven throughout the book. Louise Chandler Moulton wrote that both components were "equally bright, original and charming; one never saw pictures and poems that seemed so born of each other." Herford illustrated other works by Hall, including poster art for the short story collection Foam of the Sea and illustrations for her short stories "The Passing of Spring," "Vert and Gules" and "The Three in Green" in the magazine The Cosmopolitan.

In 1918, T. E. Rankin called her "our present-day poet of the quaint, the fanciful, the wistful.…Many of her poems are of nature and many of human love, and are as irresistible as the things they celebrate."

=== Fiction ===
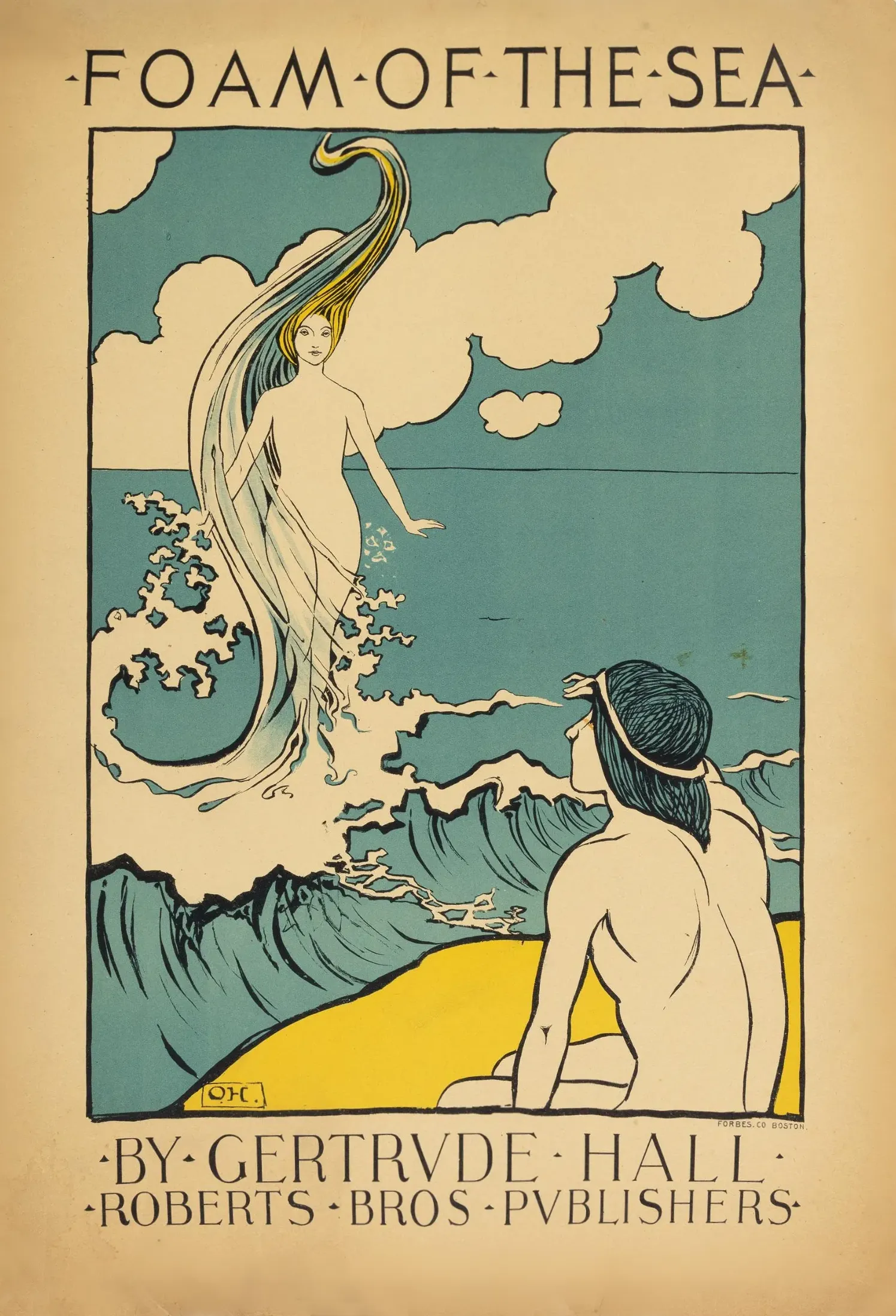
Poster for Foam of the Sea (1895), art by Oliver Herford

Her first book of fiction was the short story collection Far from To-Day (1892). Louise Chandler Moulton called the book "a work of real genius, Homeric in its simplicity, and beautiful exceedingly"; Harriet Prescott Spofford said the book gave "evidence of surprising genius….I recall no short stories at once so powerful and subtle as these." A second collection, Foam of the Sea, followed in 1895. Both books contained stories set in the distant past, and several of these featured elements of the fantastic. The New York Times compared Hall to Walter Pater and Théophile Gautier, and praised her "wonderful gift of language" and the "genuine power" of her storytelling. A review in The Critic compared her writing to sorcery: "The style is quietly, deliberately hypnotic.…This mediaeval maiden is a witch, and if she had really lived in the times she writes about, she would have been hung with the highest appreciation—or beheaded—according to local color. The evolution of the broomstick is the pen."

A third collection, featuring contemporary settings, The Hundred and Other Stories, followed in 1898.

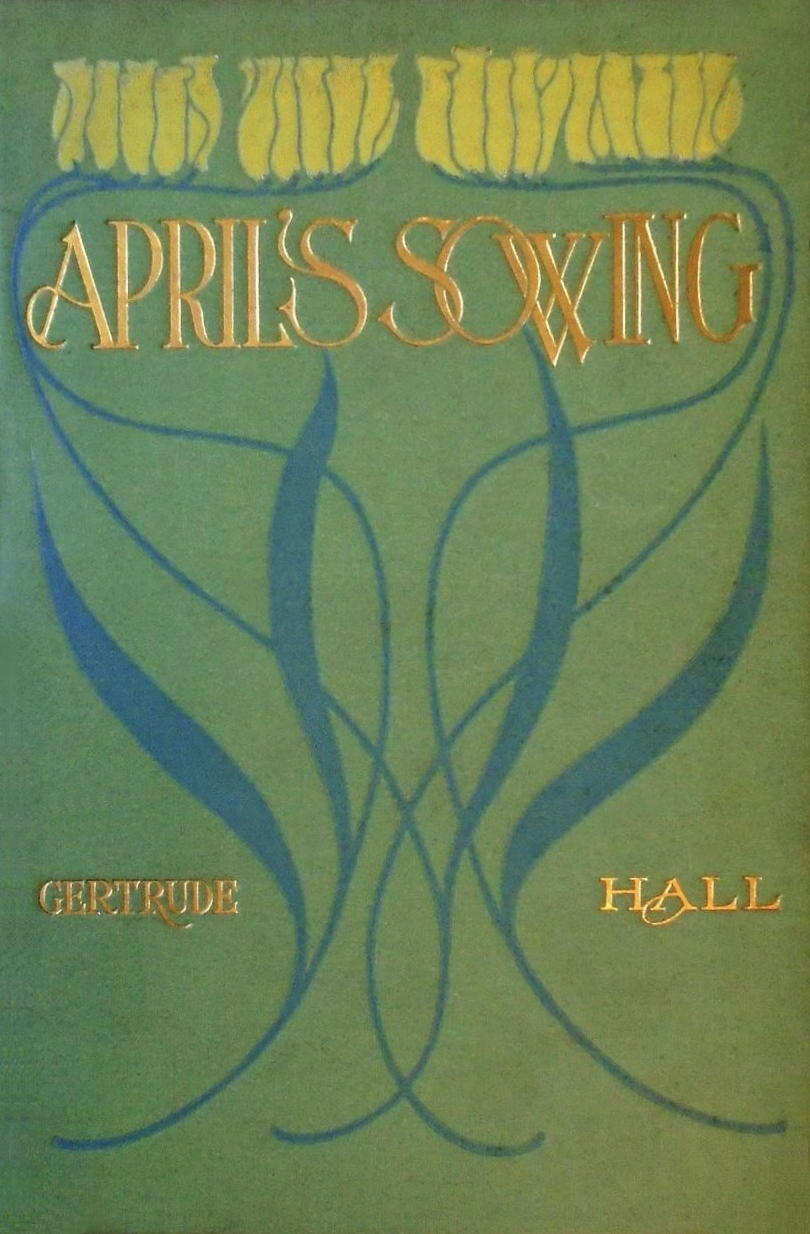
April's Sowing, 1900

in 1900, with April's Sowing, Hall moved to writing contemporary novels of manners with romantic themes. The Unknown Quantity (1910) and The Truth about Camilla (1913) followed. Aurora the Magnificent (1917), about a nouveau-riche American who takes up residence in the Anglophone community at Florence before World War I, "won much acclaim."

Her last novel was Miss Ingalis (1918), set at "the end of the nineteenth century," about an idealistic young woman who finds herself at odds with the values of her wealthy fiancé's family. The New York Times wrote:

In its material happenings the tale is slight, almost diaphanous, but in its spiritual drama—a far more difficult thing to make real and impressive—it is keenly interesting, skillfully and logically worked out, and carries the reader along so absorbed in what is going to be the fate of the heroine that he is likely to miss some of the artistic skill with which it is done and will want to go back and linger over it to get the full flavor of its quality.

In 1919 Hall's novel The Truth about Camilla (1913) was adapted for the stage by Edith Ellis, as Bravo, Claudia, and opened in Pittsburgh with Mimi Aguglia in the title role, but the play was not a success.

==== Tales of the fantastic ====
Hall's novels and a number of her short stories have contemporary settings. Another group of short stories have historical settings. A third group of short stories are fantastic in nature.

"Foam of the Sea" set in prehistory, employs a stark, highly stylized narrative to capture the magical thought-world of the protagonists. "The Sons of Philemon" takes place in Homeric Greece. In both of these stories, actual elements of the fantastic as marginal, such as an oblique mention of centaurs.

"Sylvanus" is the story of a faun stolen from his mother and raised by humans. In "The Three in Green" (subtitled "Märchen," a German word for fairy tale), a woodsman inadvertently fells three trees inhabited by female sprites. "Garden Deadly" anticipates the sword and sorcery genre with the tale of a blighted kingdom, an enchantress who turns men into animals, and a brash, brawny hero who sets out to save the day. "Paula in Italy," set in contemporary Florence, has a supernatural twist.

=== Nonfiction and translations ===
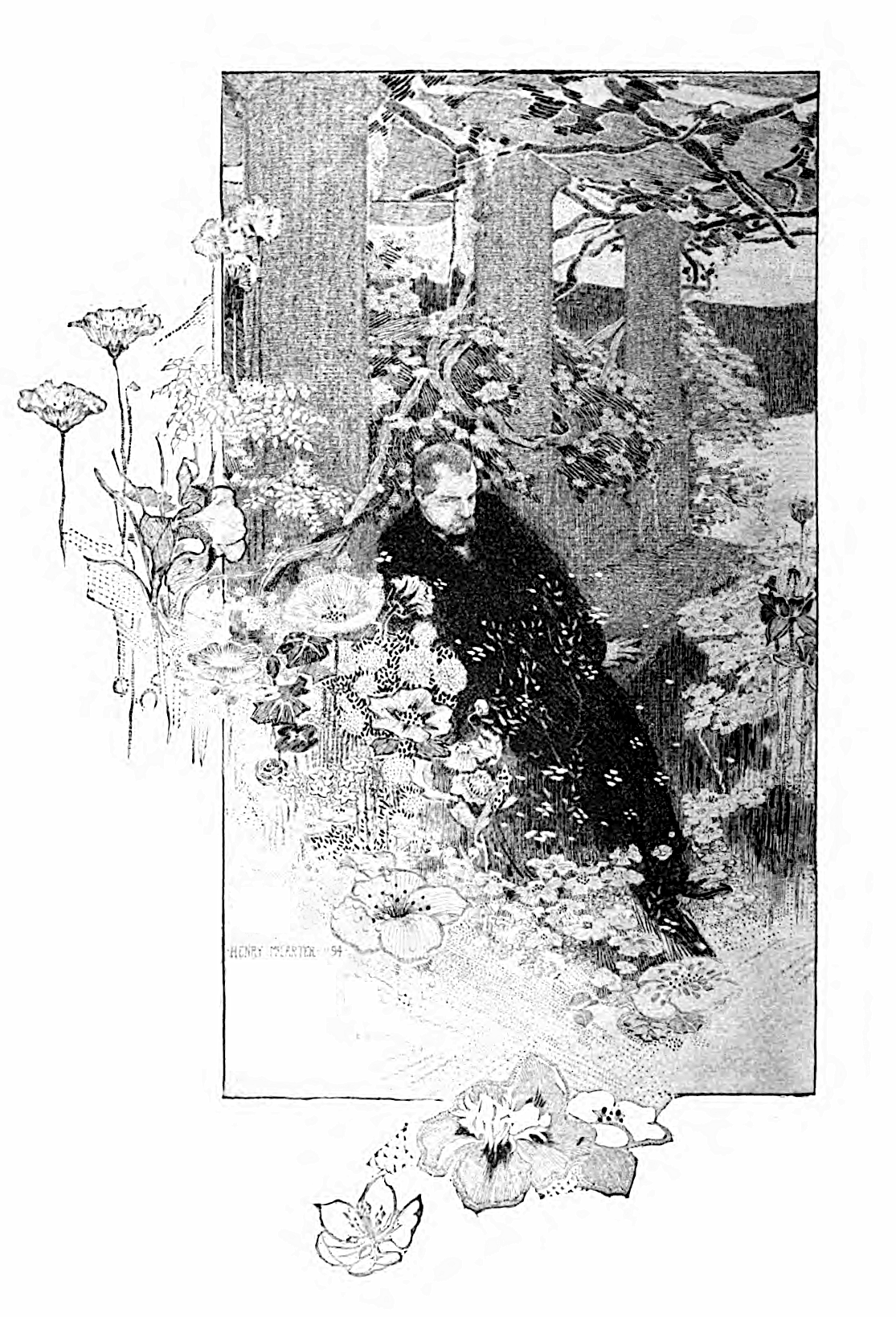
An illustration by Henry McCarter for Poems of Paul Verlaine (1895)

In 1907 Hall published The Wagnerian Romances, based on the stories of Wagner's operas; the book "is not critique or commentary," she wrote in the introduction, "it is presentation, picture, narrative." Ida Tarbell wrote that "Miss Hall has given us the very heart of the poems." The book was reissued in 1926 with an introduction by Willa Cather, who ranked it alongside Bernard Shaw's The Perfect Wagnerite. "This book of Miss Hall's is beautifully written, and the writer is a discerning critic who has spent her life among musicians of the first rank," who "has the rare gift of being able to reproduce the emotional effect of the Wagner operas upon the printed page; to suggest the setting, the scenic environment, the dramatic action, the personality of the characters. Moreover, she is able, in a way all her own, to suggest the character of the music itself."

Hall also translated works from the French by playwright Edmond Rostand and by poets Alphonse Daudet and Paul Verlaine. The New York Times, while asserting that Verlaine's verses were untranslatable, said that Hall's English versions were "singular, original, and profound."

Five years after the death of her husband in 1928, Hall authored and edited the volume William Crary Brownell, an Anthology of His Writings Together with Biographical Notes and Impressions of the Later Years (1933). Louis Kronenberger in The New York Times called it "a tribute to Brownell's memory" and "a distillation of his critical essence."

== Personal life ==
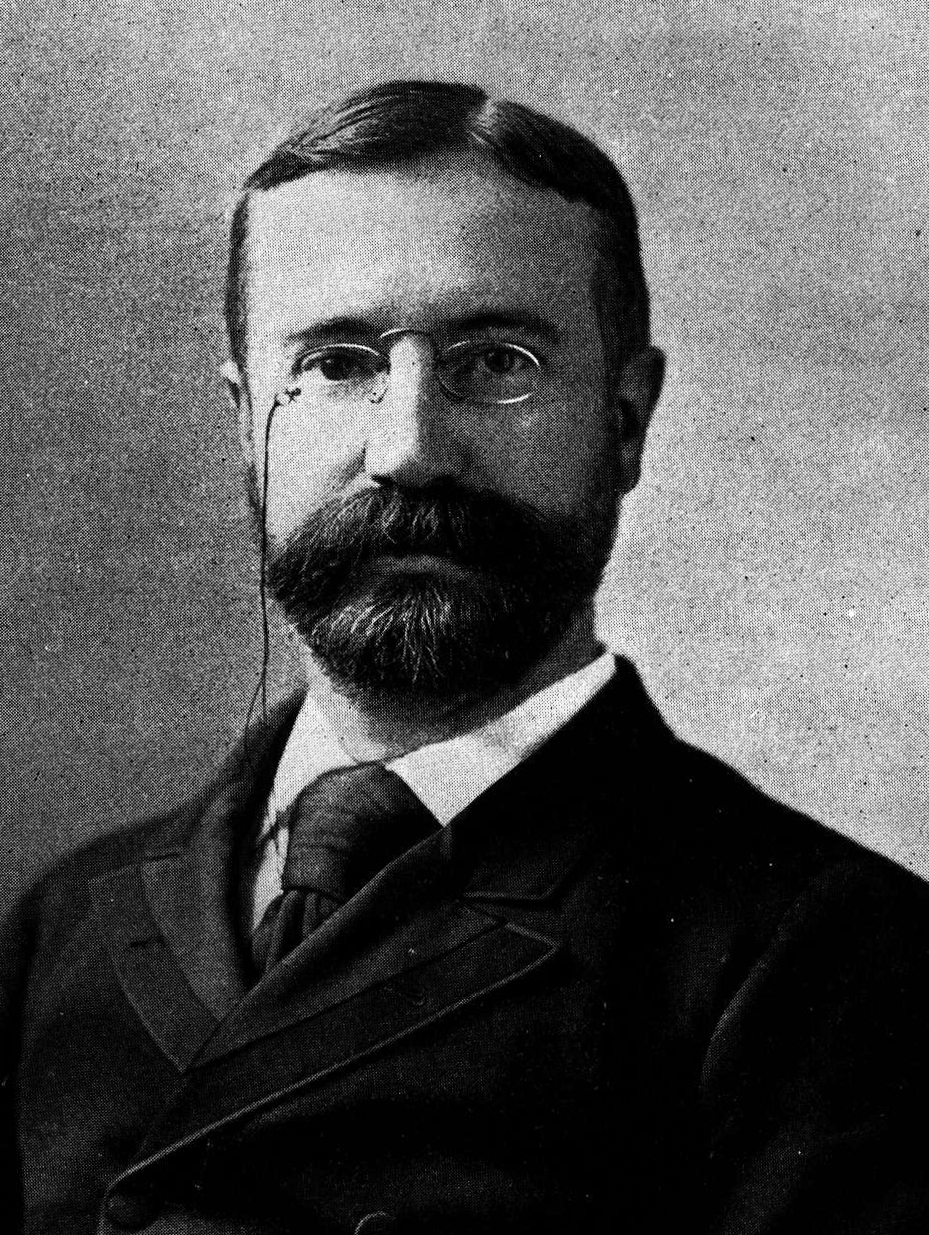
Hall's husband William Crary Brownell, in a photograph published in 1894

Hall was born in Boston. At the age of seven she was taken to Florence, Italy, where for nine years she and her sisters were boarding pupils at a pensionnat de demoiselles that was later described in her 1913 novel The Truth About Camilla. Florence would become the setting for a number of her stories, both historical and contemporary. On January 19, 1921, in the Church of the Ascension in New York, with the Rev. Dr. Percy Stickney Grant presiding, Hall married literary critic William Crary Brownell. Hall was 57; Brownell, 69. It was her first marriage, his second. (His first wife died in 1911.)

Of her relationship with Brownell she wrote:

I had known him first as a name, with a solid reputation attached, author of French Traits, which like everybody who respected himself I had read; then as an Olympian whom I from time to time met at his cousin's; then as a friend, assuredly intellectual, who called on us; after marriage, as a housemate in the stony-hearted city. Only in the country summer did I grow used to what those to whom he mainly was a critic can hardly have suspected: his capacity for play—for entering unaffectedly into all sorts of foolish play, sharing pleasure in the littlest things that catch the wandering fancies of women.

Hall was widowed in 1928. She reflected on her husband's career, and wrote a memoir of their life together, in William Crary Brownell, an Anthology of His Writings Together with Biographical Notes and Impressions of the Later Years (1933).

Hall dedicated several of her books to her mother and to her sisters. Her younger sister Grace Hall also became a novelist (Letters from G.G., 1909) and translator (The Surprises of Life by Georges Clemenceau, 1920), and shared her passion for Wagner, translating some of his songs into English. The two sisters were very close. In her memoir of Brownell, Hall wrote: "We were married on January 19, 1921, and in the autumn of that year moved to 49 West 59th Street; my younger sister Grace, with whom I had lived all my life, continuing to live with us."

Hall dedicated books to fellow authors Wolcott Balestier (Allegretto) and Frances Hodgson Burnett (Foam of the Sea). Another friend, Willa Cather, provided an introduction to the 1926 reissue of Hall's The Wagnerian Romances.

Hall's correspondence with author and editor Viola Roseboro' reveals that she was nicknamed "Kitty".

From at least 1938 Hall lived at 50 Central Park West, and resided there until a few weeks before her death, when a fall resulting in a fractured leg sent her to a nursing home. She died there on February 28, 1961, at the age of 97.

== Bibliography ==
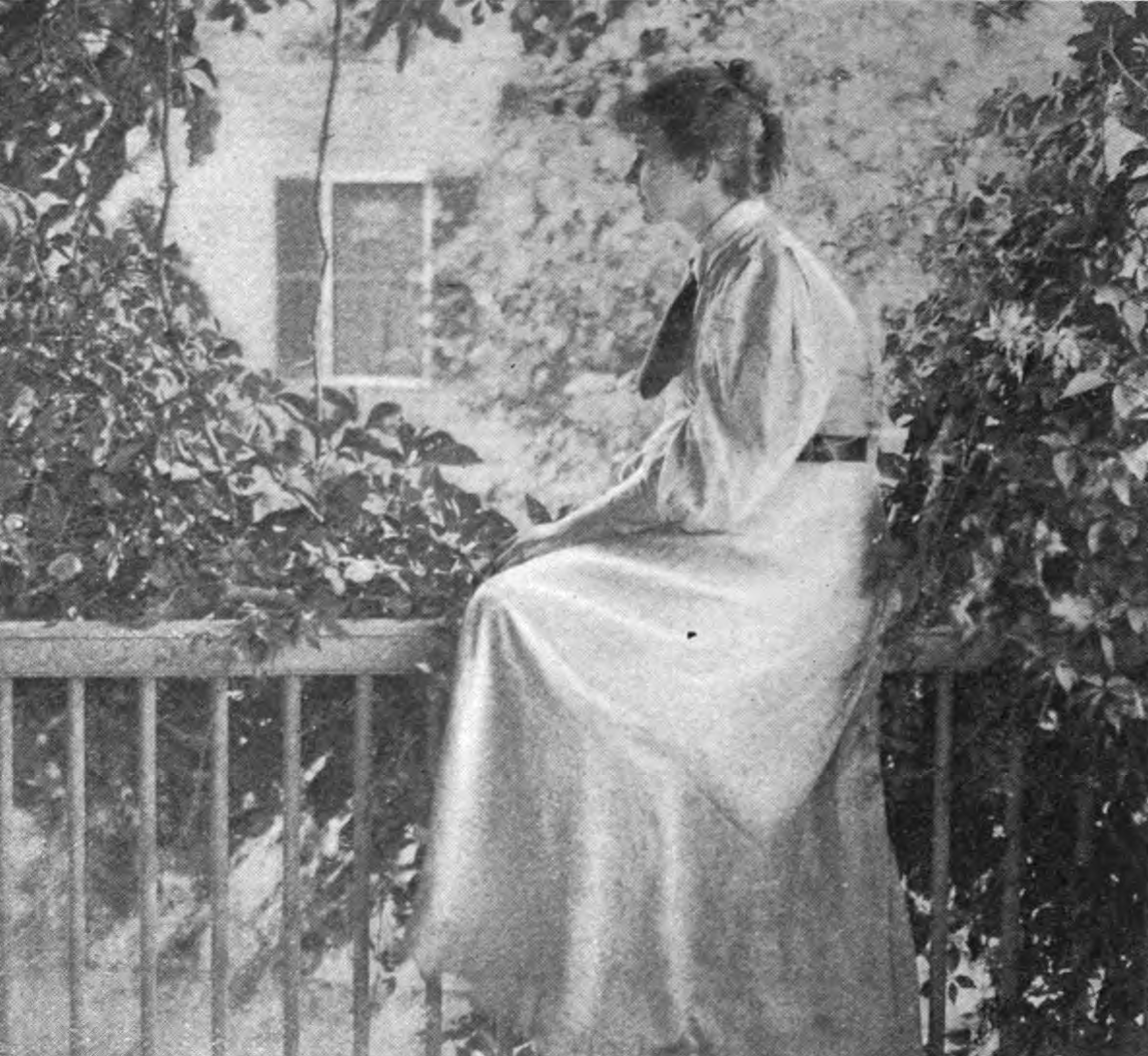
Gertrude Hall, photograph by Vivian Burnett (son of Frances Hodgson Burnett), published in The Critic, September 1898

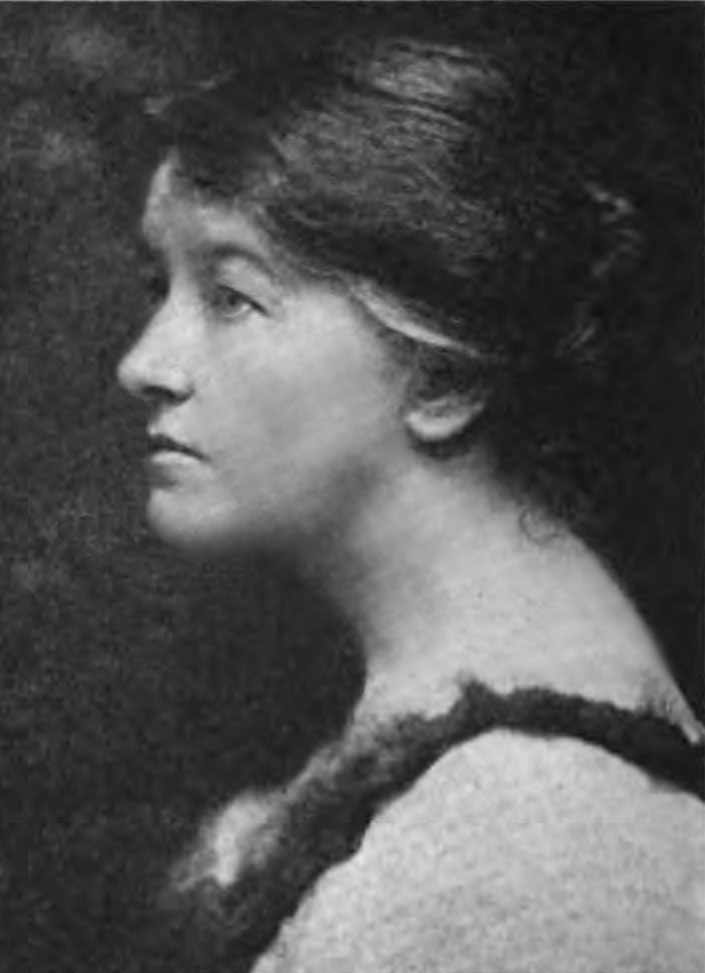
A photograph of Gertrude Hall published in The Century Illustrated Monthly Magazine in 1918

=== Poetry ===
- Verses (1890).
- Allegretto (1894), illustrated by Oliver Herford, dedicated to the memory or Wolcott Balestier.
- Age of Fairygold (1899).
- The Legend of Sainte Cariberte des Oies Done into Verse (1909), illustrations and decorative borders by Warren Rockwell.

=== Short stories ===
- Far from To-Day (1892), including "Tristiane," "Sylvanus," "The Sons of Philemon," "Theodolind," "Sevirol," and "Shepherds".
- "Vert and Gules", illustrated by Oliver Herford, The Cosmopolitan, vol. XVII, no. 6, October 1894, pp. 686–702.
- Foam of the Sea (1895), dedicated to Frances Hodgson Burnett, including "Foam of the Sea," "In Battlereagh House," "Powers of Darkness," "The Late Returning," "The Wanderers," and "Garden Deadly".
- "The Three in Green", illustrated by Oliver Herford, The Cosmopolitan, vol. XXI, no. 5, September 1896, pp. 528–543.
- The Hundred and Other Stories (1898), including "The Hundred," "The Passing of Spring," "Paula in Italy," "Dorastus,"and "Chloe, Chloris, and Cytherea".

=== Novels ===
- April's Sowing (1900).
- The Unknown Quantity (1910).
- The Truth about Camilla (1913).
- Aurora the Magnificent (1917).
- Miss Ingalis (1918).

=== Nonfiction ===
- "The Charm of Old Duxberry: An Historic Massachusetts Bay Town and Its Delightful Old and New Homes", Indoors and Out, vol. II, No. 6, July 1906, pp. 161–169.
- The Wagnerian Romances (1907; reissued 1926 with an introduction by Willa Cather).
- William Crary Brownell, an Anthology of His Writings Together with Biographical Notes and Impressions of the Later Years (1933); as Gertrude Hall Brownell, she edited the first section, An Anthology of His Work (pp. 1–225), and wrote the second and third sections, Biographical Notes (pp. 227–319) and the memoir Impressions of the Later Years (pp. 321–383); a photograph of Hall from 1928 appears facing p. 348.

=== Translations ===
- "The Court Fool" and "The Eagle and the Rhinoceros", translated from the anonymous German, in Hall's book Allegretto (1894), pp. 94–95.
- "The Plums" by Alphonse Daudet, translated from the French, in Hall's book Allegretto (1894), pp. 85–88.
- Poems of Paul Verlaine, translated [from French] by Gertrude Hall, pictured by Henry McCarter. Chicago, Stone & Kimball (1895).
- Cyrano de Bergerac by Edmond Rostand, translated from the French (1898).
- Chantecler, a play in four acts by Edmond Rostand, translated from the French (1912).
