= William Crary Brownell =

American critic (1851–1928)

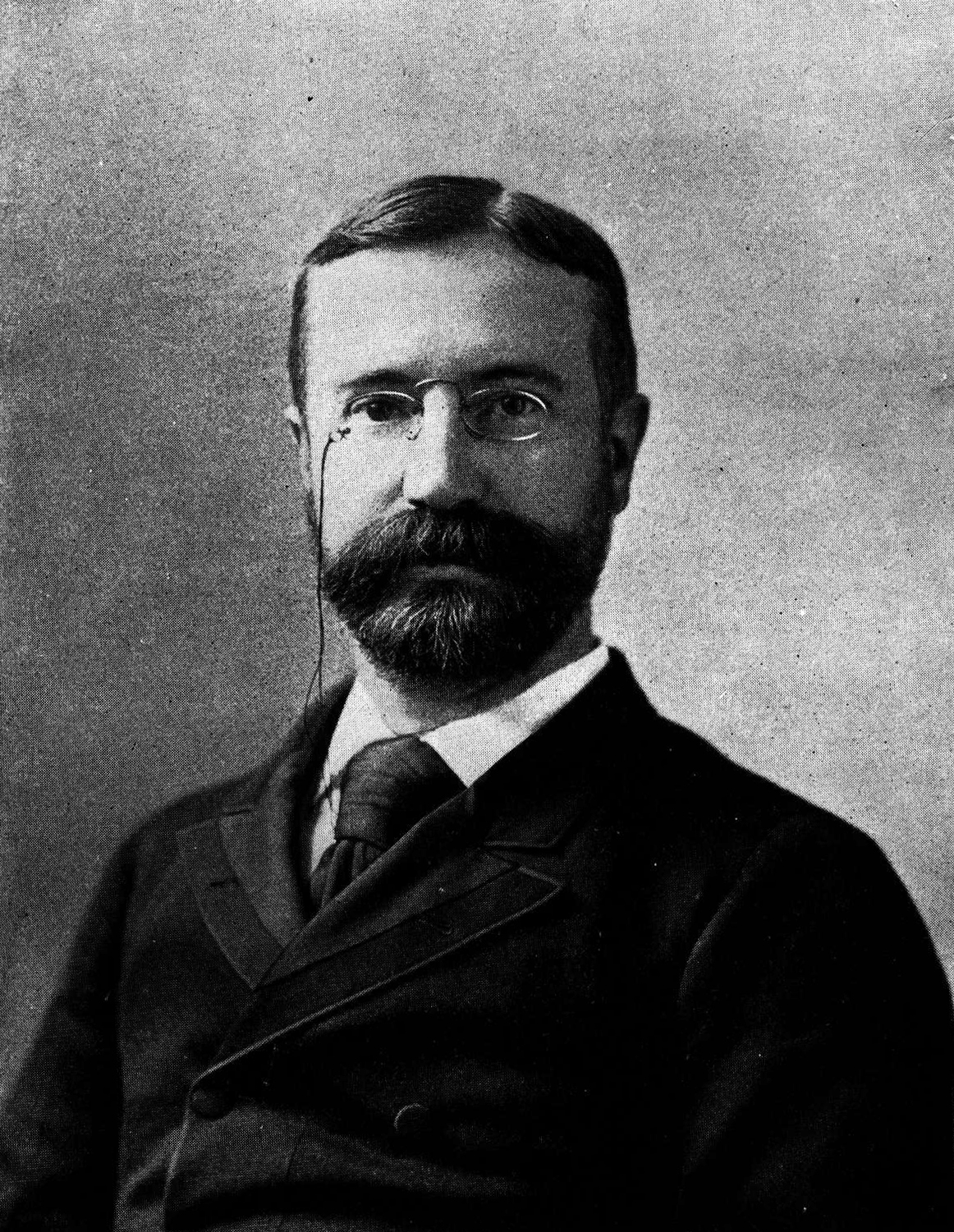
- William Crary Brownell, photographed sometime before 1894.
- Born: August 30, 1851; New York City
- Died: July 22, 1928 (aged 76)
- Spouses: Virginia S. Swinburne (m. 1878) Gertrude Hall (m. 1911)

William Crary Brownell (August 30, 1851 – July 22, 1928) was an American literary and art critic, born in New York City, son of Isaac W Brownell and his wife Lucia E née Brown.

== Biography ==
Brownell graduated from Amherst College in 1871, from where he also later received two honorary degrees. From 1871 to 1879 he wrote for the New York World, and he was on the staff of The Nation from 1879 to 1881. From 1888 until 1926 he was a literary advisor at Charles Scribner's Sons. He published French Traits (1889), an essay in comparative criticism; French Art (1892), classic and contemporary painting and sculpture; Newport (1896); Victorian Prose Masters (1901); American Prose Masters (1909).

Brownell married Virginia S. Swinburne in 1878. Ten years after her death in 1911, he married Gertrude Hall (1863-1961) the writer, poet and translator (not to be confused with Anna Gertrude Hall, the children's writer).

In her autobiography, A Backward Glance, Edith Wharton mentions him appreciatively as one of the finest literary men of his age and a significant contributor to the New York literary scene. His studies of the later English prose writers were highly regarded and deservedly praised; he was elected to the American Academy of Arts and Letters.
