= William Roscoe Thayer =

American author (1859–1923)

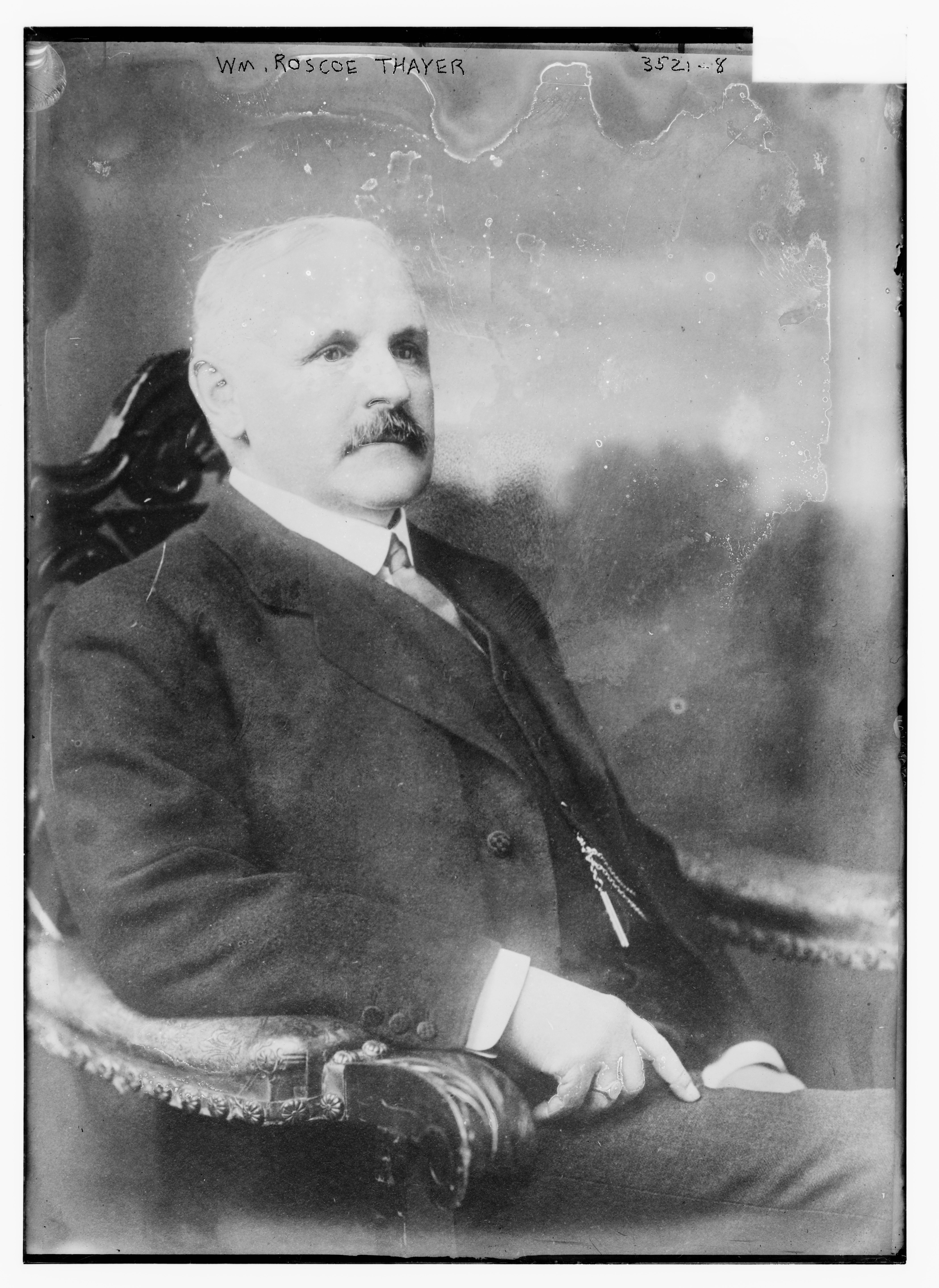

President of the American Historical Association
- In office 1918–1919
- Preceded by: Worthington Chauncey Ford
- Succeeded by: Edward Channing

Personal details
- Born: January 16, 1859 Boston, Massachusetts
- Died: September 7, 1923 (aged 64) Cambridge, Massachusetts
- Education: Harvard University (1881)

William Roscoe Thayer (January 16, 1859 – September 7, 1923) was an American author and editor who wrote about Italian history.

== Biography ==
Thayer was born in Boston, Massachusetts, on January 16, 1859. He studied at St. Mark's Academy, Concord, New Hampshire, traveled with a private tutor in Europe, and graduated from Harvard University in 1881. For several years, he was assistant editor of the Philadelphia Evening Bulletin. He then returned to Harvard, receiving the degree of A.M. in 1886.

He was editor of the Harvard Graduates' Magazine from its foundation in 1892 until 1915. In 1903, at the International Historical Congress at Rome, he represented both Harvard University and the American Historical Association, and in 1906 was their representative at the Italian Historical Congress in Milan. In 1902, he was made Knight of the Order of the Crown of Italy, and in 1917 Knight of the Order of Saints Maurizio and Lazaro. In 1914, he was elected to The American Academy of Arts and Letters and he received honorary degrees from Harvard, Yale, Brown and other universities. Thayer served as a member of the Harvard Board of Overseers from 1913 until 1919. He was also an elected member of both the American Academy of Arts and Sciences and the American Philosophical Society.

He was president of the American Historical Association from 1918 to 1919. He died on September 7, 1923, in Cambridge, Massachusetts.

== Works ==
=== Verse ===
- The Confessiones of Hermes (1884)
- Hesper, an American Drama (1888)
- Poems, New and Old (1894)

=== Prose ===
- The Influence of Emerson (1886)
- An Historical Sketch of Harvard University, From its Foundation to May, 1890 (1890)
- The Dawn of Italian Independence (1893)
- The Best Elizabethan Plays (1895)
- History and Customs of Harvard University (1898)
- Throne-Makers (1899)
- A Short History of Venice (1905)
- Longfellow: Our National Poet (1907)
- Life and Times of Cavour (two volumes, 1911)
- Life and Letters of John Hay (1915)
- Germany vs. Civilization (1916)
- The Letters of John Holmes to James Russell Lowell and Others (1917)
- The Collapse of Superman (1918)
- Democracy: Discipline: Peace (1919)
- Theodore Roosevelt: An Intimate Biography (1919 Grosset & Dunlap)
- George Washington (1922)
