= John Cecil Clay =

American illustrator

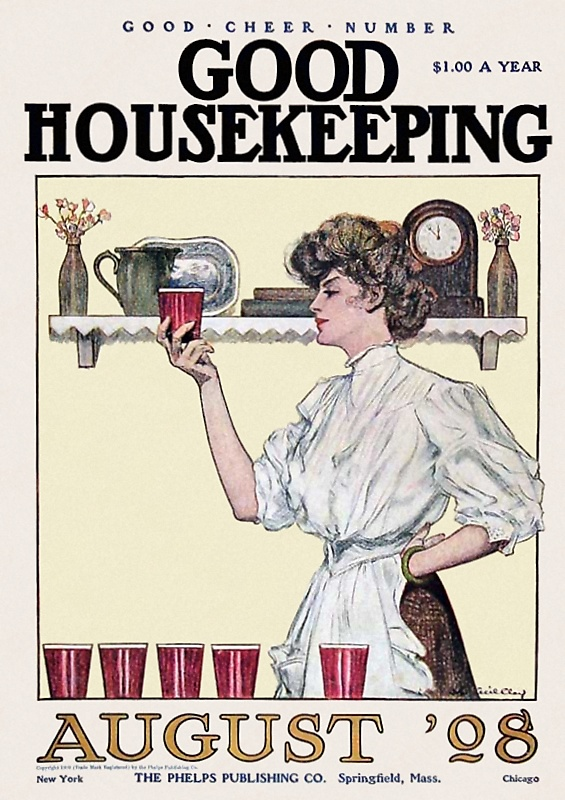
Cover from August 1908.

John Cecil Clay, 1875–1930, was an American illustrator known for genre and caricature paintings.

Clay was born in Ronceverte, West Virginia, to a long-time Southern family. He was a student of Henry Siddons Mowbray at the Art Students League of New York and had a graphic style that was suited to illustration. A recurring subject was pretty young women. During his life he worked for Life and Frank Leslie's Popular Monthly.

He was a member of Society of Illustrators and was represented at the St. Louis Exposition-World's Fair 1904. Apart from the above-mentioned magazines he also worked as an illustrator for The Century Magazine, Saturday Evening Post and Good Housekeeping.
