= Monologist =

Solo artist

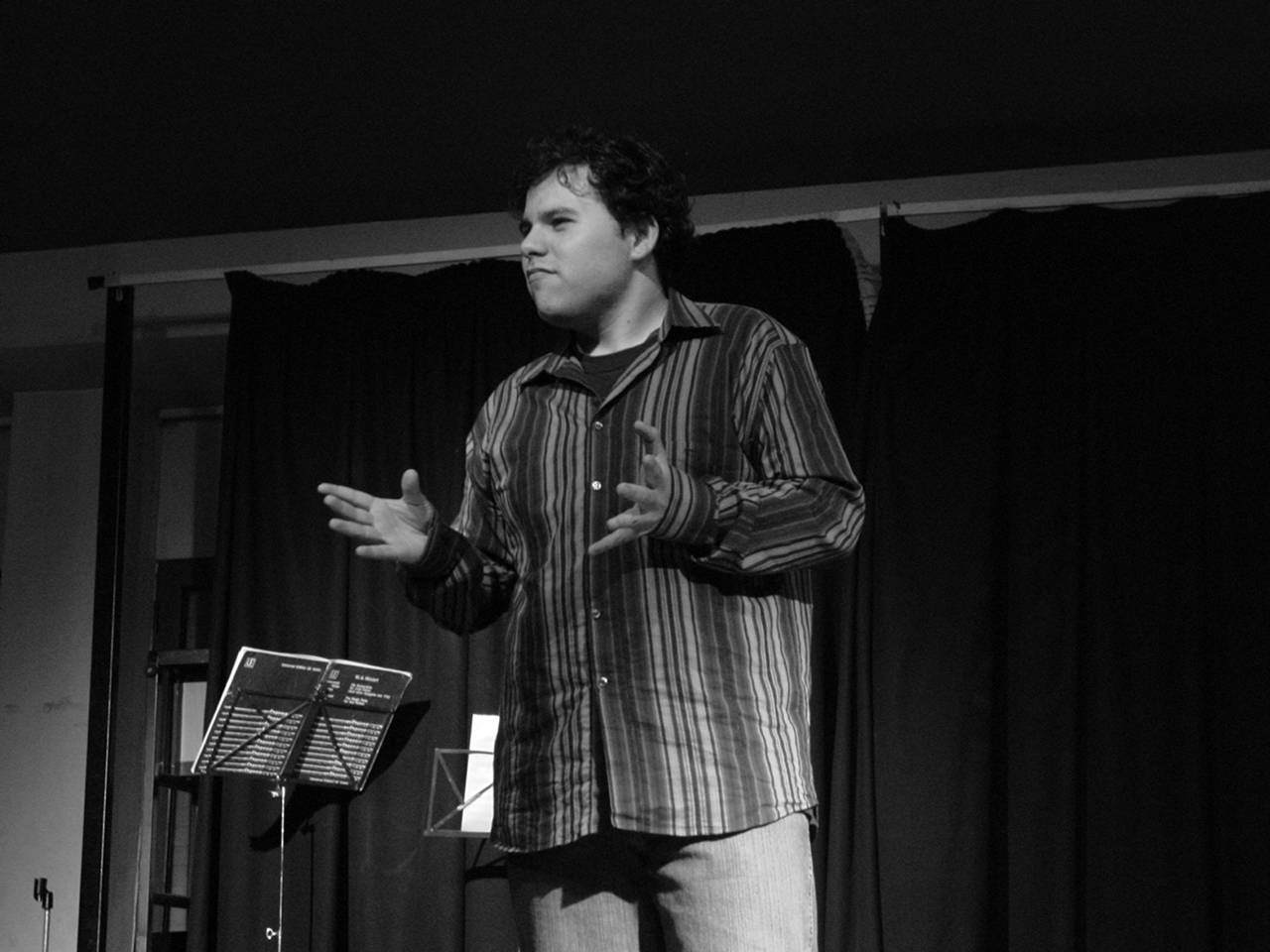
An actor delivering a monologue

A monologist (/məˈnɒlədʒɪst, -ɡɪst/), or interchangeably monologuist (/məˈnɒləɡɪst/), is a solo artist who recites or gives dramatic readings from a monologue, soliloquy, poetry, or work of literature, for the entertainment of an audience. The term can also refer to a person who monopolizes a conversation; and, in an obsolete sense, could describe a bird with an unchanging, repetitive song.

== Dramatic monologist ==
A dramatic monologist is a term sometimes applied to an actor performing in a monodrama often with accompaniment of music. In a monodrama the lone player relays a story through the eyes of a central character, though at times may take on additional roles. In the modern era the more successful practitioners of this art have been actresses frequently referred to by the French term “diseuse”.

== Diseuse ==
Diseuse (UK: /diːˈzɜːz/, US: /diːˈzuːz/) French for "teller", also called talkers, storytellers, dramatic-singers or dramatic-talkers is a term, at least as used on the English-speaking stage, that appears to date to the last decade of the 19th century. The early uses of “diseuse” as a theatrical term in the American press seem to coincide with Yvette Guilbert’s tour of New York City in the mid-1890s. In a February 1896 article on Guilbert, Cosmopolitan Magazine described the term as a "newly-coined and specific title". Diseuse is the feminine form of the French word diseur "teller", a derivative of dire "to say, to tell", which came from Latin dīcere. Few male actors became noteworthy performing solely as a dramatic monologist, though many well known actors have played in monodramas over their careers.

In the December 21, 1935, edition of the Pittsburgh Post-Gazette, an entertainment columnist wrote:

The English language does not contain a word which perfectly describes the performance of Ruth Draper, who comes to the Nixon next Thursday for the first time in several years to give a different program at each of her four performances here. "Speaking Portraits" and "Character Sketches" are the two terms most frequently applied to Miss Draper's work; and yet it is something more than that. "Diseuse" is the French word, but that is more readily applicable to an artist like Yvette Guilbert or Raquel Meller. Monologist is wholly inadequate. The word "Diseuse" really means "an artist in talking" so that may be the real term to use in connection with Miss Draper.

The publication Theatre World wrote in a 1949 piece: "In our time we have fallen under the spell of three remarkable women practising the art of the diseuse—Ruth Draper, Cornelia Otis Skinner, and Joyce Grenfell. Each of these great artists has the gift of crowding the stage with imaginary figures who become so vivid as to be practically visible, but as all of these artists happen to be members of the fair sex it could be assumed that they possess a magic denied the mere male of the theatre." The article suggests that Sid Field was an actor of comparable talents.

Joyce Grenfell wrote in Darling Ma: Joyce Grenfell's Letters to her Mother 1932–1944, "What makes a good diseuse is a capacious verbal (and visual) imagination, and an excellent oral delivery. Call these witty ladies Diseuses of the Heart and Lungs. I do."

In the book The Guest List (2010) by Ethan Mordden, the art of the diseuse is defined as "a speaker of lyrics: in effect, one who uses the music to get to the words".

Actresses who have been called noted diseuses over the years include:

- Lucienne Boyer
- Lina Cavalieri
- Kitty Cheatham
- Ruth Draper
- Marie Dubas
- Odette Dulac
- Joyce Grenfell
- Yvette Guilbert
- Beatrice Herford
- Lotte Lenya
- Dela Lipinskaja, a Russian actress popular in Germany between the wars
- Raquel Meller
- Marjorie Moffett, American diseuse and author
- Corinna Mura
- Marianne Oswald
- Molly Picon
- Françoise Rosay
- Lia Rosen, a Jewish actress (German or Austrian) who began by giving dramatic readings from the Old and New Testaments
- Cornelia Otis Skinner
- Claire Waldoff
- Albertine Zehme, a German actress from Leipzig who was close to Arnold Schoenberg.

== Oral interpretation ==
Oral interpretation, sometimes called dramatic reading or interpretative reading, is the oral staging of a work of literature, prose or poetry, by a person who reads rather than memorizes the material. Typically they are performed by solo artists who – unlike players in a monodrama – do not assume or tell the story through any one character, but do so instead with oral nuances to bring the story alive with their interpretation of how the creator of the piece intended the story to be told.

== Soliloquist ==
The term soliloquist can apply to a monologist reciting a soliloquy, usually from a play, to entertain an audience. Passages in which characters orally reveal their thoughts are probably most associated with the works of William Shakespeare.
