= Ruth Matilda Anderson =

American photographer and cultural historian (1893–1983)

- Born: September 8, 1893; Phelps County, Nebraska, U.S.
- Died: May 20, 1983 (aged 89); New York City, U.S.
- Education: University of Nebraska; Clarence H. White School of Photography
- Occupations: Photographer and Curator of Costumes for the Hispanic Society of America
- Years active: 1925–1979
- Known for: Documentary photography and art history of Spain

Ruth Matilda Anderson (September 8, 1893 – May 20, 1983) was an American photographer and author, known for her ethnographic photographs and studies of mainly rural life in early 20th-century Spain. During her extended field trips to regions of Spain from the 1920s to the late 1940s, commissioned by the Hispanic Society of America (HSA), she took thousands of photographs and accompanying notes on Spanish life and people. This led to her appointment as Curator of Photography at the Hispanic Society in 1922. From 1954 until her retirement, she continued her career as Curator of Costumes at the HSA, authoring books on Spanish historical and folk costumes.

Anderson’s best photographs have been characterized as striking a "balance of objectivity and compassion [...], even when documenting subjects of an anthropological nature." In the 21st century, her contributions to the social history and art historical knowledge of Spain have led to a renewed interest in local history, further publications and public exhibitions in several Spanish cities.

== Biography ==
Anderson was born on September 8, 1893, in Phelps County, Nebraska, U.S., as one of three daughters of Alfred Theodore Anderson of Norwegian origin and his wife Alma Matilda Anderson, née Wickstrom. She began her career in photography under the supervision of her father, who operated a studio in Kearney, Nebraska, with his wife as a partner, specializing in landscape and portrait photography. A member of the National Photographic Association of the United States, he was skilled in making small furniture and constructed his own photographic equipment. After studying fine arts for a year at the University of Nebraska in Lincoln, Anderson changed to Nebraska State Teachers College at Kearney and graduated in 1915 with a certificate to teach mathematics and history. Not interested in teaching, she resumed her former studies at the University of Nebraska, and graduated in 1919.

After moving to New York City, she enrolled at the Clarence H. White School of Photography, the first American institution that taught photography as an art form, with an innovative focus on documentary images. The White School of Photography was inspired by the artistic movement of the Photo-Secession, introduced by Alfred Stieglitz. Trained in such avant-garde methods, Anderson learned how to create images corresponding to the standards of the school, learned how to use complex cameras, special effects with darkroom techniques and developed an eye for effective visual stories.

=== Curator of photographs ===
In 1921, working as an interior designer in New York City, Anderson was hired by the Hispanic Society of America (HSA) at the recommendation of Clarence White himself. Under the supervision of the society's founder and director, Archer Milton Huntington, she improved her skills as a photographer and researcher and was appointed Curator of Photography for the Society's Museum and Library in 1922. There, she started as one of a group of young women in their twenties, who had been hired without specific training for their eventual specialization: Similar to Elizabeth du Gué Trapier, Beatrice Gilman Proske, Alice Wilson Frothingham, Florence Lewis May, and Eleanor Sherman Font, Anderson acquired considerable expertise in the history of Spanish art and civilization through her lifelong activities for the HSA.

Between 1923 and 1930, Anderson made five long trips to Spain, taking documentary photographs and collecting related information for the HSA, mainly in Galicia, Asturias, León, Extremadura and Andalusia. Before setting out, she had started to study Spanish and she continued her studies on a daily basis. Focusing on rural villages and small towns, her images cover many aspects of social life and traditional crafts of the region.

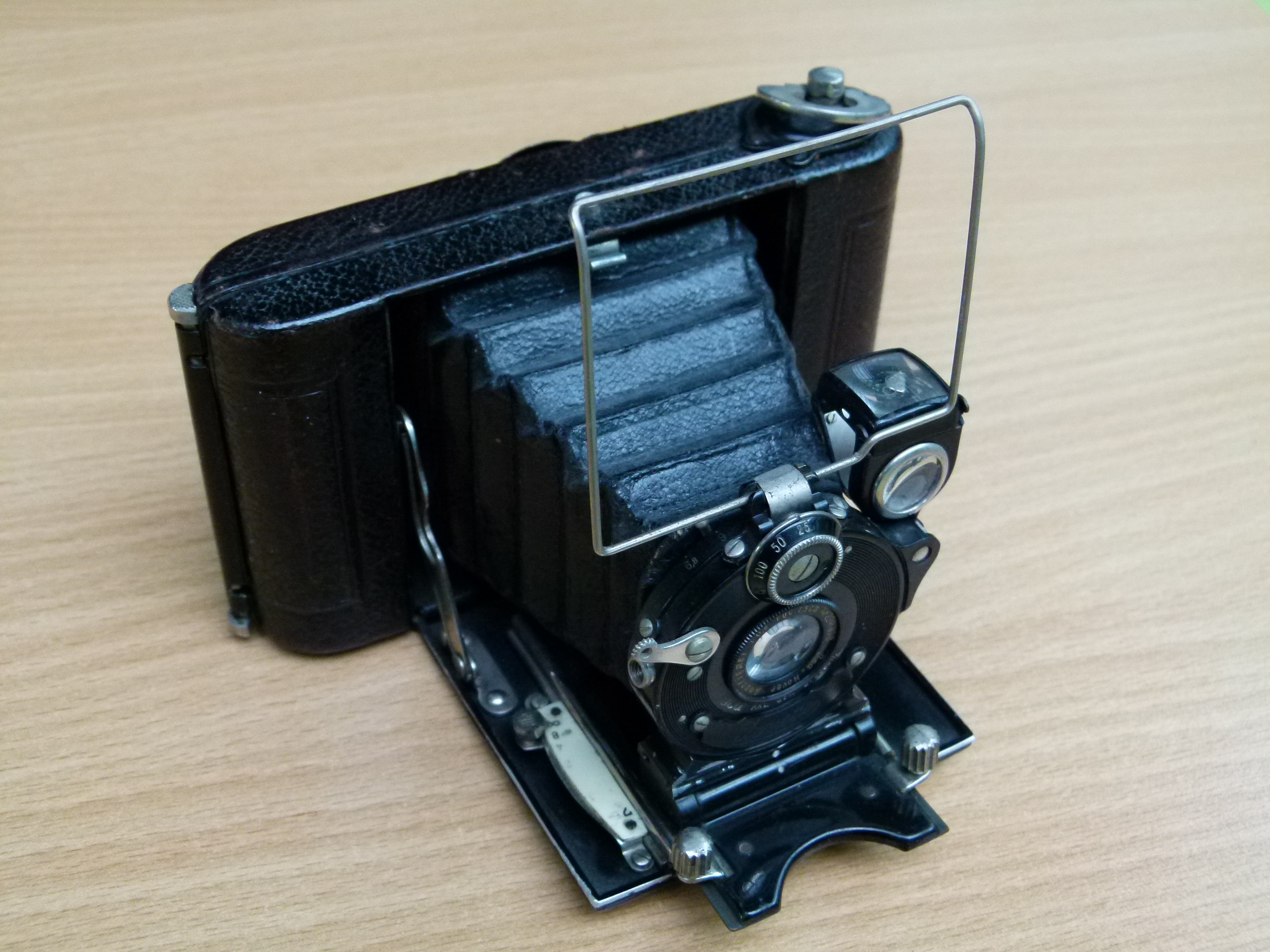
German-built 1920 Icarette camera, similar to the one Anderson used

On her first trip to Galicia in 1924/25, she was accompanied by her father, who wrote a diary taking ethnographic notes for the documentation of her photographs. Aiming to reach even remote villages, they sometimes had to travel on horseback, ferry boats or even on foot. In the inns where they were staying, they improvized a darkroom to develop their films. On later travels, she used an automobile and driver for easier transport of her photographic cameras, tripod, boxes of films and chemicals, as well as her personal luggage.

In total, Anderson took more than 14,000 mostly black-and-white photographs of Spanish people and places, showing men and women at work and doing domestic chores, children at work or playing, and traditional customs. Documenting rural Spanish lifestyles before further industrialization and urbanization and the Spanish Civil War, her images focused on the cycle of life (birth, adult life, rites of passage, festivities and death) and on information gathered from those people Anderson had met.

Anderson recorded a 'timeless' Spain found principally in small towns and rural regions. There she concentrated on old buildings, local industries, and the community’s public life, generally at festivals or religious rites. Significantly she limited herself to those aspects of the individual’s life carried out in public such as collecting water at a well, whitewashing a house, or the exercise of a profession. Stylistically, her pictures present these daily events with a straightforward tranquility while also suggesting an effortless naturalism.

— The Hispanic Society of America,

=== Curator of costumes ===
After her extended work as Curator of Photography, she re-focused her career on studying traditional Spanish costumes and wrote books and articles on the subject. Her last and sixth official mission to Spain took place between December 1948 and May 1949, where she collected information and took photographs for her book Spanish Costume: Extremadura (1951). On this occasion, she also went to Madrid to study historical costumes at the Museo del Pueblo Español (Museum of the Spanish People), the forerunner of today's Museo del Traje (Museum of Garment). In 1954, she was appointed to the position of Curator of Costumes at the Hispanic Society, where she remained until she retired. Her large number of photographs and field notes have been used as sources for scholarly publications by herself and other researchers.

In Spanish Costume: Extremadura, she published her explanations and photographs on the traditional dress and costumes of the Extremadura region. In the preface, she acknowledged "the kindness of townsmen and villagers, of countrymen and shepherds, and of the women, who instantly broke off whatever they were doing to help a stranger."

Her book Costumes painted by Sorolla in his Provinces of Spain presented studies on different ethnic costumes that Spanish painter Joaquin Sorolla had used in his cycle of paintings Vision of Spain. In great detail, she commented on the ethnographic background, referring to local dress and lifestyles, regional Spanish history and literature of Sorolla's paintings. Her book included black-and-white illustrations, showing details of the canvases, as well as accompanying sketches by Sorolla in oil or watercolor from the collection of the HSA, paintings from private collections and oil studies in the Sorolla Museum in Madrid. In a 1958 review, it was called "a useful background for those unacquainted with the intricacies of the Spanish provinces."

Her last book, Hispanic costume, 1480–1530, covers the period of the last decades before the Conquest of Granada and Christopher Columbus' first voyage to the Americas, both in 1492, until after the coronation of Charles V as Holy Roman Emperor. Tracing the historical development of this period of great changes in Spain, the book provides information on secular ceremonial dress for mainly aristocratic men and women, including outer garments and furs, hairstyles, headgear, body garments, leg coverings, underwear, footgear and accessories. For illustrations, Anderson included mainly paintings of the nobility, Portuguese as well as Spanish. Commenting on her research for illustrations of body garments, she wrote: "But as noble gentlemen generally do not reveal their inner garments, illustrations of shirts, doublets, and other details have been taken from figures stripped for action such as executioners, flagellators, soldiers, and farmers." With this book, Anderson provided useful information about historical dress for political, art and literary historians. Also, she wanted "to enable theater designers to proceed in something of the assured freedom with which Renaissance tailors, furriers and shoemakers cut and sewed to please the taste of their clients. In his 1981 review, Joseph R. Jones of the University of Kentucky called Anderson's work an "occasional book by an old-fashioned connoisseur-scholar, whose character is as interesting as the subject matter."

=== Death ===
Anderson died in New York City on May 20, 1983, at the age of 89 and was buried in her family's home town Kearney, Nebraska.

== Legacy ==
=== Collections ===
The Ruth Anderson Collection, which has served as a source for publications on Spanish historical customs, folklore and dress, forms an important part of the archives of the Hispanic Society's Museum and Library. Further, Anderson's portrait of Clarence Hudson White (1919) is held in the permanent collection of the Metropolitan Museum of Art in New York City.

=== Exhibitions and other media ===
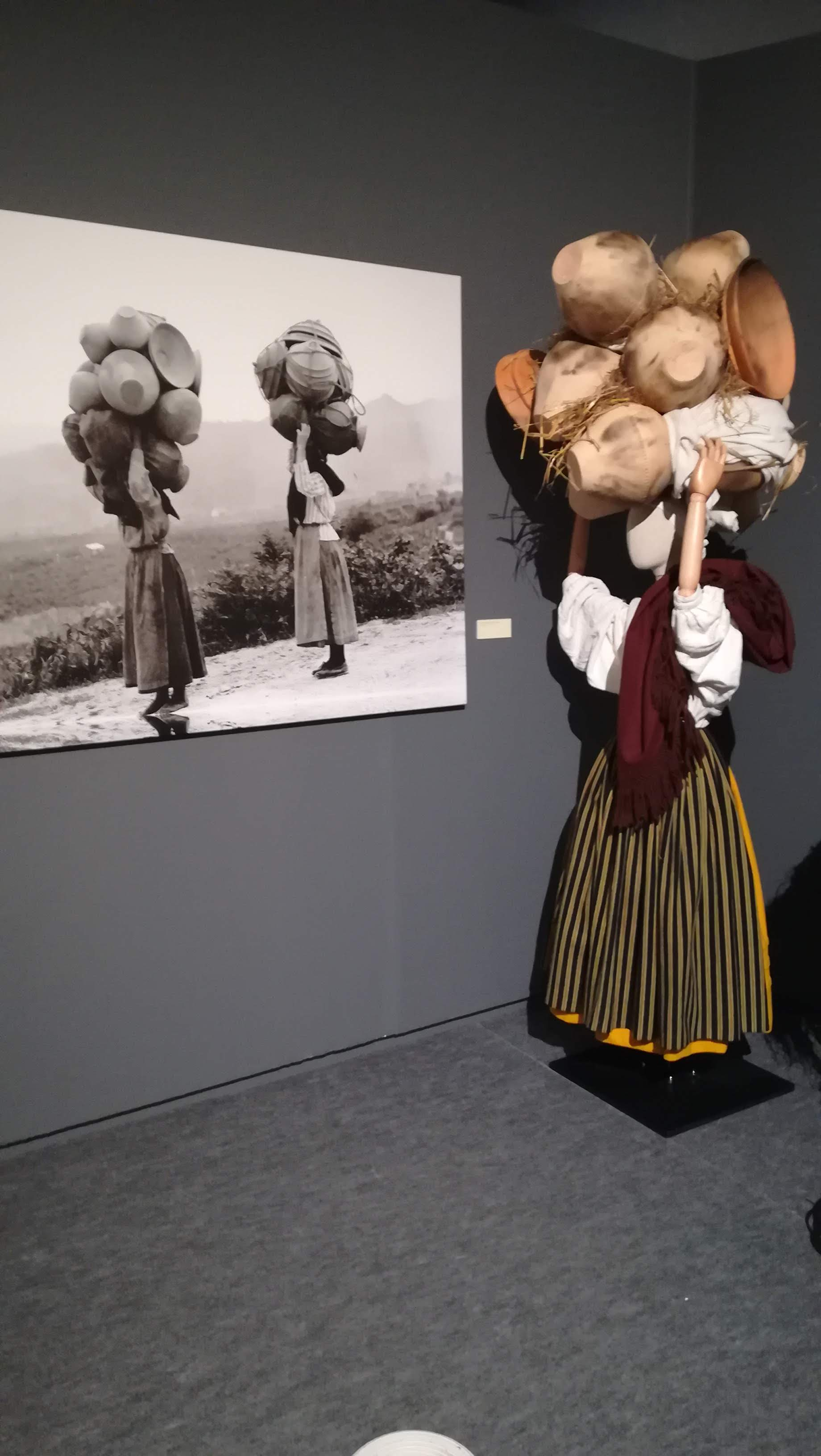
Women carrying ceramic pots to market. Pontevedra Museum.

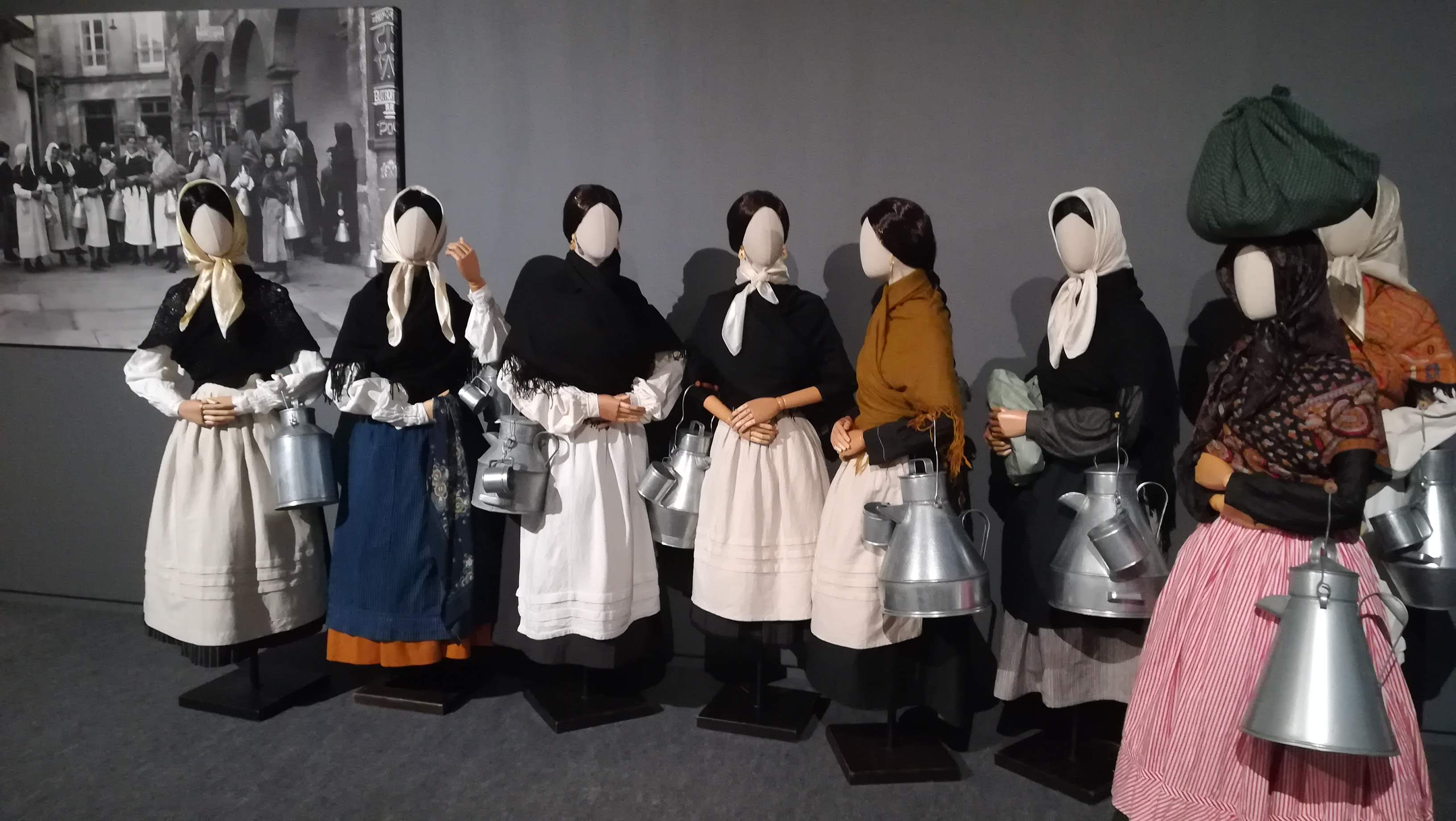
Anderson's photograph and traditional costumes of milkmaids. Pontevedra Museum.

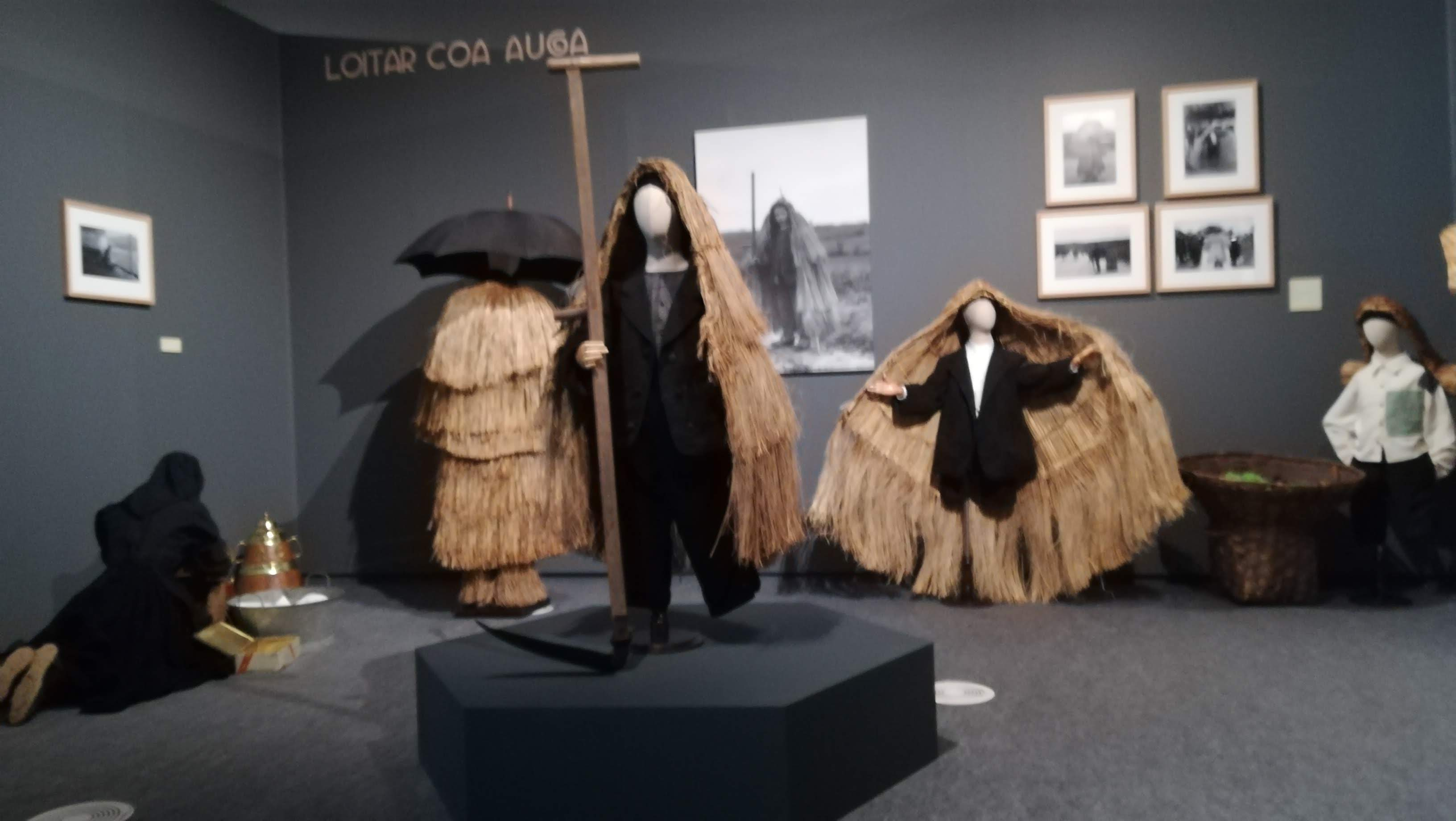
Anderson's photographs and traditional raincoats made from straw. Pontevedra Museum.

Starting in August 2019, the exhibition “A look from yesteryear. Photographs by Ruth Matilda Anderson in Galicia" was shown in A Coruña and in over 35 municipalities of Galicia. In a Spanish study on Anderson's representation of the past and on contemporary popular culture in digital media, her work was referred to as an "exceptional collection of images taken in the 1920s in different parts of Galicia, portraying our people, customs and traditions, an ethnographic legacy of incalculable value." Further, it was one of the most successful exhibitions organized in the city hall to the point that the initial number of scheduled guided tours had to be multiplied by four.

Between August and October 2022, the Museum of Pontevedra held "Ruth Matilda Anderson. A journey through the traditional clothing of Galicia", a temporary exhibition of some 75 traditional Galician folk costumes and crafts, inspired and accompanied by Anderson's photographs taken between 1924 and 1926. After five years of research by the Ethnographic Association of Pontevedra Sete Espadelas, and with the collaboration of the HSA, the exhibition presented a selection of traditional clothing mounted on mannequins and other items of daily life from the association's historical collection as well as reconstructed in historical detail. Dating back almost 100 years, Anderson's pictures and the recreated scenes of rural life showed, among others, milkmaids gathered in Santiago de Compostela's Rúa Nova at dawn, women carrying ceramic pots to market, craftsmen selling wooden clogs and people in traditional raincoats made of straw. An accompanying catalog was published, with all of Anderson's photographs as well as of the costumes shown in the exhibition. It was visited by more than 14,000 visitors, making it the most successful event of the museum in the five preceding years. In earlier years, exhibitions of Anderson's photographs had also been shown in Oviedo, Asturias, and Badajoz, Extremadura.

On 29 October 2022, Televisión de Galicia (TVG) premiered the television documentary series Galicia de 20 a 20, produced with Voz Audiovisual and with the collaboration of the HSA. In this ten episodes documentary, actress Sonia Méndez and photographer Leticia T. Blanco followed Anderson's travels in Galicia and took new photographs similar to Anderson's, while also talking with descendants of people portrayed by her and with craftspeople who continue with the traditional crafts shown in her pictures.

In the 2019 Spanish graphic novel Los cuentos de la niebla (Tales of the fog), some of Anderson's photos of Galicia were reproduced as sources of local life in the 1930s.

== Critical reception ==
The life and work of Ruth M. Anderson and her importance for the ethnographic collection of the Hispanic Society as documents on the history of Spain were discussed in a 2011 Ph.D. thesis in Art History by Noemi Espinosa Fernández at the University of Castilla-La Mancha, Spain, comprising more than 700 pages. Among many other aspects of Anderson's travels as well as visual and written documents, Espinosa Fernández remarked the interest Anderson had shown for the lives of Spanish women, documented in her photographs and notes on women's occupations.

In her study "Spanish popular culture in the photographs of Ruth Matilda Anderson. Representations of the past and digital reinterpretations", Maria Jesús Pena Castro noted that Spanish women were shown by Anderson in active roles as workers, owners of capital and competent decision-makers. According to the study, these visual anthropological representations alter the perception of gender stereotypes by characterizing female participation in both the so-called domestic or reproductive work and in productive work. Further, Pena Castro commented on the gendered construction of space and on women's strategies of occupying traditional masculine spaces, for example, in taverns.

In his introduction to the bilingual catalog of the exhibition In the lands of Extremadura: Ruth Matilda Anderson's photographs of western Spain for the Hispanic Society, Patrick Lenaghan, Head Curator of Prints and Photographs at the HSA, discussed both the underlying assumptions as well as the scope, quality and reception of Anderson's photographs. In Lenaghan's view, Anderson saw her images as mere visual documents of Spain, but the attention they have found after her death through exhibitions and publications have lent another quality to them. This, in turn, led him to inquire about the interpretation of her works: "are they a glimpse of the past, works of art, or visual records of one woman's adventures in Spain? Any answer involves both broad assumptions about the nature of photography and the particular details of her case, above all how her work resembles comparable examples and the context in which she worked. As she shot routine events with a close attention to detail, yet framed them in carefully constructed compositions, she drew on both documentary and artistic traditions."

According to Lenaghan, her photographic work "reflects an unswerving faith in photographs as visual evidence and, in this regard, resembles the motivations behind the formation of several anthropological archives at this time. [...] As a result, the photographs in the Hispanic Society comprise not only an invaluable resource for researchers, but also a significant definition of the nation in pictures. Anderson's work and the entire project of assembling such an archive thus present another chapter in the long running debate of what Spain is with, in this case, a contribution offered up by an admiring outsider."

Further, he wrote that "many of her representations of individuals, particularly those of mothers and children, reflect an engaging and personal sympathy for the sitter. Throughout her work, she responded positively to the Spaniards she met and she imbued her images with a quiet dignity that makes them so impressive."

== Works ==
- Gallegan Provinces of Spain: Pontevedra and La Coruña. New York, The Hispanic Society of America (1939).
- Spanish costume: Extremadura. New York: Hispanic Society of America. 1951.
- Costumes painted by Sorolla in his Provinces of Spain. New York, Hispanic Society of America (1957).
- Hispanic Costume, 1480–1530. New York, Hispanic Society of America (1979).

== See also ==
- National and regional identity in Spain
- Hispanic Society of America
- Galician culture
- Visual anthropology

== Literature ==
- Anderson, Ruth Matilda, Cabo, José Luis and Sandra Sider (1998). Ruth Matilda Anderson: Fotografías De Galicia 1924–1926. New York, Santiago de Compostela: Hispanic Society of America, Centro Galego de Artes da Imaxe. (Exhibition catalog, in Spanish and English) ISBN 9788445321775.
- Anderson, Ruth Matilda and Patrick Lenaghan (2000). Images in Procession: Testimonies to Spanish Faith. New York: American Bible Society, The Hispanic Society of America. ISBN 9781585161102
- Anderson, Ruth Matilda and Patrick Lenaghan (2002). Salamanca, 1928–1930. Fotografías de Ruth M. Anderson. Salamanca: Diputación de Salamanca. [Exhibition catalog, in Spanish and English] OCLC 434443954
- Anderson, Ruth Matilda; Lenaghan, Patrick (2004). In the lands of Extremadura: Ruth Matilda Anderson's photographs of western Spain for the Hispanic Society = En tierras de Extremadura: las fotos de Ruth Matilda Anderson para la Hispanic Society (in English and Spanish). New York, N.Y.: Hispanic Society of America. ISBN 0-87535-156-5. OCLC 60605344. (Exhibition catalog, in Spanish and English])
- Espinosa Fernández, Noemi. (2011) La fotografia en los fondos fotográficos de la Hispanic Society of America: Ruth Matilda Anderson. Universidad de Castilla-La Mancha. Ph.D. thesis (PDF) (in Spanish)
- Espinosa Fernández, Noemi (2018). Hallazgo de lo ignorado: fotografías de Asturias de Ruth M. Anderson para The Hispanic Society of America 1925 (in Spanish). Oviedo: Muséu Pueblu d'Asturies, Museo Casa Natal de Jovellanos, Hispanic Society of America. ISBN 978-84-8367-610-3. OCLC 1103568233.
- Lenaghan, Patrick; Seixas Seone, Miguel Anxo; Villares, Ramón (2009). Unha mirada de antano. Fotografías de Ruth Matilda Anderson en Galicia. (Catalog of Ruth M. Anderson's photographs and travels in Galicia 1924–1926.) (in Galician, Spanish, and English). A Coruña: Fundación Caixa Galicia, in association with The Hispanic Society of America. ISBN 978-84-96982-72-7.
- Ortiz García, C. (2007): "Raíces hispánicas y culturas americanas. Folkloristas de Norteamérica en el Centro de Estudios Históricos", in Revista de Indias vol. LXVII, n. 239, pp. 125–162 (in Spanish)
- Medina Quintana, Silvia (2018). El trabajo rural femenino en la fotografía de Ruth Matilda Anderson: un recurso didáctico para Educación Primaria. DIGILEC: Revista Internacional de Lenguas y Culturas, 4, 69–88. doi:10.17979/digilec.2017.4.0.1868
- Pena Castro, María Jesús. (2020)^{.} La cultura popular española en las fotografías de Ruth Matilda Anderson. Representaciones del pasado y relecturas digitales. (in Spanish) Boletín De Literatura Oral, n.º extra 3 (diciembre): 87–102.
- Rodríguez Álvarez, José Luis; Quiñones Vázquez, David; et al. (2022). Museum of Pontevedra (ed.). Ruth Matilda Anderson, unha viaxe pola indumentaria tradicional de Galicia. (exhibition catalog) (in Galician, English, and Spanish). Pontevedra: Museo de Pontevedra, in association with The Hispanic Society of America. ISBN 978-84-124105-8-7.
