= Beatrice Gilman Proske =

American art historian

Beatrice Gilman Proske,
- Born: Beatrice Irene Gilman; October 31, 1899; Thornton, New Hampshire
- Died: February 2, 2002 (aged 102); Ardsley, New York
- Other name: Bea Proske
- Occupations: Curator, art historian

Beatrice Irene Gilman Proske (October 31, 1899 – February 2, 2002) was an art historian, specifically in Spanish and American sculpture. She was an early employee of the Hispanic Society of America in New York City, with a specialty in sculpture. Her expertise expanded to American sculpture with her work at Brookgreen Gardens in South Carolina, and she died an honorary trustee. Her work also included advising the magazine of the National Sculpture Society. She was the author of preeminent studies on Spanish sculpture and American sculpture.

== Personal life ==
Gilman was born in Thornton, New Hampshire, on October 31, 1899, on a farm to parents Alice May (Hazeltine) Gilman and (Milan) Jeremiah Gilman. She had one older brother. Her early education was in a one-room schoolhouse. She grew up in New Hampshire, but the family moved to Connecticut in 1912. She attended Gilbert High School, where she studied German, French, Spanish, and Latin. She attended Simmons College in Boston, receiving her B.S. in library science in 1920. From 1922 through 1923 Gilman attended the School of American Sculpture.

In 1935 she married Herbert Proske, who was born and raised in Germany. In their marriage they had one child together, a daughter named Cynthia Anna (Proske) Bech on June 14, 1939.

During her life she traveled a lot for her work. In addition, during her life, she had achieved many awards for all the work she had done.

She loved puns and wordplay, including composing some of her own poems, such as "Pride", inscribed on a plaque at Brookgreen Gardens. In her later life, she lived in Ardsley, New York with her cat, "Pretty Boy."

Proske died on February 2, 2002, in Ardsley, New York, at the age of 102 at her home.

== Career ==
=== Hispanic Society of America ===
In 1920, she was hired after an interview with Elizabeth du Gué Trapier as an art book cataloger at the library of the Hispanic Society, without any art experience. In 1922, Archer Milton Huntington, founder of the Society, selected six women, of which she was one, to focus deeply on topics within the Society's collection. He asked if she would focus on sculpture, to which she agreed. He encouraged her growth through annual trips to Spain, as well as lessons in Spanish and sculpture. She went on to catalog the collection of sculpture of the Hispanic Society.

She developed close friendships with Trapier and Alice Wilson Frothingham, two other women hired by Huntington to curate art and ceramics, respectively. They traveled to Europe together. As they began publishing, they styled their writings after Ernest Hemingway.

She was curator of the museum from 1968 through 1969.

Proske held numerous positions at the Hispanic Society, including Chief of Prints and Photographs, Assistant Curator of Sculpture, Research Curator of Sculpture, and then Curator of the Museum. She worked at the Hispanic Society for 52 years, from 1925 through 1973. She was appointed Curator Emerita of Sculpture in 1973, after her retirement from the position in 1972.

=== Brookgreen Gardens ===
Later, after the founding of Brookgreen Gardens, she was encouraged to expand into American sculpture by Huntington. She cataloged the collection of American sculpture of the 19th and 20th centuries of the collection of Brookgreen Gardens, the first garden of American sculpture open to the public. Proske authored a key source of study for American figurative sculpture from the 19th and 20th century works at Brookgreen Gardens.

Specifically, Proske held expertise in the work of Anna Hyatt Huntington, a co-founder of Brookgreen Gardens.

Proske was a board member from 1937 to 1945. During her tenure and beyond, she was the editor and curator of the Garden's publications.

=== National Sculpture Society ===
Proske was an advisory board member of the publication Sculpture Review, published by the National Sculpture Society. She was also a frequent attendee of their annual exhibitions.

== Honors and awards ==
- Member of the Institute of Southern Studies of Spain
- Silver Sorolla Medal,
- The Hispanic Society of America, 1937 Sculpture Medal, The Hispanic Society of America, 1953
- Silver Membership Medal, The Hispanic Society of America, 1970 Honorary Trustee, Brookgreen Gardens, Murrells Inlet, SC, 1978
- Herbert Adams Memorial Medal, National Sculpture Society, 1979
- Inaugural Membership Medal, Brookgreen Gardens, 1987
- American Sculpture Symposium (dedicated to Beatrice Proske), The National Academy of Design, New York, NY, December 4, 1993

== Selected publications ==
The following is a list of Proske's selected publications:

- Gregorio Fernández (1920)
- The Sculpture Catalog of the Hispanic Society (1930–1932)
- Robert A. Baillie Carver of Stone (1946)
- Castilian Sculpture, Gothic to Renaissance (1951)
- Pompeo Leoni (1956)
- Juan Martínez Montañés; Sevillian Sculptor (1967)
- Brookgreen Gardens Sculpture (1968)
