= Clara Louisa Penney =

American curator

Clara Louisa Penney (September 23, 1888 – October 18, 1970) was a curator of manuscripts and rare books for the Hispanic Society of America in New York City.

== Early life ==
Penney was the third child of four, born in Clifton, Maine. She attended Cambridge Latin School at the request of an aunt before enrolling and graduating from Simmons College in 1912.

Penney would return to Clifton in the summertime at her childhood home, gardening, landscaping, and tending for birds. She died in 1970 after a fall left her unable to return to work, and her heart failed after a

== Career ==
After her graduation, Penney worked as a special cataloguer for the libraries of New York, Congress, and institutions such as Harvard, University of Maine, and MIT.

Penney was brought into the Hispanic Society of America by its founder, Archer Milton Huntington, in early 1919. She spent years chronicling the Spanish books and manuscripts for the Hispanic Society of New York. She was sent on trips to Spain by Huntington, to increase her knowledge of the works. She published Lists of Books Printed 1601–1700 in 1938. She continued study, working deeply on the Celestina's early editions.

When Huntington died in 1955, Penney was instructed to open a vault. Opened in 1956, the vault contained many thousands of uncatalogued manuscripts. She labored with the help of Maria Brey and Antonio Rodriguez-Monino to create a catalogue three-volumes long of the 15th through 17th century Spanish poetry.

Penney lectured in Puerto Rico at the Casa del Libro and University of San Juan in 1960, while continuing to mentor students, revise Lists, and write books and articles.

Penney worked at the Hispanic Society for over 50 years until her death in 1970.

== Works ==
- Luis de Góngora y Argote (1561–1627)
- Lists of Books Printed 1601–1700 (1938)
- List of Books Printed before 1601 (circa 1929)
- List of Books Printed 1498–1700 (1965 revision of Lists)
- Celestine: The book called Celestina (1954)
- Album of Selected Bookbindings (1967)

== Awards and membership ==
- Mitre Medal (1937)
- Medal of Arts and Literature (1953)
- Member of The Hispanic Society of America (corresponding, 1924; full, 1939)
