= Giovanni Leardo =

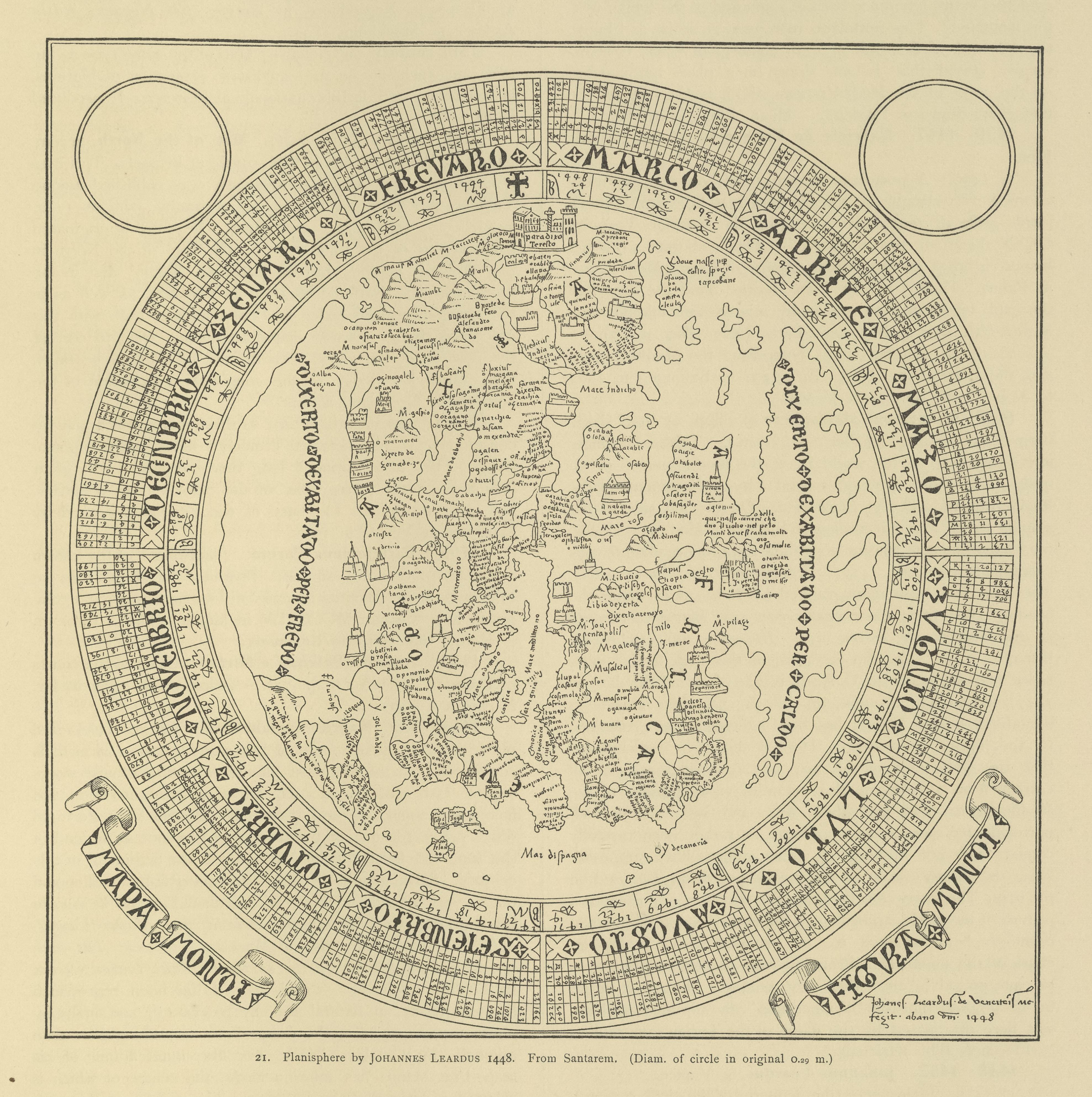
Planisphere by Leardo (1448)

Giovanni Leardo was a 15th-century Venetian geographer and cosmographer. Leardo made at least four mappae mundi, of which three survive today.

Leardo's 1442 map is held at the Biblioteca Communale Library in Verona. A 1447 map does not survive, but a 1448 map is held at the Museo Civico at Vicenza. A 1453 map was donated by Archer M. Huntington to the American Geographical Society, and is the oldest world map in the library there.
