= Elizabeth du Gué Trapier =

American art expert

Elizabeth du Gué Trapier (1893-1974) was an American art historian, born in Washington, D.C., notable for her publications on Spanish art.

== Biography ==
After graduating in library sciences and working for the Library of Congress, she went to New York City in 1919. There, she was one of a select group of women chosen by Archer Milton Huntington to be employed by the Hispanic Society of America. Photographer Ruth Matilda Anderson and art historian Beatrice Gilman Proske were other women working for the Hispanic Society of the time.

During her 40 years as Curator of Paintings, Trapier produced several studies on the history of Spanish art. Her book on Diego Velazquez, published in 1948, was considered a standard work. In addition, she wrote other books, catalogues and articles on other Spanish artists, such as Jusepe de Ribera, Francisco Goya, El Greco, or Juan de Valdés Leal.

== Awards ==
Trapier was awarded Spain's Order of Civil Merit in 1968. Additionally, her years of work at the Hispanic Society led to her receiving the Society's Sorolla Medal. She also received the Mitre Medal.
