= Hispanic Society of America =

Art museum, research library in New York City

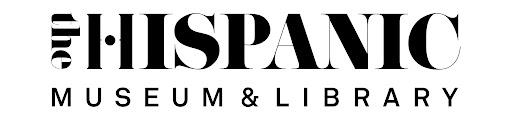

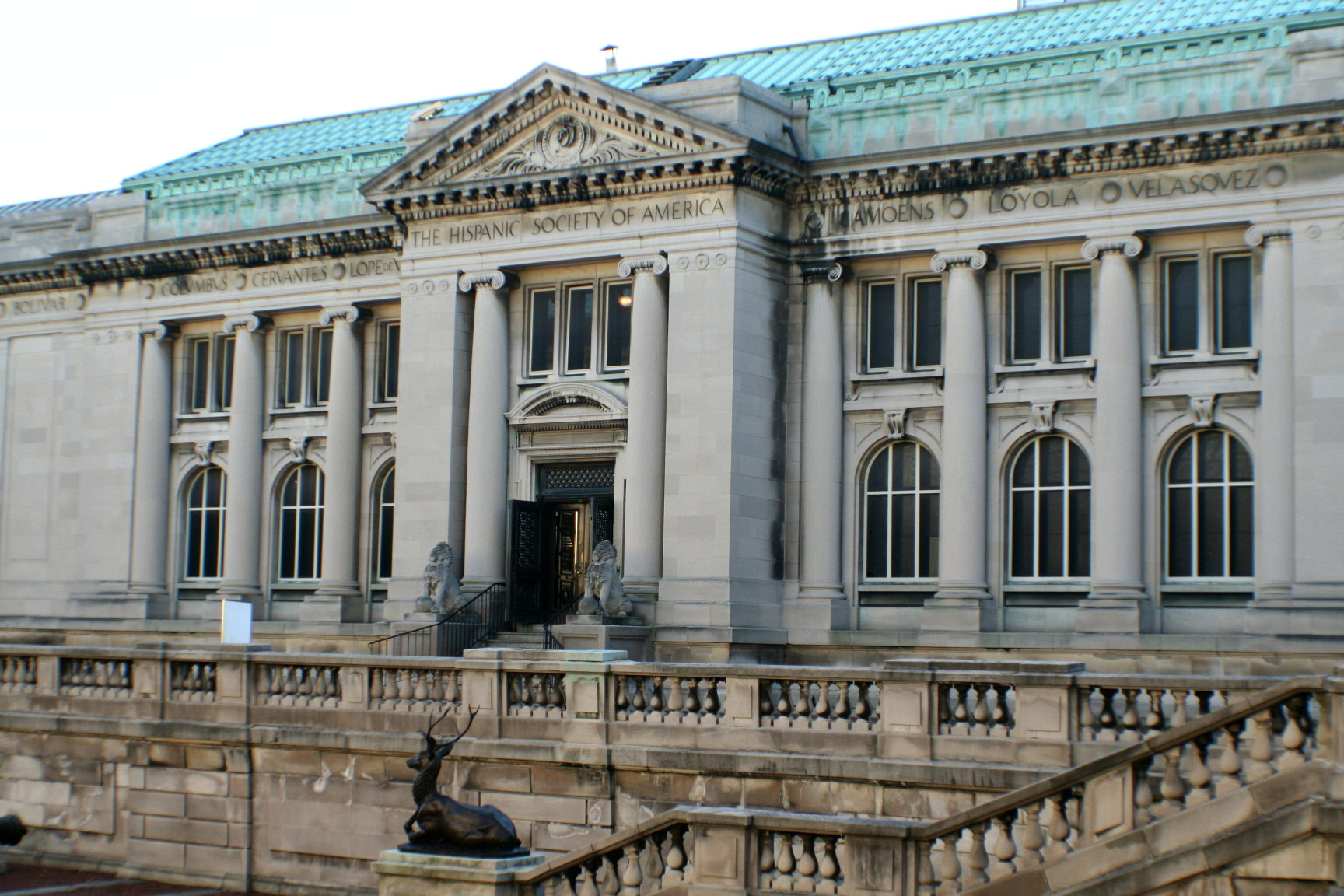
- Hispanic Society museum building on Audubon Terrace

- Location of the Hispanic Society in New York City Hispanic Society of America (New York) Hispanic Society of America (the United States)
- Established: May 18, 1904; 122 years ago
- Location: New York City
- Coordinates: 40.833521°N 73.946514°W
- Type: Art museum Research library
- Collection size: 6,800 paintings 1,000 sculptures 175,000 photographs 250,000 books
- Visitors: 20,000
- Director: Guillaume Kientz
- Public transit access: Subway: at 157th Street; Bus: Bx6, Bx6 SBS, M4, M5, M100
- Website: hispanicsociety.org
- Hispanic Society of America Complex
- U.S. National Register of Historic Places
- U.S. National Historic Landmark
- U.S. Historic district – Contributing property
- New York State Register of Historic Places
- Location: 613 W. 155th St., New York, New York
- Part of: Audubon Terrace Historic District (ID80002667); Audubon Park Historic District (ID100010615)
- NRHP reference No.: 12001009

Significant dates
- Added to NRHP: October 16, 2012
- Designated NYSRHP: June 23, 1980

The Hispanic Society of America, now renamed the Hispanic Society Museum and Library (HSM&L), operates a museum and reference library for the study of the arts and cultures of Spain and Portugal and their former colonies in Latin America, the Spanish East Indies, and Portuguese India. Despite the name, it has never functioned as a learned society.

Founded in 1904 by philanthropist Archer M. Huntington, the institution continues to operate at its original location in a 1908 Beaux Arts building on Audubon Terrace in the Washington Heights neighborhood of Manhattan in New York City. A second building, on the north side of the terrace, was added in 1930. Exterior sculpture in front of that building includes work by Anna Hyatt Huntington and nine major reliefs by the Swiss-American sculptor Berthold Nebel, a commission that took ten years to complete. The Hispanic Society complex was designated as a National Historic Landmark in 2012. In 1997, the museum expanded into the former home of the Museum of the American Indian (MAI), adjacent to the museum's original building.

== Collections ==
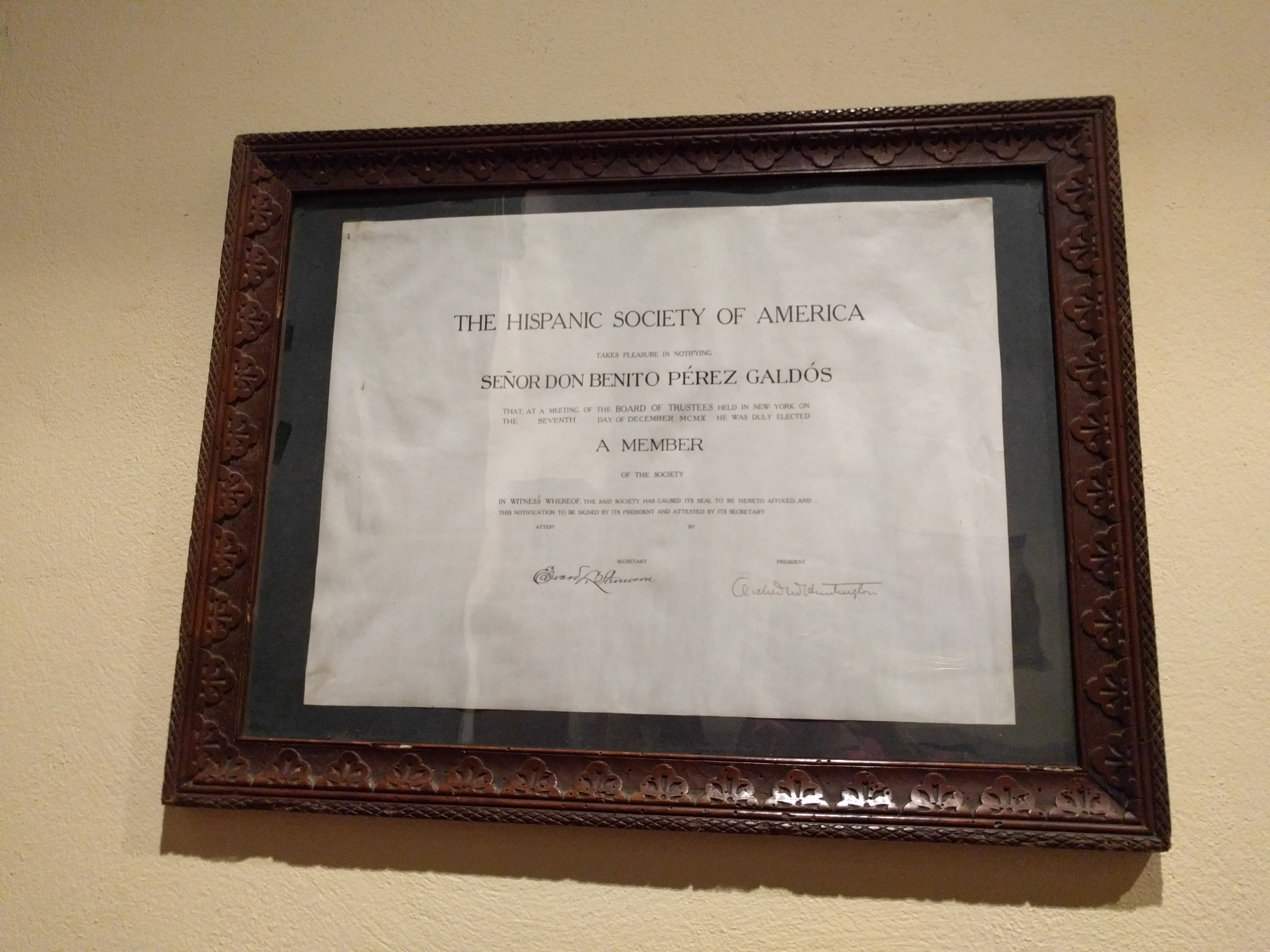
Certificate of membership for Benito Pérez Galdós

The museum contains more than 18,000 works in every medium, ranging from prehistoric times to the 20th century. The collection includes over 900 paintings, featuring important examples by leading Spanish masters, including three paintings by Diego Velázquez, five by Francisco de Goya, and seven by El Greco. Modern works include a large suite by Joaquín Sorolla, a group by Ignacio Zuloaga, and 34 works by the Spanish symbolist Viladrich Vilá, which were all bought by Huntington. It also includes sculpture and architectural elements, furniture and metalwork, ceramics and textiles.

The Sorolla Room, which was reinstalled in 2010, displays Vision of Spain, 14 massive paintings commissioned by Archer Huntington in 1911. Sorolla completed these works from 1913 to 1919. These paintings total more than 200 linear feet (61 m); they ring the large room and depict scenes from the regions of Spain.

The library contains more than 250,000 books; 200,000 documents; 175,000 photographs; and 15,000 prints. The rare books library maintains 15,000 books printed before 1700, including a first edition of Don Quijote. It also holds the manuscript Black Book of Hours, Horae Beatae Virginis Mariae ad usum Romanum (circa 1458), one of only a handful of such works, and the enormous Map of the World (1526) by Juan Vespucio.

The society has been described as "perhaps New York's most misunderstood institution", because it was established to concentrate on Old Spain and its culture in its colonies, as opposed to Hispanic American culture, despite its location in what has over time become a predominantly Hispanic (chiefly Dominican) neighborhood. In 2012 it was suggested that the museum (although not the society) be renamed the "Archer M. Huntington Museum of Art" to clarify this distinction, but the name change was never pursued.

It has been described as an "initially vibrant" institution that "became somber and insular... like some imperious hidalgo citadel cast adrift in time and space." It was also characterized as hostile to Latinx visitors and to the Dominican community. In 1989, the institution's director Theodore S. Beardsley Jr., characterized the local community as possessing a “low level of culture,” and its president George S. Moore described it as “non-taxpaying slums.”

Under director Mitchell A. Codding (1995-2020) the museum, it has been written, "worked hard to transform this image," including an acquisition program that included "savvy purchases of works from Latin America that have broadened the scope of the collection." Codding's purchases were made possible by the sale in 2012-13 of 38,000 Iberian and Spanish colonial coins that Huntington had collected, which were estimated at $25-35 million. In 2025, the museum deaccessioned 45 Old Master paintings, mostly copies and workshop paintings, to benefit collection acquisition and collection care.

Codding supported the exclusion of contemporary art. Senior Curator Marcus Burke spoke positively about the local community, and saw the present-day U.S. Southwest as a proper focus of collecting activities, since it was once part of the Spanish empire.

On the basis of his comments, it was anticipated that the appointment of Guillaume Kientz, Codding's successor, would "accelerate its efforts to become a more community-, Latin American-, and Latinx-friendly institution."

The 2026 exhibition "Sandy Rodriguez: Tierra Insurgente" placed the L.A.based Chicana artist's work "in dialogue with colonial-era cartography, allegories of the Americas, botanical books, and Indigenous manuscripts," in the context of "a history of conquest and resistance." Rodriguez, who uses traditional indigenous materials, makes her own paints, and her hand-crafted objects, which carried anti-colonial messages, were displayed side-by-side with the museum's historical books, maps, globes, and other objects.

== Creation of a historic museum ==
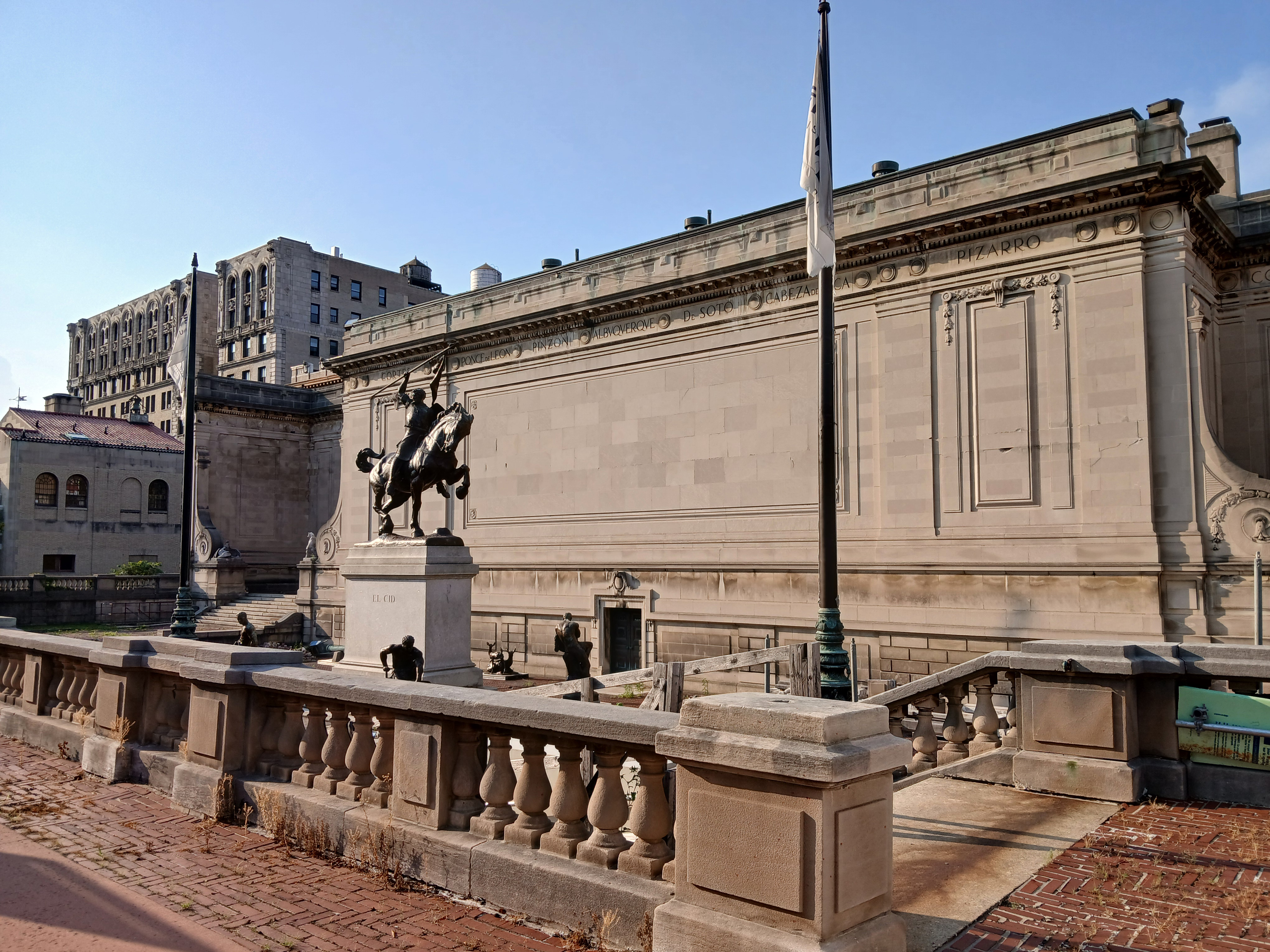
The Hispanic Society's 1930 north building and sculptures

During the late 19th century in the United States, when Manifest Destiny conjoined the Black Legend, attitudes towards Spain were extremely negative, as the U.S. sought to replace Spain as the dominant regional colonial power.

This is mainly due to the fact that during the 16th to 17th centuries, Spain had set its sights on dominating most of North and South America. Therefore, by the 18th century, the United States viewed Spain as an enemy that must be dealt with in order to move forward with American success in North America. During the 19th century, many areas once under Spanish control in North America were added to the territories of the United States. By the turn of the 19th century into the 20th century, Hispanic and Latin American studies became more pronounced in the scholarly world in the United States. Huntington's Hispanic Society of America was one of the leaders in the movement to bring Hispanic art to the attention of scholars in order to introduce the concept that Hispanic art was worthy of study. People started to realize that learning about Hispanic culture was important because it was such a large part of American history. Huntington had the foresight to see how important this kind of museum would be and established the museum in 1904.

Huntington worked diligently in collecting a vast amount of Hispanic books, documents, artifacts, and art. He was not primarily an art collector: he distrusted art dealers and did not want to spend lavishly on art (his mother Arabella Huntington, who was one of the Gilded Age's biggest spenders, bought the two most expensive paintings). He had only 23 paintings (most of them insignificant) when the society was founded. Artist-advisors helped him select Old Master paintings, and today the Spanish Golden Age paintings are regarded as one of the better collections of this material in the U.S.

Huntington collected Hispanic heritage objects, manuscripts, and around 40,000 rare books. The library's foundation was made in 1902, when he bought the best private library in Spain, which belonged to the Marquis of Jerez de los Caballeros in Seville. Huntington then engaged the Leipzig-based book dealer Karl W. Hiersemann to assemble library materials for him to purchase. Today the library has 300,000 books and periodicals and 220,000 manuscripts and documents.

The library is a resource for scholars who study Hispanic history, literature, art, and culture to this day. Hence, his idea for the institution was not narrowly for showing paintings, sculptures, and historical artifacts, but more widely for it to be used as a center for research and scholarly study.

As for the design of the building, Huntington had a large role in the design and creation of the institution itself. The main building was based on the designs of Huntington's cousin, Charles P. Huntington. The chosen neoclassical design of the complex was designed to become the reputable institution that the Hispanic Society of America is today. Huntington conceived of Audubon Terrace as a substantial complex of cultural institutions, which was partially realized. He had a direct role in founding 14 cultural institutions, and he provided funding for a number of them to be housed at Audubon Terrace.

== Dia at the Hispanic Society of America ==
Between 2007 and 2011, the Dia Art Foundation commissioned several projects at the Hispanic Society's Building on West 155th Street. These commissions were by Francis Alÿs, Dominique Gonzalez-Foerster, and Koo Jeong A. A weekly event called "Tuesdays on the Terrace" was also organized by Dia over these years presenting public outdoor programing of dance, music, and poetry.

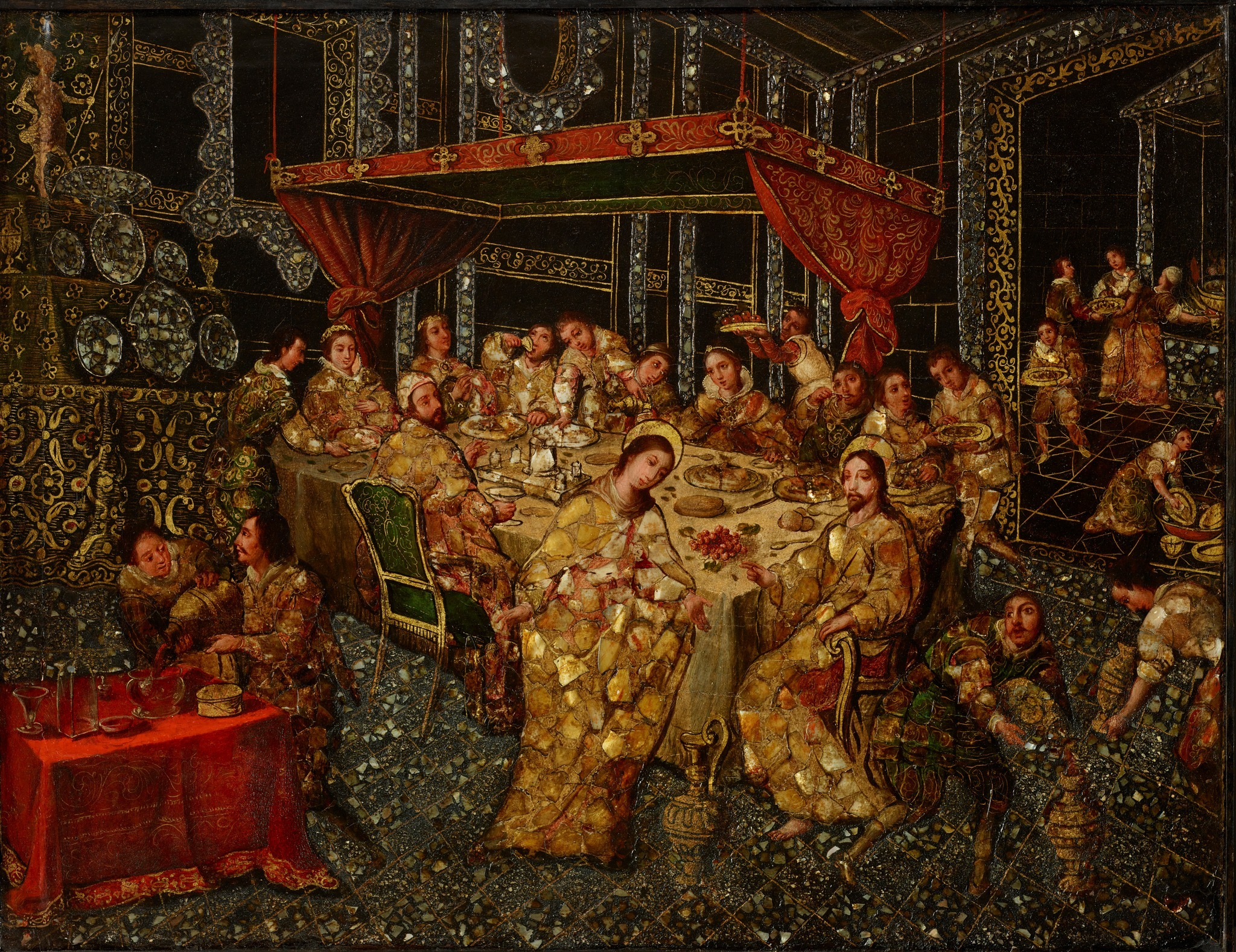
A 1693 enconchado painting depicting the Wedding at Cana is among the museum's collections

== Expansion and renovations ==
In April 2015 the society announced the appointment of Philippe de Montebello to chair the society's Board of Overseers and spearhead a major effort to roughly double the museum's size by renovating the vacant Beaux Arts building adjacent to the society's original museum building. It was formerly the home of the Museum of the American Indian (MAI), which Huntington had brought to Audubon Terrace. The museum was absorbed by the Smithsonian Institution in 1990, and its main facility built on the mall in Washington, D.C. It also operates an outpost in the Alexander Hamilton U.S. Custom House in lower Manhattan (a condition mandated by New York as a condition of permitting the merger and move to D.C.), and a storage facility in Maryland. The Hispanic Society bought the MAI building in 1996 for $2.1 million.

Beginning January 1, 2017, the museum was closed for extensive renovations, although the library was open on a limited basis by appointment only. The $15 million project replaced the building's roof and lighting. Originally scheduled to reopen in the fall of 2019, progress was delayed, with the new East Building Gallery, formerly the Museum of the American Indian, opening in 2021 for rotating exhibitions, followed by a general reopening in June 2023.

While the museum was closed, many of its works were lent to other institutions. About 200 of the society's most important works were displayed from April through September 2017 at the Museo del Prado in Madrid. The exhibit traveled to the Museo del Palacio de Bellas Artes in Mexico City from June through September 2018; the Albuquerque Museum of Art and History, November 2018 through March 2019; the Cincinnati Art Museum, October 2019 through January 2020; and the Museum of Fine Arts, Houston from March to May 2020. There was also a major exhibition in London in 2023.

Admission to the museum has always been free, in accordance with Archer Huntington's trust. Due to financial difficulties, the society went to court in 2016 in order to be allowed to charge an admission fee to temporary exhibitions to be held in the museum's new facility, while keeping the main hall free. As of 2022, admission to the new galleries is free.

In 2020 the museum appointed Guillaume Kientz, former curator at the Louvre and the Kimbell Art Museum, as its new director.

In 2026, the Society and the Generalitat Valenciana announced plans for the Society to establish an outpost in Valencia. "The Hispanic Society of America – Colección Sorolla will exhibit more than 220 pieces on loan from the Hispanic Society’s renowned collection of work by Valencian painter Joaquín Sorolla." The works will initially be shown in Valencia’s City Museum (Museo de la Ciudad) before moving to the Palacio de las Comunicaciones.

=== Unionization and strike ===
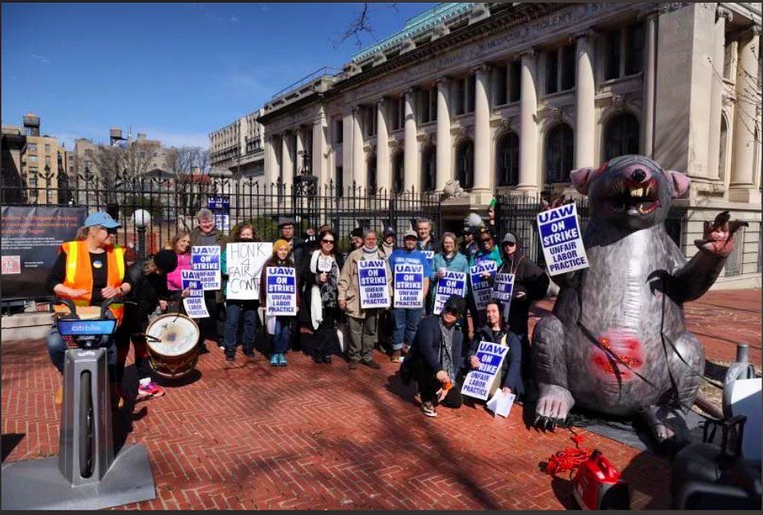
Hispanic Society Union on Strike

In May 2021, workers at the museum filed their intent to unionize with the National Labor Relations Board, joined local 2110 (the Technical, Office, and Professional Union) of the United Automobile Workers, and began contract negotiations with the museum. In February 2023, the staff sent an open letter containing a list of complaints to the museum's board of trustees. On March 27 the workers authorized a strike in response to the museum's planned reopening. The current contract removed coverage for health insurance premiums and deductibles. The union stated that proposed salary increases would not offset the costs of the loss of benefits and that the administration had left the museum short-staffed and the collection in jeopardy due to a lack of safeguards. The union asked for minimum salaries for union positions on par with other museums in the city, guaranteed future wage increases, a retroactive wage increase, and restoration of health care coverage. On May 19, the workers ended the strike after ratifying a contract with the museum. The two-and-a-half-year contract entailed raised salaries, a 403(b) plan, and preserved fully-paid health benefits. It also established severance pay, and professional development funds.

== Buildings ==
The Hispanic Society occupies three buildings surrounding a multi-tiered plaza, which is accessed from Broadway.

=== Main building ===
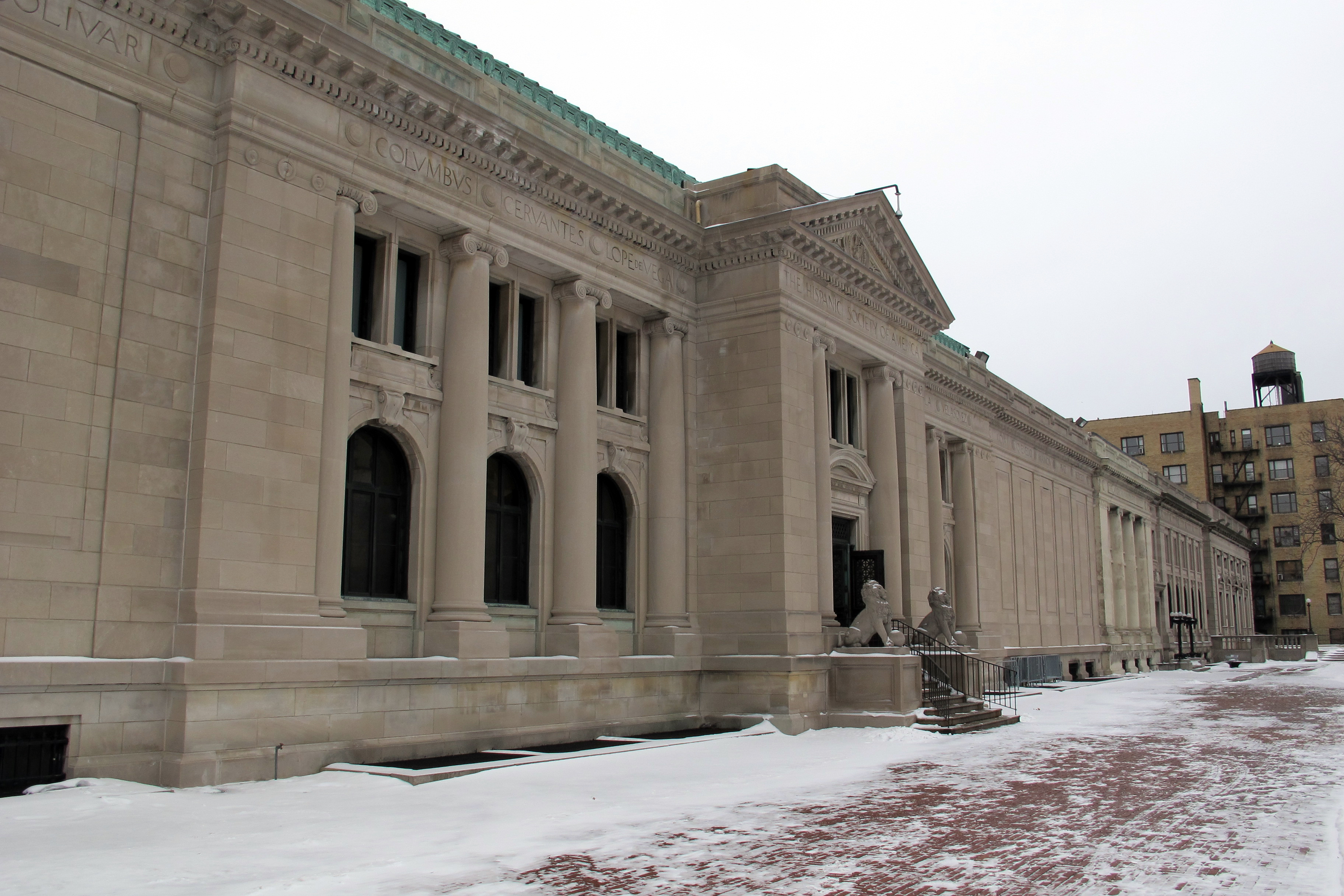
The northern elevation of the Hispanic Society's main building, seen in winter

The Hispanic Society's main building, a two-story structure at 613 West 155th Street, was the first built in the complex. As such, its exterior design influenced those of the complex's other buildings. Charles Huntington's original edifice dates from 1907 and measures seven bays wide on its northern and southern elevations. The original section is flanked by a west wing added by Charles in 1915 and an east wing added by Erik Strindberg in 1921, both extending five bays wide. The original section is designed primarily in the Renaissance Revival style, although some interior elements are influenced by Spanish architecture. The additions have similar neoclassical motifs to the original section, albeit with less detailing. All the sections are made of brick, masonry, and steel.

The facade bears the names of notable cultural figures of Spanish descent or origin, including the conquistadors. The original section's northern elevation has an Ionic colonnade of double-height bays with arched first-story windows and paired second-story windows; the center bay protrudes from the facade and has a short stair leading to a doorway. The entrance stair is flanked by lions designed by Anna Huntington. There is an elaborate pediment above the doorway, along with a tympanum depicting a Spanish caravel or ship. Originally, the doorway had a pair of bronze doors from a mosque in Cairo. These have been replaced with double doors designed by Berthold Nebel, which were completed in 1939 after ten years of work; Nebel's doors consist of nine 5-by-11-foot (1.5 by 3.4 m) relief panels. Above the second story is an entablature, which contains a frieze with some Spanish figures' names, along with a cornice of dentils and modillions. A copper-crested parapet runs above the cornice.

The original section's southern elevation on 155th Street has no doors or windows. There is an arcade of pilasters in the Ionic order, spanning nine bays wide. The original southern elevation has carved reliefs representing Iberian Peninsula civilizations, installed in 1939 and designed by Nebel. The annex's bays are flanked by pilasters rather than columns, the wall openings are filled with ashlar panels, and the roofs are flat. Additional names are inscribed in the bays of the annexes' southern elevations.

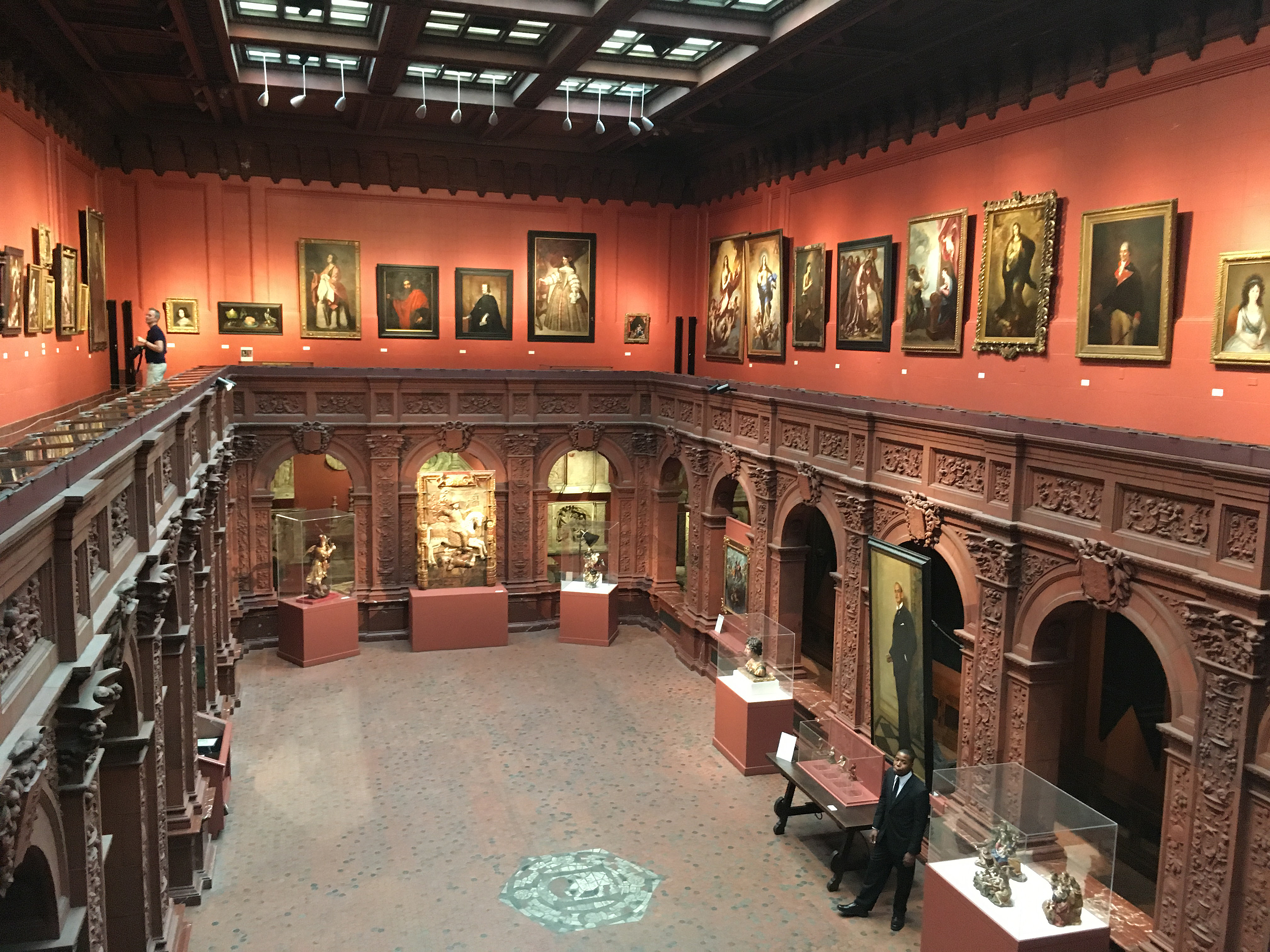
Interior of the central court

The interior spaces are decorated with tiles and mosaics from various eras. The main entrance leads to a hallway flanked by ornate staircases. The primary interior space is a central court, originally a reading room. Measuring 98 by 40 feet (30 by 12 m) across by 35 feet (11 m) high, it is designed in the style of a Spanish house's patio and has a gallery level, with large archways supported by terracotta pillars. The court also has illuminated tables, chairs, and a conveyor belt system that transports books from the basement. The spaces under the galleries were originally used as various exhibition spaces, and their walls have paintings of notable Spanish figures by Francis Lathrop.

Other parts of the interior were originally devoted to painting and sculpture galleries. The west wing contains the Sorolla Room, which has a mural series, Provinces of Spain by Joaquín Sorolla, on its walls. The 230-foot-long (70 m) mural series, depicting Iberian topics, dates from 1919–1920. The room itself, originally intended as the "Chamber of the Hundred", was furnished with Spanish marble floors and Spanish wood furniture; it is used as a gift shop. The east wing includes a smaller reading room with tile floors, woodwork, neoclassical piers, and galleries surrounding a skylit central area. As built, the east wing had storage and sales areas as well, and the basement was also used for storage.

=== Library ===
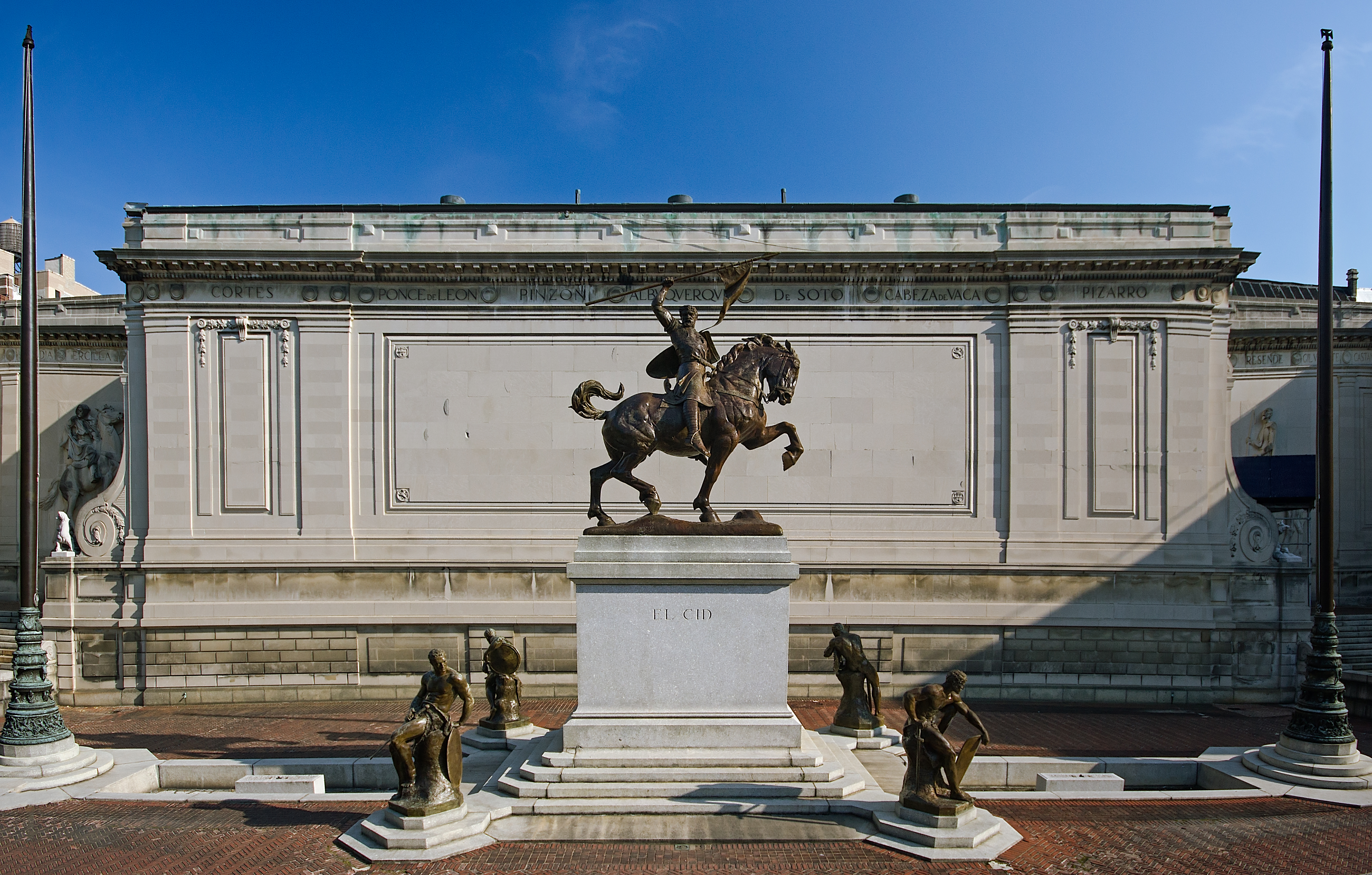
The Hispanic Society Library's southern elevation, with El Cid Campeador in front of it

The Hispanic Society Library, designed by H. Brooks Price, opened in 1930. It was built on the site of an entrance to Audubon Terrace that formerly existed on 156th Street (see Audubon Terrace § Plaza). The building measures eight stories high and 90 by 25 feet (27.4 by 7.6 m) across, with the longer dimension extending along 156th Street. Standalone "wing walls" extend along the street west and east of the building.

The southern elevation, facing the complex's southern courtyard, is a neoclassical Indiana limestone design. It lacks window openings because of the presence of storage areas inside and because it was intended as a background for the plaza's sculptural group. This elevation contains a protruding central section with a center panel and volutes on either side; it is ornamented with animal groups sculpted by Anna Huntington in 1933–1936. These are flanked by the recessed wing walls, which also have panels. The wing walls have two carved reliefs of equestrian figures by Anna: Don Quixote (1942) and Boabdil (1943–1944). Below these reliefs are inscriptions excerpted from two of Archer Huntington's poems.

From the courtyard, there are entrances on the central section's western and eastern elevations, as well as three infilled window openings. The northern, or 156th Street, elevation of the facade is made of brick. This elevation has limestone trim and includes several tiers of small windows and a bronze door. There are two arts and crafts exhibit rooms inside, which are decorated with wooden wall panels and are situated on the first floor. The rest of the interior houses the library stacks.

=== Museum of the American Indian annex ===
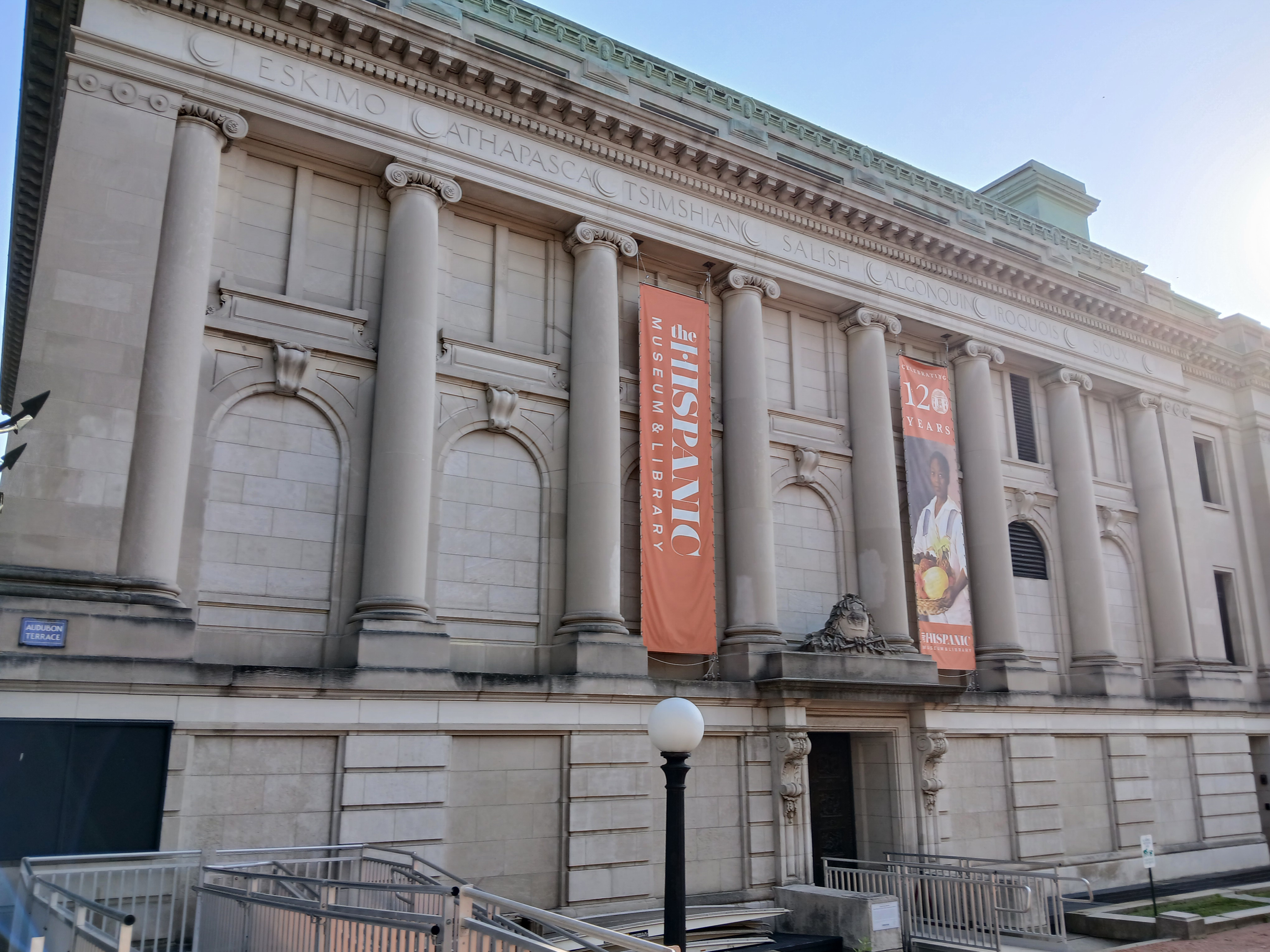
The MAI building's northern elevation, seen from the lower plaza

The MAI building (now Hispanic Society annex) is located at 3741 Broadway, just east of the Hispanic Society's original building, at the southeast corner of the complex (at 155th Street and Broadway). It was designed by Charles Huntington and opened in 1922. The three-story building is designed in the Italian Renaissance Revival style, duplicating the American Geographical Society (AGS) building immediately to the north. Like the AGS building, the northern and southern elevations are eleven (originally seven) bays wide.

The facades have a rusticated base, above which are double-height bays with first-story arches and second-story openings flanked by Ionic engaged columns. The windows on these levels have been mostly filled in. The base's southern elevation has a fire exit door. Above the second story is an entablature, which has a frieze wrapping around the building; the eastern elevation contains the name Museum of the American Indian–Heye Foundation, while the northern and southern elevations bear the names of Native American tribes. The frieze is topped by a cornice with dentils or modillions. A copper-crested parapet with inset attic windows runs above the cornice. The building has a copper roof.

As built, the structure hosted study collections in the basement, exhibition rooms on the first to third floors, and offices on part of the first floor. The interior retains little of its original decoration, except a staircase to the west. Doorways lead west to the Hispanic Society's main building.

== Notable people ==
- Georgiana Goddard King (1871–1939), Hispanist and medievalist
- Mildred Stapley Byne (1875–1941), early curator of architecture and applied arts
- Clara Louisa Penney (1888–1970), early curator of rare books and manuscripts, Society member
- Florence Lewis May (1899–1988), early curator of textiles
- Elizabeth du Gué Trapier (1893–1974), early curator of paintings and drawings
- Alice Wilson Frothingham (1902–1976), early curator of ceramics
- Beatrice Gilman Proske (1899–2002), early curator of sculpture
- Eleanor Sherman Font (1896–1982), early curator of prints
- Ruth Matilda Anderson (1893–1983), early curator of photographs and curator of costumes

== Gallery ==
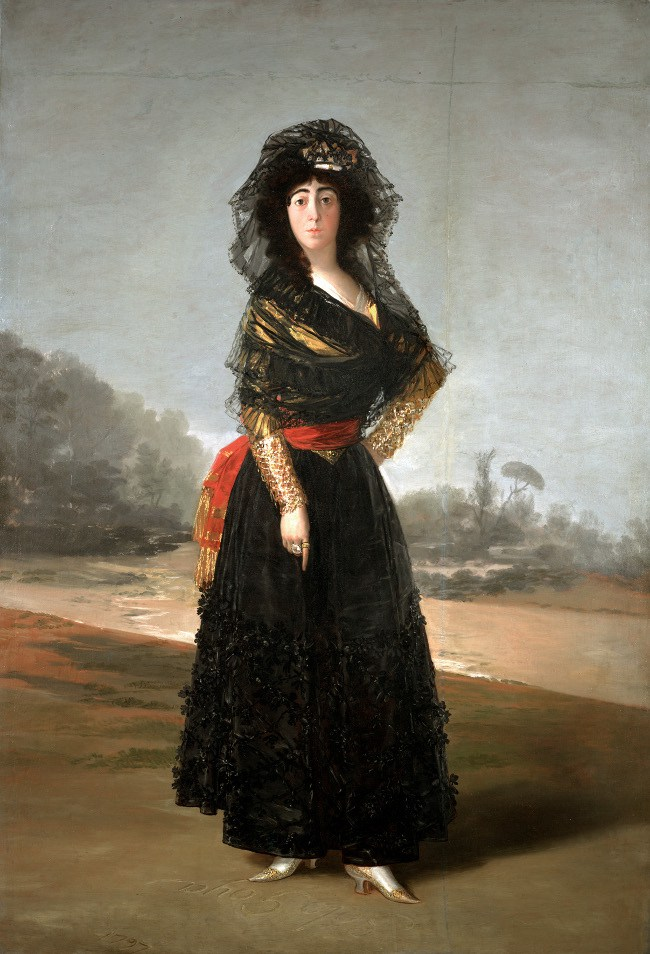
The Duchess of Alba ,Francisco Goya, 1797

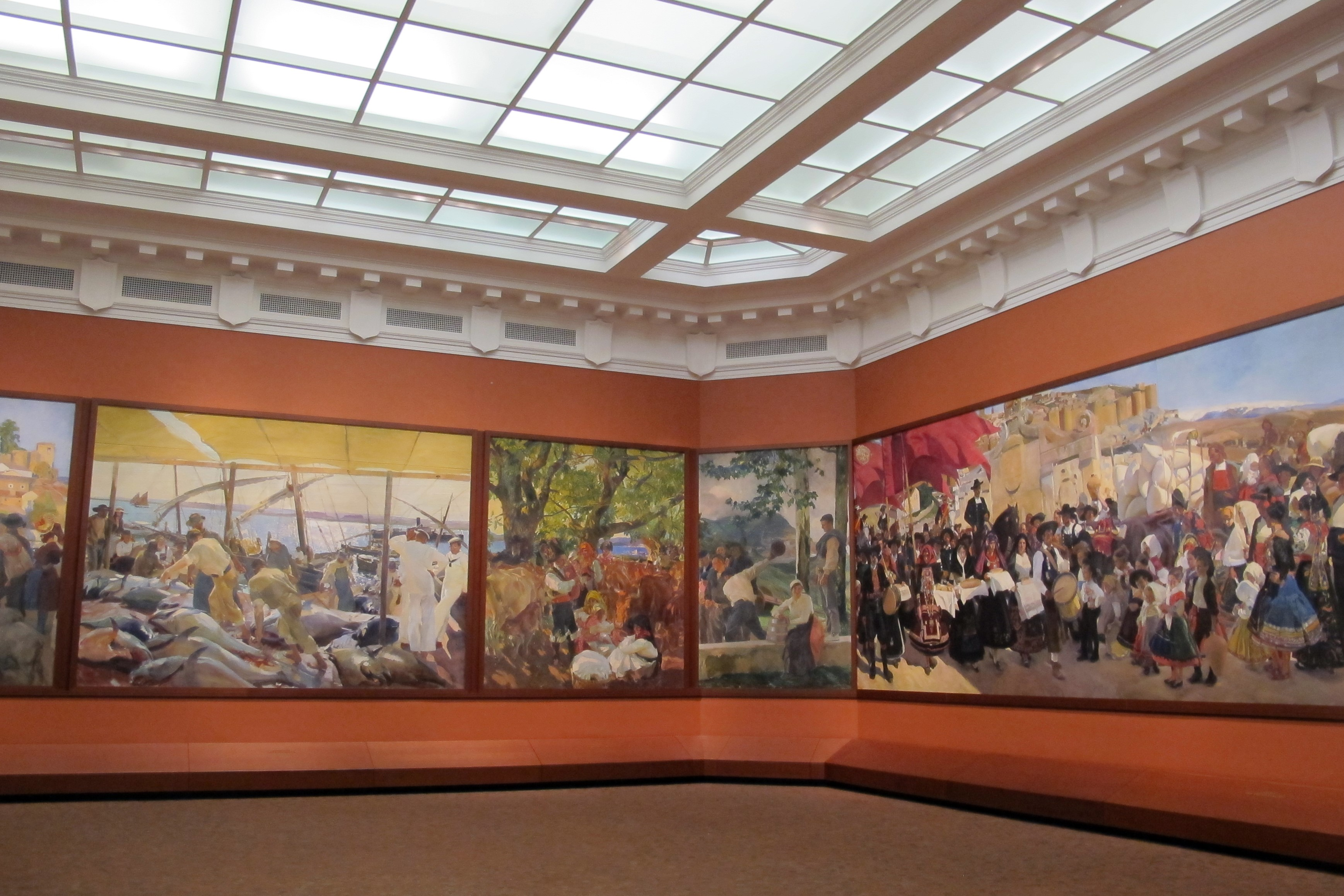
Vision of Spain, Joaquín Sorolla, 1913-19

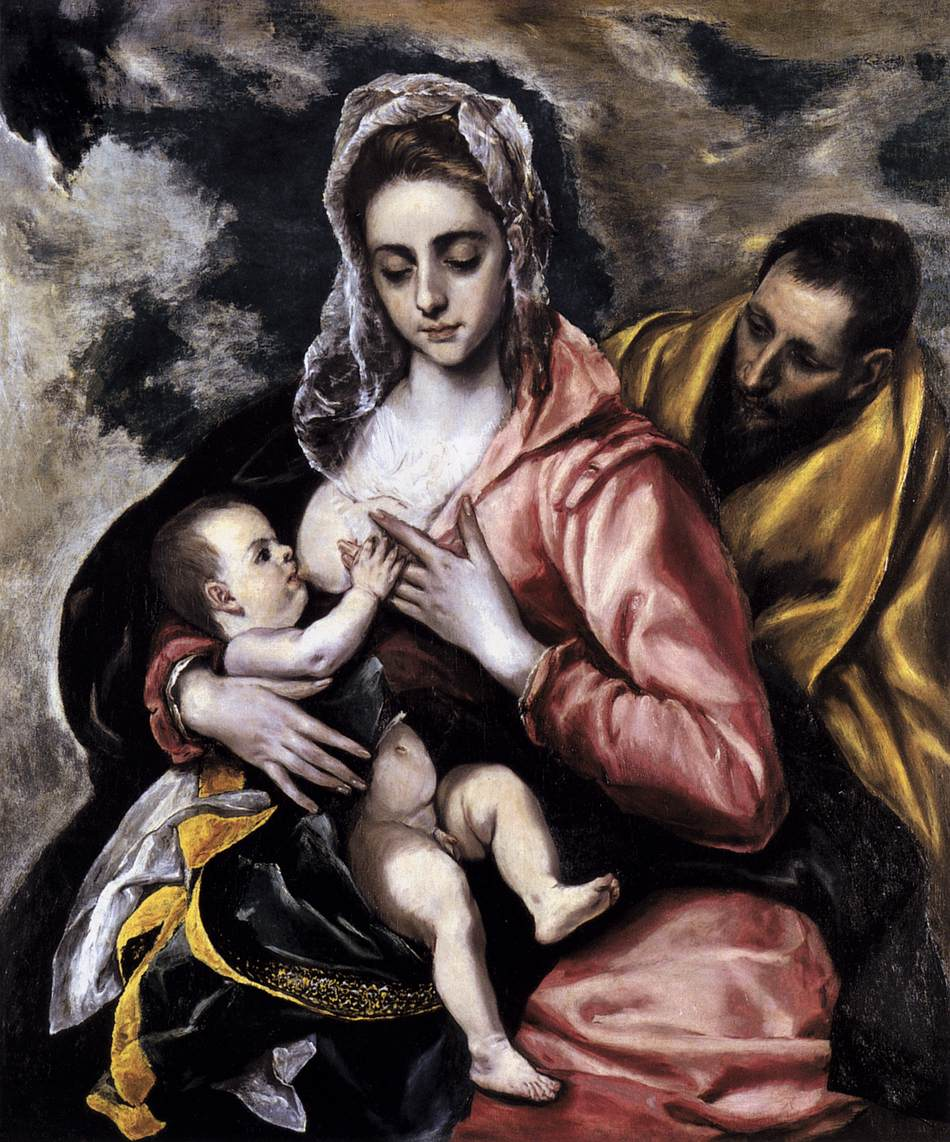
The Holy Family, El Greco, c. 1585

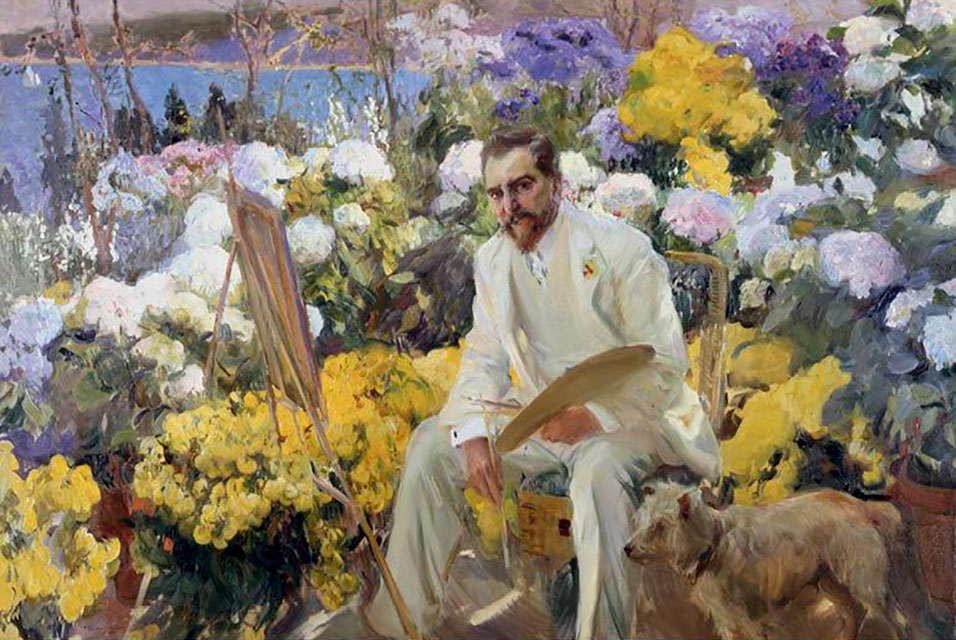
Louis Comfort Tiffany, Joaquín Sorolla, 1911

La víctima de la fiesta, Ignacio Zuloaga, 1910

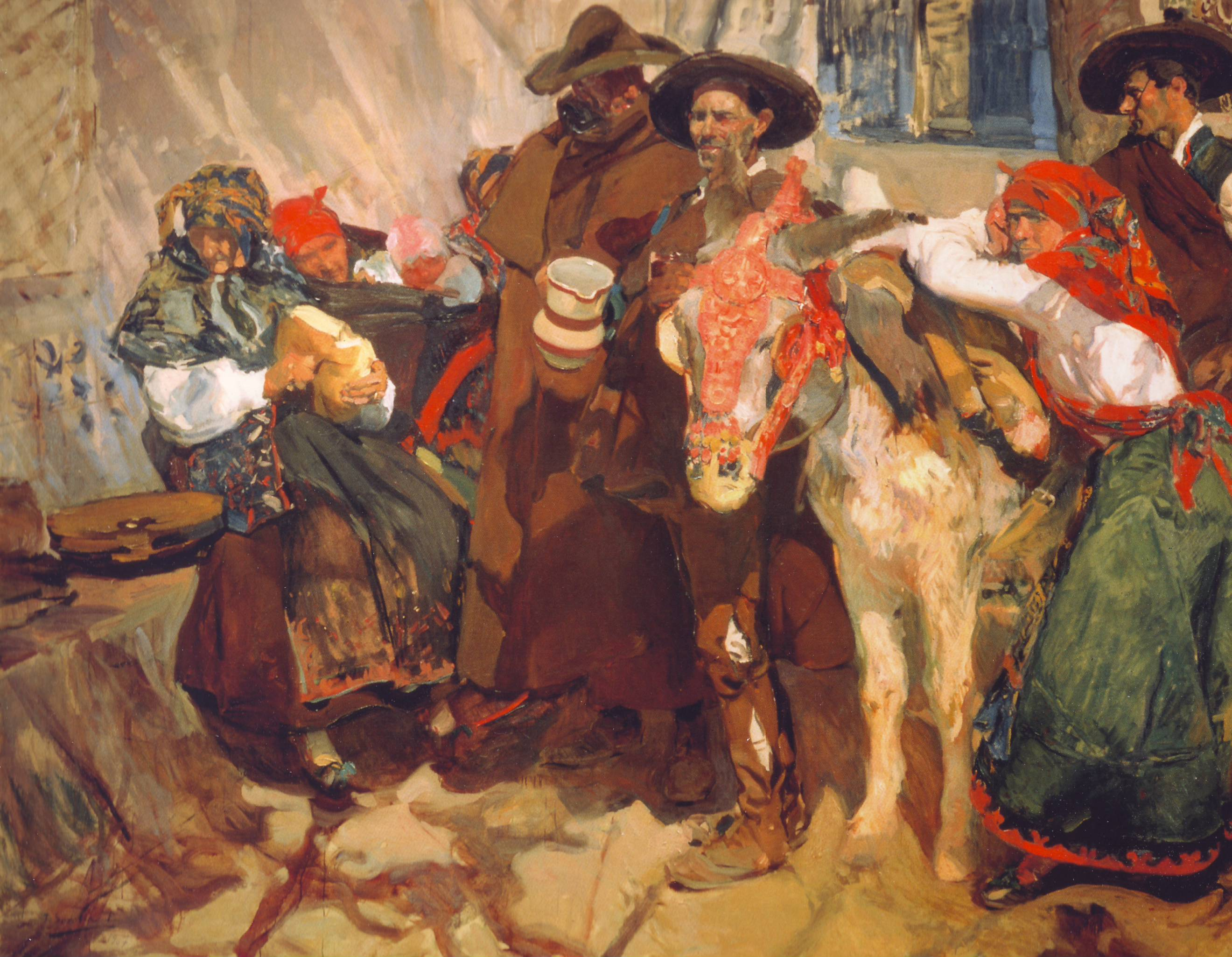
Leon villagers, Joaquín Sorolla, 1907

Portrait of a Man, El Greco, 1586-1590

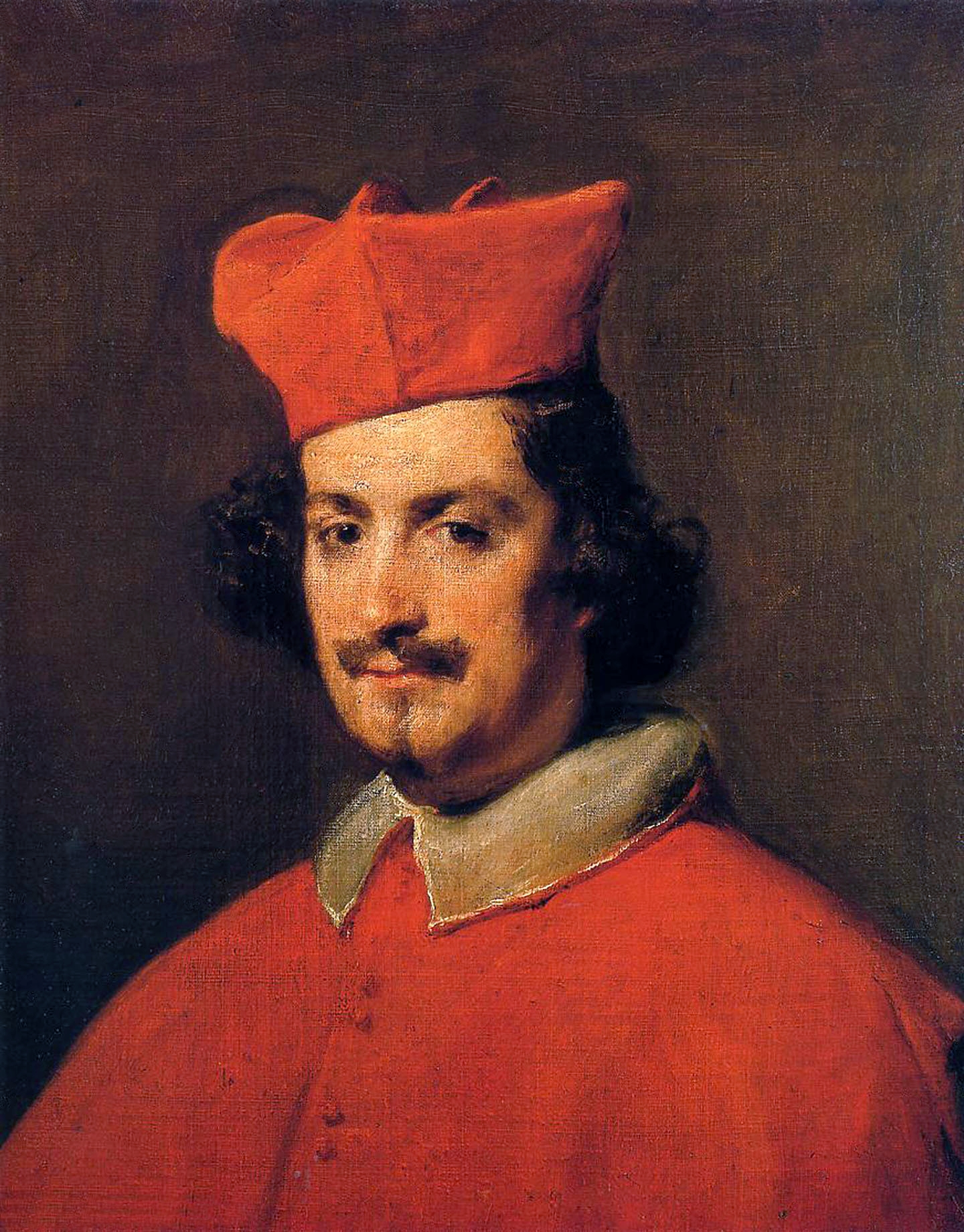
Camillo Astalli, Diego Velázquez, 1650

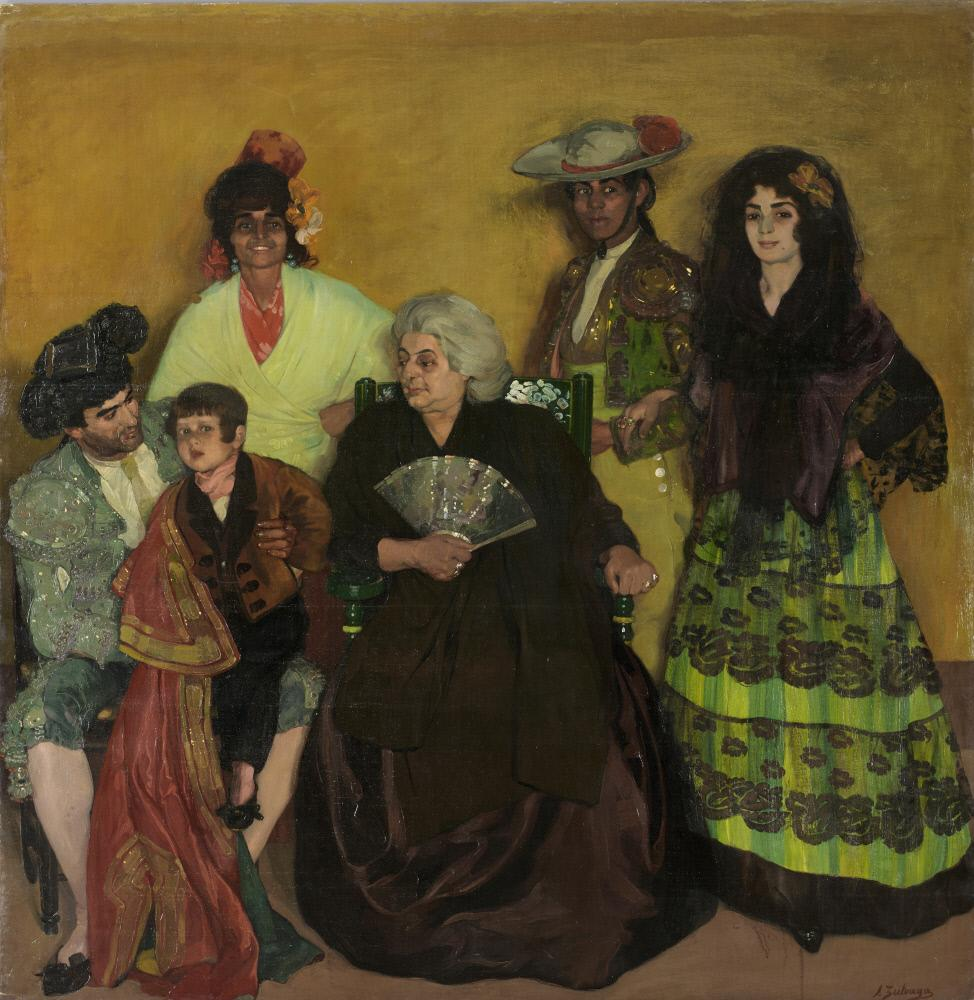
The Family of the Gypsy Bullfighte, Ignacio Zuloaga, 1903

Portrait of a Lady, El Greco, 1586-90

== See also ==
- Hispanism
- Hispanist
- List of National Historic Landmarks in New York City
- National Register of Historic Places listings in Manhattan above 110th Street
- Beatrice Gilman Proske
