= Eleanor Sherman Font =

American iconographer (1896-1982)

Eleanor Sherman Font (May 31, 1896 - September 8, 1982) was an American curator who was chairwoman of the International Exhibition of Fine and Applied Arts by Deaf Artists from 1933 to 1934 and prints and iconography curator at the Hispanic Society of America. She was one of six women chosen by Archer Milton Huntington to deepen their knowledge in art curation for the Society after graduating from library sciences programs. Her great-grandfather was Thomas Hopkins Gallaudet, founder of the American School for the Deaf in Hartford. She was deaf and volunteered for deaf causes throughout her life. During her life, she participated in services at St. Ann's Church for Deaf-Mutes, where she performed in American Sign Language with others in the choir.
