= Florence Lewis May =

American art historian (1899–1988)

- Born: Florence Lewis; 1899; Fairfield, Connecticut, United States
- Died: September 6, 1988 (aged 88); Elmira, New York, United States
- Occupations: Art historian Curator
- Spouse: William May
- Children: 2

Academic background
- Education: Gallaudet College

Academic work
- Discipline: Art history
- Sub-discipline: Textile art

Florence Lewis May (December 9, 1899 – September 6, 1988) was an American art historian and curator. May was the Curator of Textiles Emeritus at the Hispanic Society of America for the entire length of her career.

== Career ==
Born in Fairfield to Edward Everrett and Annie May Lockwood, May was deafened at the age of five from spinal meningitis. She graduated from the American School for the Deaf in 1916, and then from Gallaudet College with a Bachelor of Arts in 1921. There, May was a member of Phi Kappa Zeta.

In the year prior to graduating, May was hired by Archer Milton Huntington to work at the Hispanic Society of America. In 1945, she was given an honorary Master of Arts from her alma mater. May would spend the rest of her sixty-year career at the Hispanic Society, eventually rising to the rank of Curator of Textiles. Upon retirement in 1981, she was honored with the title of Emeritus there.

A scholar of textile art, May published articles on the topic in such academic journals as Apollo and Pantheon during the 1960s and 1970s. She died at Arnot Ogden Medical Center in 1988 at the age of eighty-eight.

== Works ==
- Catalogue of Laces and Embroideries in the Collection of the Hispanic Society of America (1936)
- Hispanic Lace and Lace Making (1939)
- Silk Textiles of Spain: Eighth to Fifteenth Century (1957)
- Rugs of Spain and Morocco: Examples from the Collection of the Hispanic Society of America (1977)

== See also ==
- List of deaf people
