= Archer Milton Huntington =

Philanthropist and art patron (1870–1955)

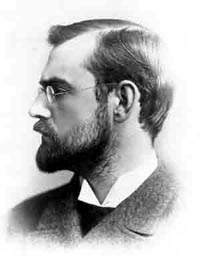
- Huntington c. 1900
- Born: Archer Milton Worsham; March 10, 1870; New York City, U.S.
- Died: December 11, 1955 (aged 85); Bethel, Connecticut, U.S.
- Spouse: Anna Hyatt Huntington

Archer Milton Huntington (March 10, 1870 – December 11, 1955) was an American philanthropist and scholar, primarily known for his contributions to the field of Hispanic studies. He founded the Hispanic Society of America in New York City, and made numerous contributions to the American Geographical Society.

He was also a major benefactor of the American Academy of Arts and Letters and the American Numismatic Society. He convinced the latter to relocate next to the Hispanic Society and the Geographical Society at the Beaux Arts Audubon Terrace complex in upper Manhattan. In 1932, he and sculptor Anna Hyatt Huntington, then his wife, founded the Brookgreen Gardens sculpture center in South Carolina in association with the antebellum Brookgreen Plantation; and the Mariners' Museum in Newport News, Virginia; it is one of the largest maritime museums in the world.

Huntington grew up in a wealthy family: he was the son of Arabella (née Duval) Huntington and the adopted son of her husband Collis P. Huntington, a railroad magnate and industrialist. He may have been Collis Huntington's biological son.

Huntington was elected to the American Academy of Arts and Sciences in 1918 and the American Philosophical Society in 1930.

== Hispanic studies ==
Huntington is primarily known for his scholarly works in the field of Hispanic Studies and for founding The Hispanic Society of America in New York City in 1904. It is a museum and rare books library whose collections focus on Old Spain and are unrivaled outside Spain.

He was one of the people who rescued the Casa de Cervantes in Valladolid. Author Miguel de Cervantes lived in the house around the time the first part of Don Quixote was published, but it was under threat of demolition. He later bequeathed it and other Cervantine artifacts to the Spanish nation and it is now a museum.

In 1908 Huntington met Spanish impressionist painter Joaquin Sorolla in England. Huntington soon made him a member of the Hispanic Society, and invited him to exhibit there in 1909. This grand exhibition comprised 356 paintings, 195 of which sold. Sorolla spent five months in the United States and painted more than twenty portraits.

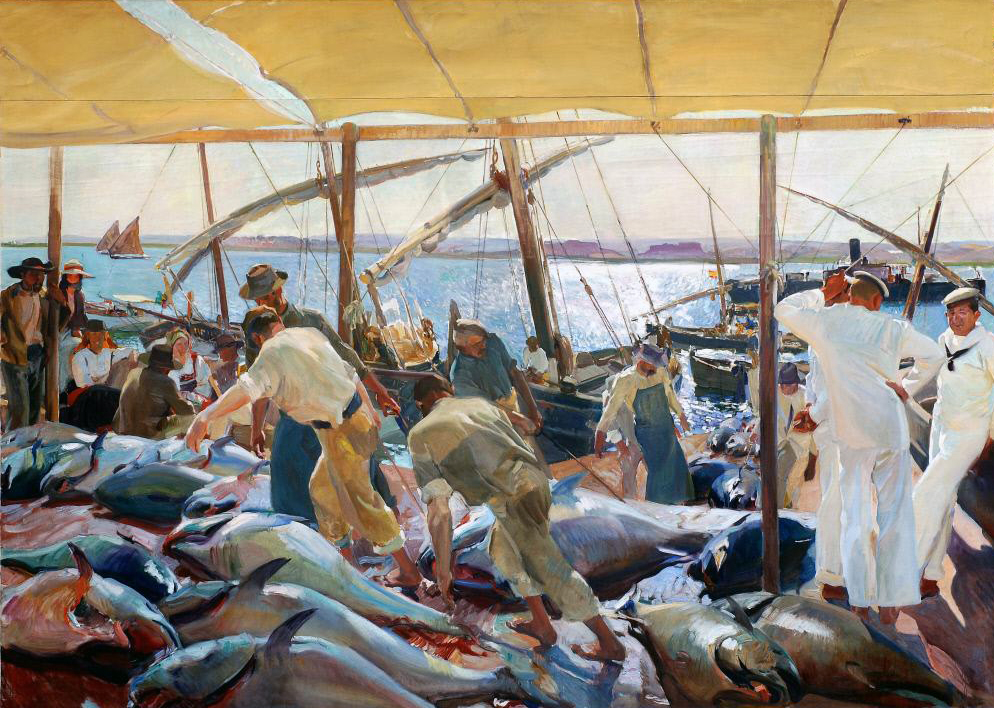
Ayamonte or La pesca del atún (1919). This is the last of Joaquin Sorolla's 14 murals completed for the Hispanic Society in Manhattan.

In 1911, Huntington commissioned Sorolla to paint 14 murals that came to be known as Vision of Spain. These are considered to be the major commission of Sorolla's career. His enormous canvases hang in what is now called the Sorolla Room of the Hispanic Society building in Manhattan; the room was opened in 1926 following Sorolla's death and dedicated to him. A major restoration of this room was completed in 2010. During the restoration of the Sorolla Room, the murals toured major art museums in Spain.

Shortly after 1920, Huntington launched the careers of six art historians in the Hispanic field: Elizabeth du Gué Trapier, Beatrice Gilman Proske, Alice Wilson Frothingham, Florence Lewis May, Eleanor Sherman Font, and Clara Louisa Penney, aiding their curatorial work and publications. He is said to have encouraged Proske, Frothingham, and May, in particular, to create the seminal works in their fields.

Huntington's wife, Anna Hyatt Huntington, was a noted American sculptor. She sculpted the bronze statues and limestone bas-reliefs that stand outside the entrance to the Hispanic Society building.

== American Geographical Society ==
In 1894 Archer Huntington became a Fellow of the American Geographical Society and a Councilor in 1904, the same year he founded the Hispanic Society of America. In 1907, Huntington was elected President of the American Geographical Society. Huntington donated land on Audubon Terrace to the AGS in 1911 and "contributed the greater part of the cost of construction" for the new building himself; Huntington also provided generous financial assistance to the AGS throughout his tenure as member.

Huntington was one of the Society's most influential leaders; he provided new facilities which enabled the AGS to expand its "staff, collections, and activities," arranged for the AGS to conduct a transcontinental excursion for geographers around the world in 1912, balanced the Society's budget, expanded its library, coordinated a collaboration between the AGS and the Association of American Geographers, and selected Isaiah Bowman as the first Director of the American Geographical Society.

Huntington was also responsible for the acquisition of the American Geographical Society Library's oldest world map: the Leardo Mappamundi. Huntington donated the 15th century map to the AGS of NY in 1906 and the map now resides in the American Geographical Society Library at the University of Wisconsin-Milwaukee. In a letter honoring Huntington after his death in 1955, the Society stated that Huntington would be remembered for his work bringing many institutions together with "academic dignity and repose."

== Philanthropy ==
In 1915, Huntington donated land next to the Hispanic Society in Washington Heights on which the American Academy of Arts and Letters could construct a permanent building in New York City. He also donated land and funds to relocate the Numismatic Society and the Museum of the American Indian to Audubon Terrace, at this same complex.

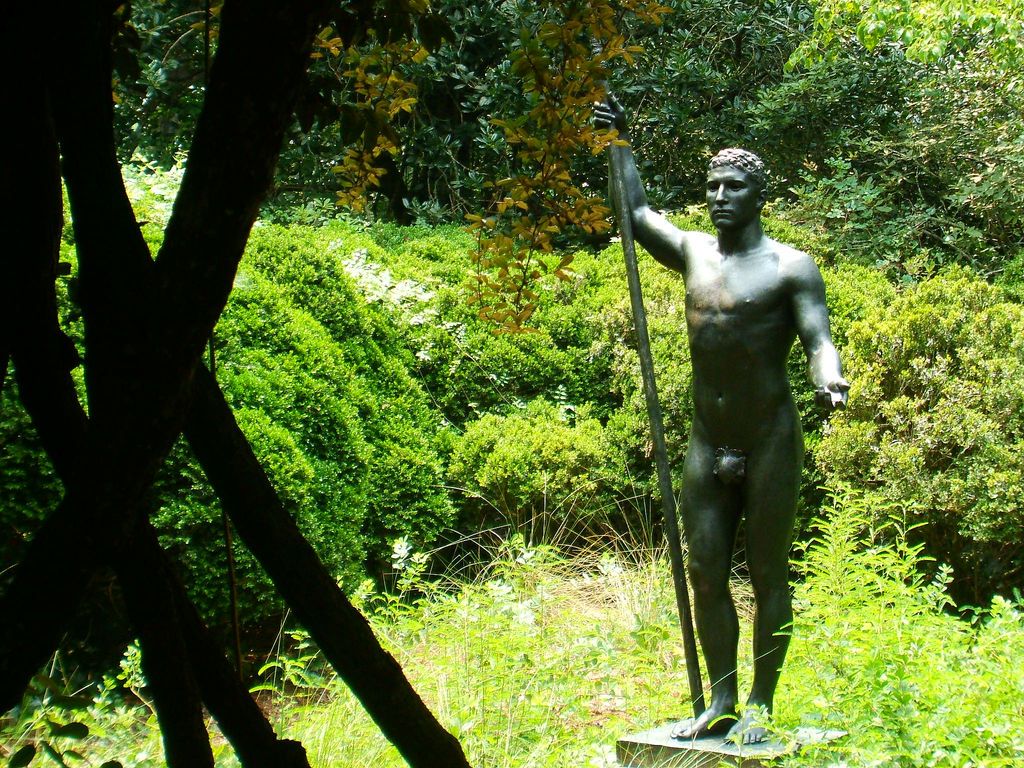
The Huntingtons founded Brookgreen Gardens in South Carolina. This is the setting for Athlete (1915), sculpture by Rudulph Evans.

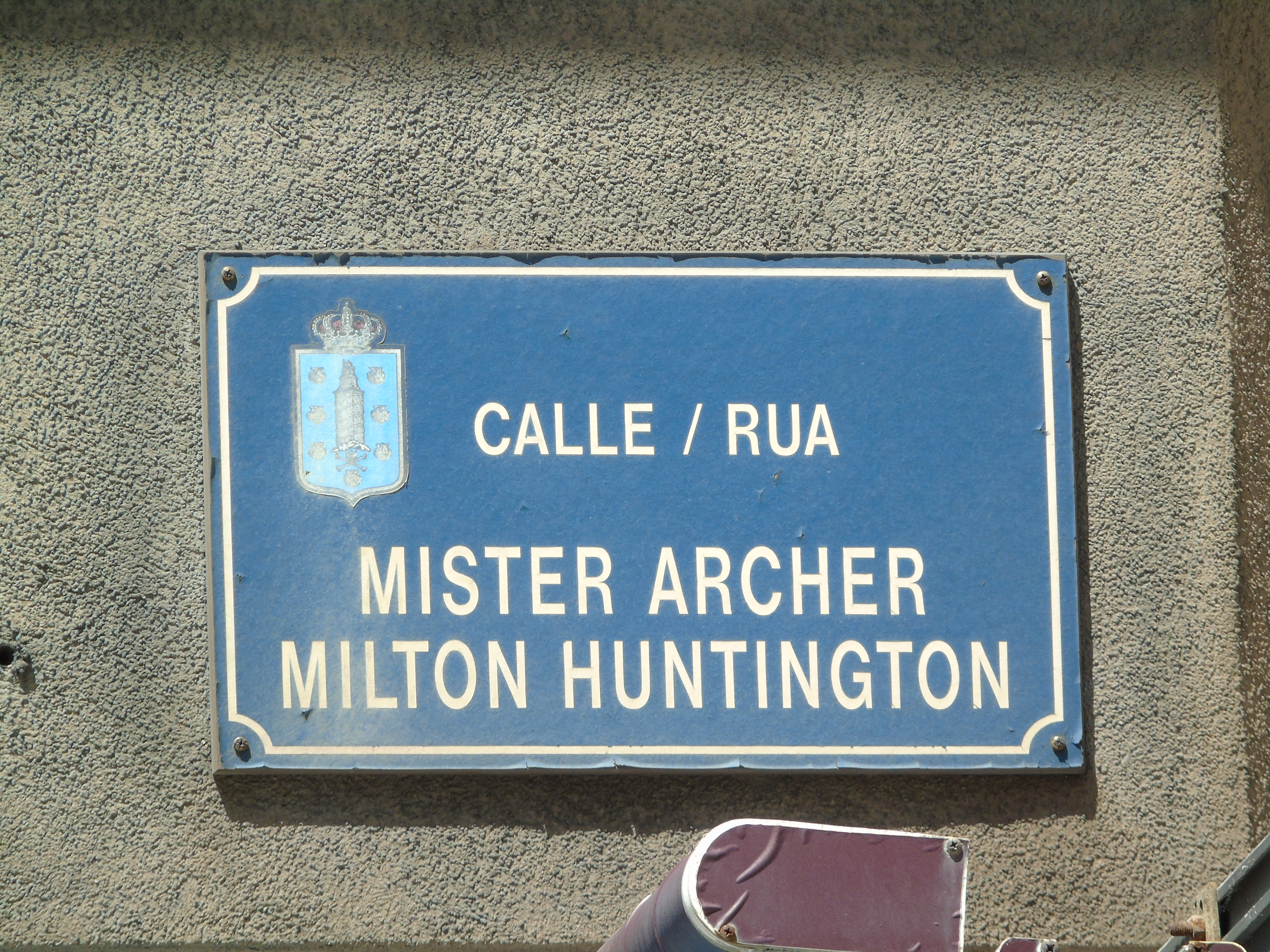
Mister Archer Milton Huntington street in La Coruña, Galicia (Spain).

During the Great Depression, Huntington and his wife donated major portions of property for philanthropic and public purposes, helping establish museums, parks, and facilities to support research and education. They had an estate called Atalaya Castle in coastal South Carolina, near Georgetown.

In 1932 he donated land and helped to create Brookgreen Gardens in South Carolina, a public sculpture garden in which to display the figurative sculpture of American sculptors. Included were many pieces by his wife, sculptor Anna Hyatt Huntington.

A portion of Brookgreen Gardens is held as a nature reserve. Another preserves Brookgreen Plantation, dating to the antebellum era. It was listed on the National Register of Historic Places in 1978. Another section of land is leased to the state for Huntington Beach State Park. The gardens, historic plantation sites, and the Huntingtons' adjacent residence, Atalaya Castle, were designated a National Historic Landmark District in 2012.

In 1932, Huntington worked with Homer L. Ferguson, president of Newport News Shipbuilding and Drydock Company, to found the Mariners' Museum in Newport News, Virginia. It is one of the largest maritime museums in the world.

In 1936, Huntington created an endowment to establish an annual stipend for a Consultant in Poetry to the Library of Congress, a position now officially known as the Poet Laureate Consultant in Poetry to the Library of Congress. In 2006, this stipend amounted to $40,000 per year, including a $35,000 salary and $5,000 in travel expenses.

From 1932 to 1939, the Huntingtons donated land for what was to become the 15,000-acre Archer Milton Huntington and Anna Hyatt Huntington Wildlife Forest in Newcomb, New York. It is now part of the State University of New York College of Environmental Science and Forestry.

In 1939, the Huntingtons donated their mansion at 1083 Fifth Avenue, and adjacent properties between 89th & 90th streets, to the National Academy, the oldest artists' organization in the United States. The property also houses the National Academy Museum and Art School.

=== Archer M. Huntington Museum Fund at the University of Texas at Austin ===
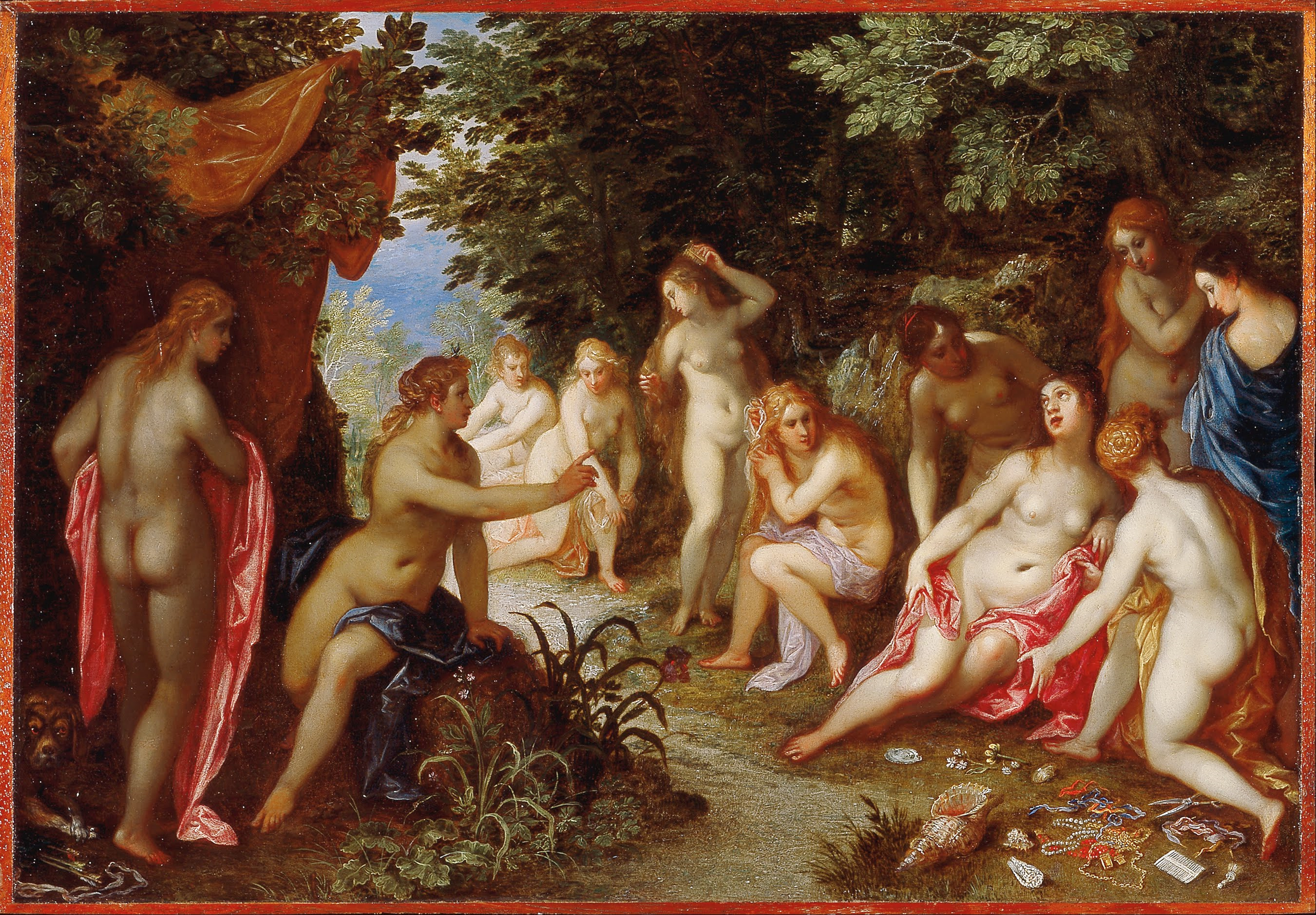
Diana and Callisto by Jan Brueghel the Elder and Hendrick van Balen, oil on copper, c. 1605-8, Blanton Museum, Austin; acquired using the Archer M. Huntington Fund in 1982.

Early in 1927, Mrs. Thomas Sheldon Maxey donated to the University of Texas at Austin a bronze sculpture, Diana of the Chase, by Archer's wife, Anna Hyatt Huntington. The gift sparked Huntington's interest in providing an art venue on the campus. In October 1927, Huntington donated approximately 4,300 acres of land in Galveston County to the University of Texas at Austin for the use and benefit of a museum. Originally valued at $145,000, the gift became the Archer M. Huntington Museum Fund. Over the ensuing thirty-five years the Fund contributed $600,000 of the $1.5 million raised to construct the Art Building, which housed both the University's Art Department and the Archer M. Huntington Gallery, which opened its doors to the public in late 1963.

Sales of the Fund's land and reinvestment of endowment income generated distributions used to support art acquisitions, exhibitions, publications, and salaries. Distributions grew from $28,000 in fiscal year 1964 to $811,000 in fiscal year 2000, when the total value of all the Fund's assets was $24.6 million.

Galleries in the Harry Ransom Center provided another venue for art on the campus, displaying the collection of paintings donated by James Michener and his wife, Mari Yoriko Sabusawa, and the Battle Collection of Plaster Casts, reproductions of ancient Greek and Roman sculpture. Oil industry executive and philanthropist Jack S. Blanton, a former UT System regent, advocated for the creation of a new, modern facility that would unite all the University's art collections. In 1996, the University launched a campaign to raise funds to construct and endow a new museum building. The Blanton Museum of Art, which opened to the public in 2006, now houses numerous collections acquired by the University over the decades, including the more than 1400 works of art that were acquired using the Archer M. Huntington Fund, ranging from an early Corinthian round aryballos (oil bottle), created c. 600 B.C.E., to the 4-minute video Nuevo [New] by Russian artist Anton Vidokle, created in 2003 and acquired using the Fund in 2004.

== Family ==
Huntington had several cousins who became prominent, including the New York City architect Charles P. Huntington. His cousin Henry E. Huntington founded the renowned The Huntington Library, Art Museums, and Botanical Gardens in California.

== Marriages ==
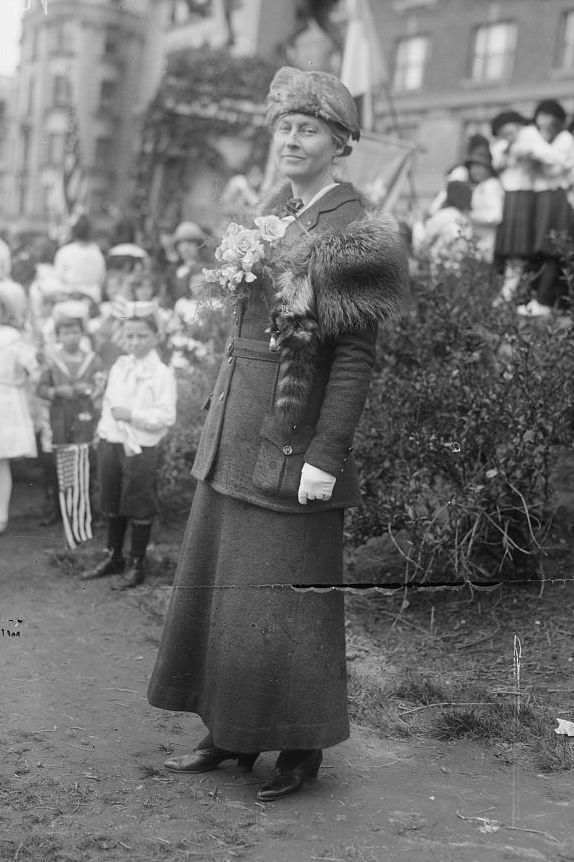
Anna Vaughn Hyatt in 1921.

Huntington first married writer Helen Manchester Gates on August 6, 1895. She was the daughter of Rev. Isaac E. Gates and Ellen M. (née Huntington) Gates, a poet and the sister of Huntington's adoptive father. While traveling in Europe at the outbreak of World War I, the young Huntington couple were temporarily detained in August 1914, and effectively under arrest by German authorities in Nuremberg, Bavaria, due to suspicions that Huntington was a spy. He was representing the American Geographical Society. Secretary of State William Jennings Bryan appealed for their release through diplomatic channels. The Huntingtons had no children and divorced in 1918.

Huntington married American sculptor Anna Hyatt on March 10, 1923. She completed both bronze sculptures and bas-reliefs featuring animals, historic Spanish figures and characters from classical literature at the Audubon Terrace at the Hispanic Society of America in New York City.

Together the couple founded Brookgreen Gardens sculpture center and nature reserve near Georgetown, South Carolina, in 1931. It incorporates the antebellum Brookgreen Plantation as part of a park.

Both of the Huntingtons' birthdays were March 10. They referred to the day as "3 in 1 day;" it is marked by celebrations at Atalaya and Brookgreen Gardens in South Carolina. The Huntingtons had no children together.

== Legacy ==
The Archer Huntington collection of Portuguese and Portuguese Colonial coins were sold at Morton & Eden, London, on November 13, 2012. The Huntington Collection of Spanish Colonial coins sale followed, also at Morton & Eden, London, on March 6, 2013.

== See also ==
- Archer M. Huntington Award
