= Alice Wilson Frothingham =

Ceramics expert

Alice Wilson Frothingham (May 10, 1902 – August 21, 1976) was a ceramics expert, specially chosen by Archer Milton Huntington for the Hispanic Society of America. She continues to be highly referenced in her work on ceramics, specifically Spanish Glass. She published works through the 1940s and 1950s on Spanish glass and pottery. Her 1951 book, The Lustre Ware of Spain, was eagerly awaited by scholars in the field, including Herbert Weissberger at the Carnegie Institute.
