= Audubon Terrace =

Cultural complex in Manhattan, New York

- Audubon Terrace Historic District
- U.S. National Register of Historic Places
- U.S. Historic district
- U.S. Historic district – Contributing property
- New York State Register of Historic Places
- New York City Landmark
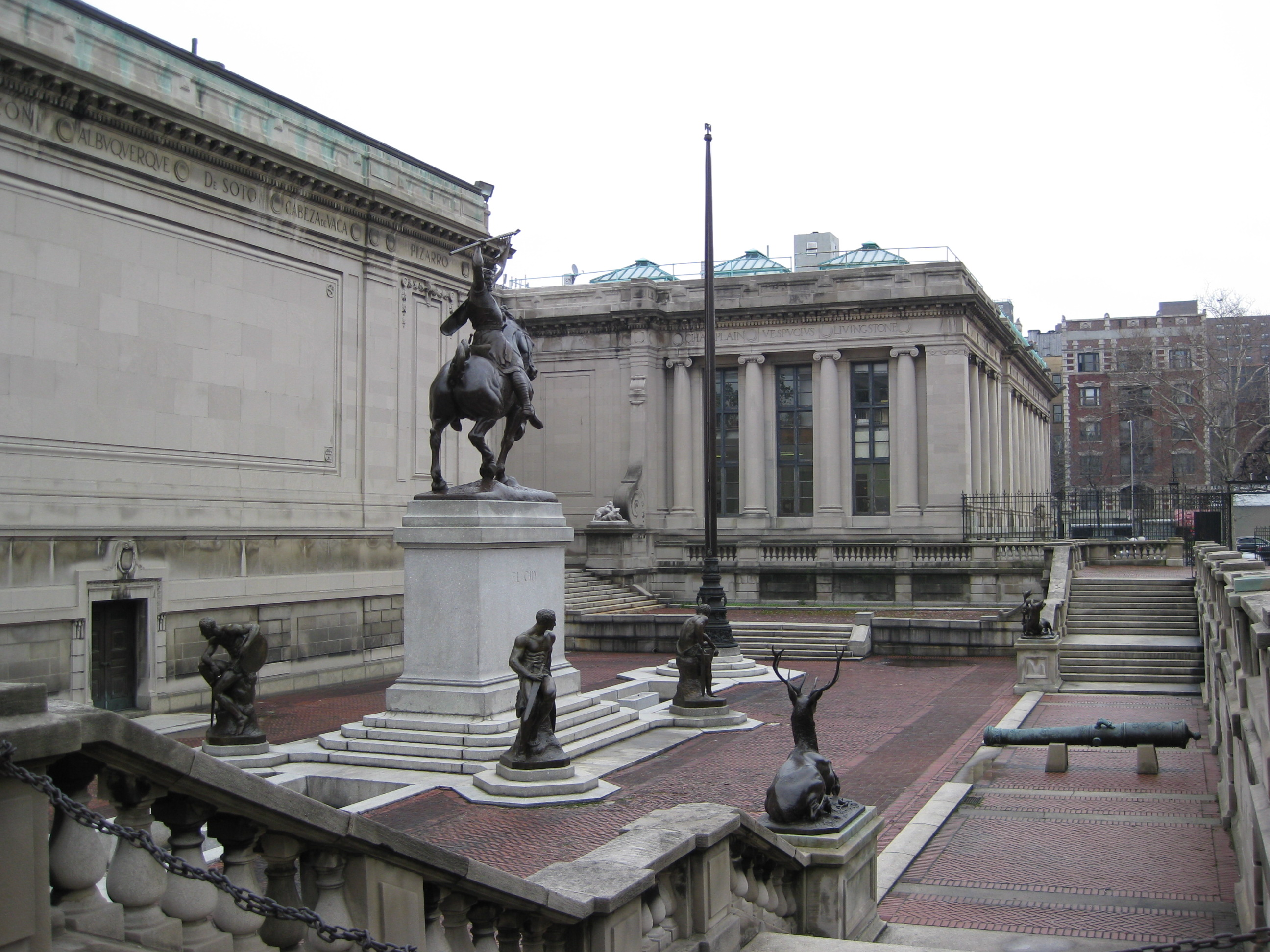
- The recessed courtyard facing northeast (2008). The Hispanic Society Library is at left, and the American Geographical Society building is visible to the right.

- Location within Manhattan Location within New York City Location within New York Location within the United States
- Location: Between Broadway, 155th Street, and 156th Street; Manhattan, New York City, US
- Coordinates: 40°50′01″N 73°56′48″W
- Built: 1907
- Architects: Charles Pratt Huntington, William M. Kendall (McKim, Mead & White), Cass Gilbert, and H. Brooks Price
- Architectural style: Beaux Arts, American Renaissance
- Part of: Audubon Park Historic District (ID100010615)
- NRHP reference No.: 80002667
- NYCL No.: 1001

Significant dates
- Added to NRHP: May 30, 1980
- Designated NYSRHP: June 23, 1980
- Designated NYCL: January 9, 1979

Audubon Terrace is a cultural complex comprising eight buildings in the Washington Heights neighborhood of Upper Manhattan, New York City, United States. The complex occupies most of a city block and is bounded by Broadway to the east, 155th Street to the south, and 156th Street to the north. Developed between 1904 and 1930 by Archer Milton Huntington, the complex is designated a New York City landmark and is listed on the National Register of Historic Places (NRHP).

The buildings, designed in the Beaux Arts and American Renaissance styles, are arranged in two parallel rows surrounding a multi-tiered plaza. Archer's cousin Charles P. Huntington drew up the master plan for the site and designed the initial buildings. The later structures were designed by William M. Kendall, Cass Gilbert, and H. Brooks Price. The buildings have similar exterior architectural design details such as colonnades and elaborate entablatures. The complex also contains artwork by Archer's wife Anna Hyatt Huntington.

The site was originally part of the estate of John James Audubon, which was later developed into the Audubon Park district. The first buildings were completed in 1907 for the Hispanic Society of America and the American Numismatic Society (ANS)—both organizations where Huntington held leadership positions. Additional buildings were designed for the American Academy of Arts and Letters (AAAL), the American Geographical Society (AGS), the Heye Foundation's Museum of the American Indian (MAI), and Our Lady of Esperanza Church, all of which received significant funding from Huntington. In the late 20th and early 21st centuries, the AGS, ANS, and MAI moved out. Boricua College, the Hispanic Society, and AAAL took over the other three institutions' buildings; Boricua College itself moved out during 2026.

== Site ==
Audubon Terrace is a cultural complex in the Washington Heights (Note: Audubon Terrace is sometimes characterized as being in Harlem, though The New York Times specifies that the complex is at the southern boundary of Washington Heights.) neighborhood of Upper Manhattan, New York City, United States. The complex occupies a 200-by-550-foot (61 by 168 m) site bounded by 155th Street to the south, Broadway to the east, and 156th Street to the north. The surrounding area is part of Audubon Park, a city and national historic district that includes several apartment houses; the Audubon Park district is sometimes itself called "Audubon Terrace". The complex is directly across 155th Street from Trinity Church Cemetery, and the Church of the Intercession is also located nearby.

The complex is one block from the 157th Street station on the New York City Subway, served by the 1 train. As originally designed, Audubon Terrace was oriented to the north, toward a plaza containing the subway entrance. However, its location considerably north of Midtown Manhattan has resulted in a perceived detriment to easy access for visitors. The surrounding neighborhood is also primarily residential and low-density commercial. As such, while residents of Manhattan's West Side could access Audubon Terrace more easily than similar museums on the East Side, people did not typically travel to Audubon Terrace unless they were already destined for Washington Heights. The New York Times writer Christopher Gray called Audubon Terrace's location "the Arctic Circle of New York's cultural globe" in 2010.

Audubon Terrace occupies part of the former estate of the naturalist and artist John James Audubon, who had bought the land in 1841. The estate was known as Minniesland—after his wife Lucy, who was called "Minnie"—and was Audubon's residence in his final years. The estate covered 30 to 40 acres (12 to 16 ha) and was likely bounded roughly by Amsterdam Avenue to the east, 158th Street to the north, 155th Street to the south, and the Hudson River to the west, though it may have stretched south toward 153rd Street (near the modern Trinity Church Cemetery). Audubon's own house, demolished in 1931, was located at 156th Street near the riverbank. There was also a small stream, fed by a spring at 157th Street. The eastern part of the block was sold in the mid-19th century to Charles Kerner, who held onto it until 1902; that site was resold five times in three years.

== Architecture ==
Audubon Terrace was built in phases between 1904 and 1930 and was commissioned by Archer Milton Huntington (1870–1955). Huntington was an heir to the Southern Pacific Railroad fortune, a philanthropist, and a Spanish scholar; his cousin, the architect Charles P. Huntington, drew up the master plan for the site. Charles designed many of the initial structures before his death in 1919, and William M. Kendall, Cass Gilbert, and H. Brooks Price finished the remaining buildings. Archer's wife, the sculptor Anna Hyatt Huntington, commissioned multiple sculptures in the complex; many of these sculptures were created for the Hispanic Society of America, one of the original tenants.

The complex consists of eight sites, four each on 155th and 156th streets, which surround a plaza. The buildings have similar exterior architectural design details, but their interiors originally hosted a wide variety of museum collections. Archer had intended Audubon Terrace as an academic and cultural complex. One writer likened Audubon Terrace to New York University's Bronx campus (now Bronx Community College) and Columbia University's Morningside Heights campus. The complex may have been inspired by the Columbia campus and by the City College of New York campus in Hamilton Heights. The New York Times wrote in 2004 that Audubon Terrace, along with the Cloisters museum at Washington Heights' northern extremity, "bookend the neighborhood".

=== Resident institutions ===
Audubon Terrace was built for five major institutional tenants, all of which were private nonprofit organizations with their own building. One of the remaining institutions is the Hispanic Society's library and museum. Its collection, consisting of manuscripts, books, and photographs, is sourced mostly from the Iberian Peninsula, alongside some items from Latin America. Another remaining institution is the American Academy of Arts and Letters (AAAL), for which two buildings were constructed; a third building was acquired in 2005. The other three institutions are no longer present on Audubon Terrace. These are the American Geographical Society (AGS), the Heye Foundation's Museum of the American Indian, and the American Numismatic Society (ANS). The complex also housed a sixth organization, the National Institute of Arts and Letters (NIAL), an AAAL affiliate that occupied the AAAL buildings until the organizations merged in 1976.

Also part of the complex is the Our Lady of Esperanza Church (Iglesia de Nuestra Señora de la Esperanza) at 624 West 156th Street, a Spanish-speaking Catholic congregation. A 50-by-100-foot (15 by 30 m) vacant lot with trees is situated between the Hispanic Society Library and the Our Lady of Esperanza Church, on the northern edge of Audubon Terrace.

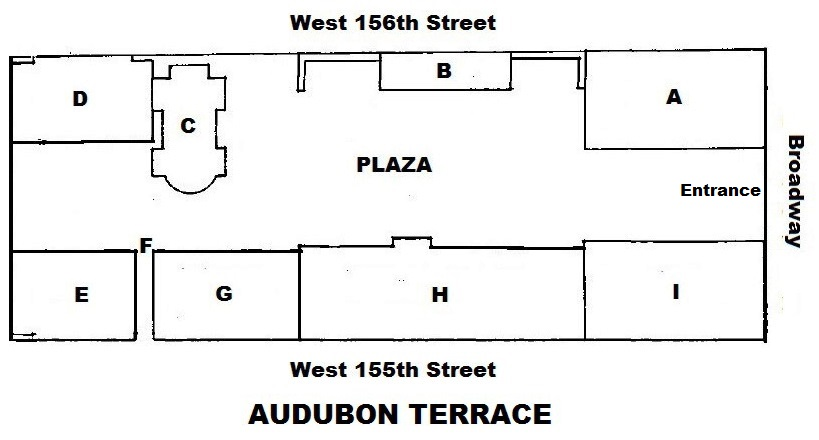

List of buildingsList of buildings
Label (Note: The labels refer to the map above, also available at Media:Audubon Terrace plan.jpg.)	Built	Architect	Original use	Current use
A	1911	Charles Huntington	American Geographical Society (AGS)	Vacant (previously Boricua College)
B	1923–30	H. Brooks Price	Hispanic Society of America Library	
C	1909–12	Lawrence G. White	Church of Our Lady of Esperanza	
D	1928–30	Charles Huntington	American Academy of Arts and Letters (AAAL) auditorium	
E	1923	William M. Kendall	American Academy of Arts and Letters main building	
F	2009	James Vincent Czajka, Pei Cobb Freed & Partners	American Academy of Arts and Letters entrance link	
G	1907	Charles Huntington	American Numismatic Society (ANS)	American Academy of Arts and Letters annex
H	1904–08	Charles Huntington	Hispanic Society of America main building	
I	1915–22	Charles Huntington	Museum of the American Indian	Hispanic Society of America annex

==== AGS building ====
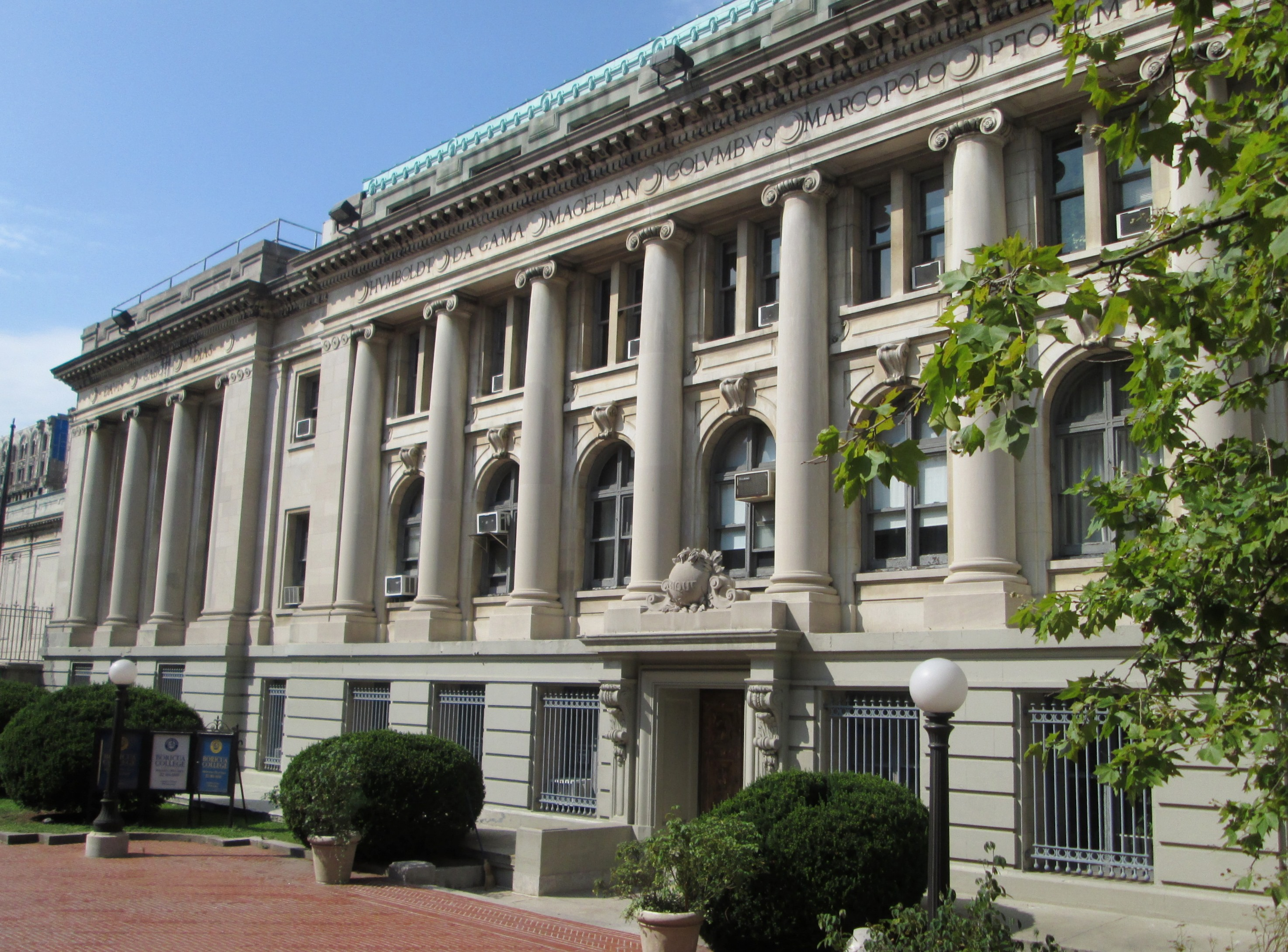
The AGS building's southern elevation

The AGS building (later Boricua College) is located at 3755 Broadway at the northeast corner of the complex, facing 156th Street and Broadway. It was designed by Charles Huntington and opened in 1911. The three-story building is designed in the Italian Renaissance Revival style. The original portion of the building measures 65 by 125 feet (20 by 38 m) across, with seven bays each on the northern and southern elevations. These elevations were later expanded four bays westward.

The base, corresponding to the basement, is rusticated and has window openings. There are also ornate doorways flanked by globes with foliate ornament; these originally had double doors, later replaced with single metal doors. The midsection, comprising the first and second stories, has double-height bays flanked by engaged columns in the Ionic order. The first-story windows are arched and are topped by keystones, while the second-story windows are arranged in pairs. Above the second story is an entablature, which has a frieze wrapping around the building. The section of the entablature on the eastern elevation contains the name American Geographical Society, while the sections on the northern and southern elevations bear the names of American explorers. The frieze is topped by a cornice with dentils and modillions. Above the cornice is a parapet with copper cresting and inset attic windows.

The interiors were built with finishes such as terrazzo floors, marble stairs, and quartered-oak windows. When built, the original building was internally divided into two sections. There was an administrative portion with offices, departmental rooms, lecture halls, and exhibit spaces; next to it was a storage section with six levels of library stacks. The four newer bays contained offices, workspaces, a library, and exhibition rooms.

==== Hispanic Society Library ====
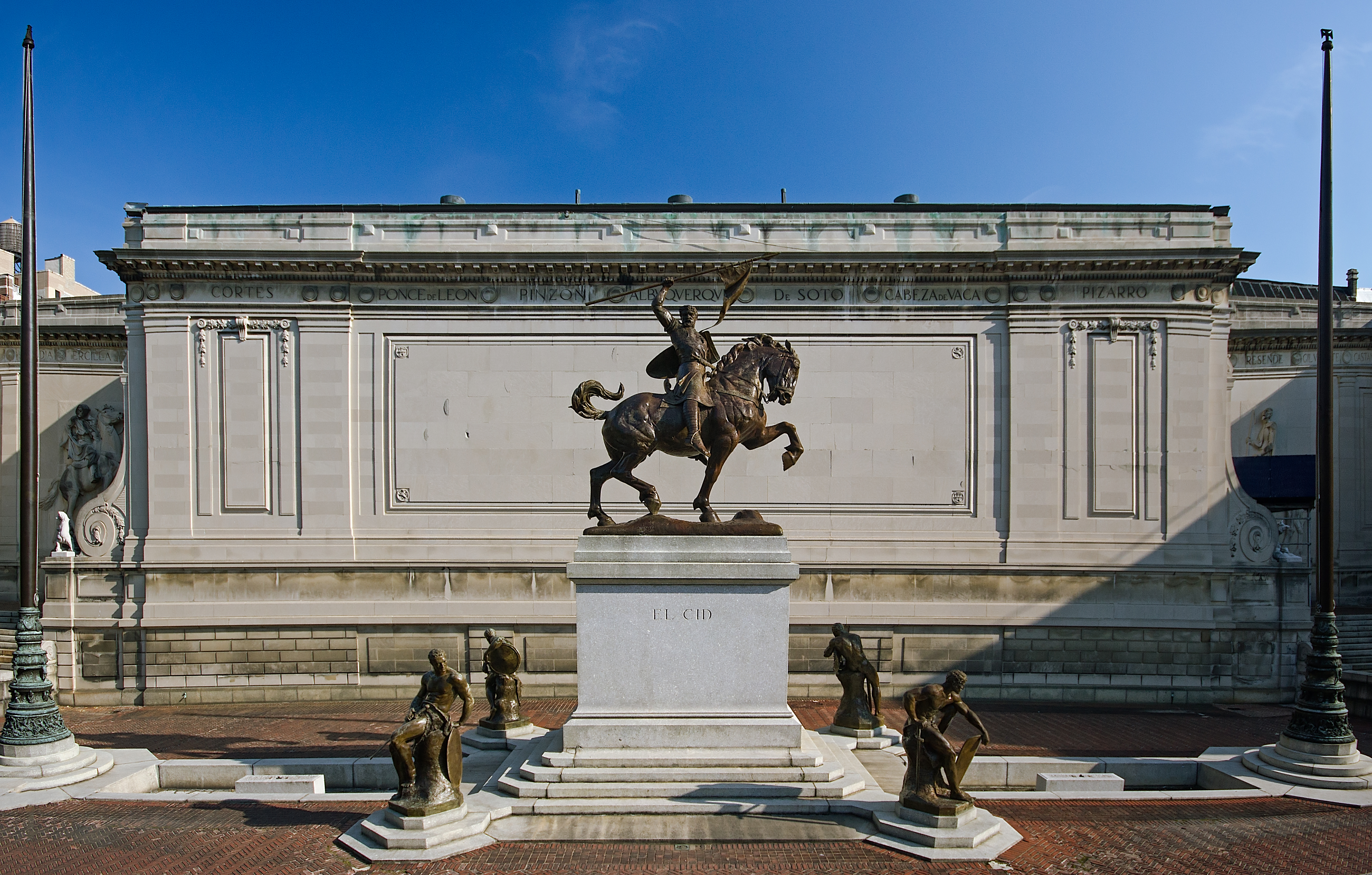
The Hispanic Society Library's southern elevation, with El Cid Campeador in front of it

The Hispanic Society Library, designed by H. Brooks Price, opened in 1930. It was built on the site of an entrance to Audubon Terrace that formerly existed on 156th Street (see Audubon Terrace § Plaza). The building measures eight stories high and 90 by 25 feet (27.4 by 7.6 m) across, with the longer dimension extending along 156th Street. Standalone "wing walls" extend along the street west and east of the building.

The southern elevation, facing the complex's southern courtyard, is a neoclassical Indiana limestone design. It lacks window openings because of the presence of storage areas inside and because it was intended as a background for the plaza's sculptural group. This elevation contains a protruding central section with a center panel and volutes on either side; it is ornamented with animal groups sculpted by Anna Huntington in 1933–1936. These are flanked by the recessed wing walls, which also have panels. The wing walls have two carved reliefs of equestrian figures by Anna: Don Quixote (1942) and Boabdil (1943–1944). Below these reliefs are inscriptions excerpted from two of Archer Huntington's poems.

From the courtyard, there are entrances on the central section's western and eastern elevations, as well as three infilled window openings. The northern, or 156th Street, elevation of the facade is made of brick. This elevation has limestone trim and includes several tiers of small windows and a bronze door. There are two arts and crafts exhibit rooms inside, which are decorated with wooden wall panels and are situated on the first floor. The rest of the interior houses the library stacks.

==== Our Lady of Esperanza Church ====
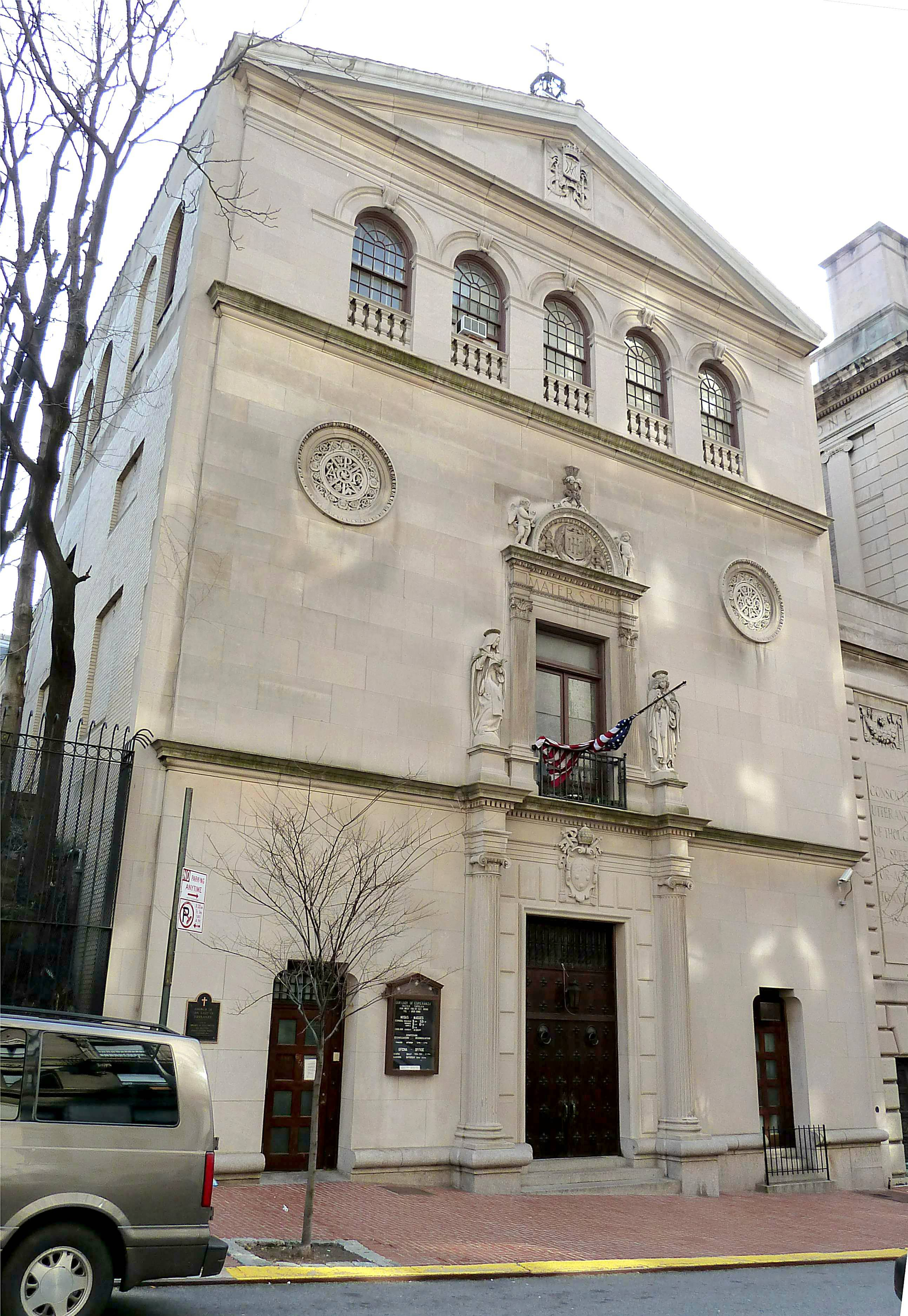
Post-1920s design of Our Lady of Esperanza Church, seen from 156th Street

Our Lady of Esperanza Church is located at 624 West 156th Street, between the Hispanic Society Library to the east and the American Academy of Arts and Letters auditorium to the west. It is an Italian Renaissance-style building completed in 1912, with an addition and remodeling in 1924 by Lawrence G. White, son of Stanford White. Unlike all the other buildings in Audubon Terrace, the church faces outward toward the street, rather than inward toward the plaza, and lacks a public entrance from the plaza. As built, it functioned as a chapel. As expanded, the church is three and a half stories high.

The facade is made of limestone or stucco. It is spanned by string courses that split it horizontally into three tiers, and it measures three bays wide. There was originally an outdoor brick staircase, which ascended to an Ionic portico; this stair was moved indoors during White's renovation. At ground level are three granite steps ascending to a group of three wooden doorways. The main entrance is located in the center and consists of a double door with Ionic columns on either side. There are single doors on either side of the central doorway, which are recessed and are made of wood and glass. The second floor has a French door flanked by Corinthian pilasters in the central bays, as well as medallions in the side bays; the third floor has balustrades and arched colonnades. At the roofline is a pediment with a crown and shield motif, behind which is a dome with Spanish tiles, a central bell-and-cross motif, and a skylight. The side elevations are made of brick, and the rear elevation is curved.

The interior, originally seating 500, had a terrazzo floor along with wood, marble, and plaster decorations. A yellow and green color palette was used inside. There was also a Siena marble altar and a painting by Joaquín Sorolla. The modern interior is illuminated by the skylight on the dome.

==== AAAL auditorium ====
The northwestern corner of the block has the AAAL's auditorium and gallery, completed in 1930 and designed by Cass Gilbert, a member of the society. It measures 100 by 116 feet (30 by 35 m) across. The southern elevation was patterned after the northern elevation of the AAAL main building, immediately to the south. It has rusticated limestone blocks and a colonnade of Ionic pilasters. The bays between each pilaster have windows have alternating triangular and curved pediments. The windows are placed behind balconettes and are surrounded by scrolled panels; the upper portions of each bay have inscribed panels. The sculptor Herbert Adams, another AAAL member, created a set of bronze entrance doors, which have motifs depicting the arts. There is a carved frieze above the facade. The auditorium has 730 seats, and measures 70 by 70 feet (21 by 21 m) across and 37 feet (11 m) tall, with a space large enough for a 60-person orchestra.

==== AAAL main building ====
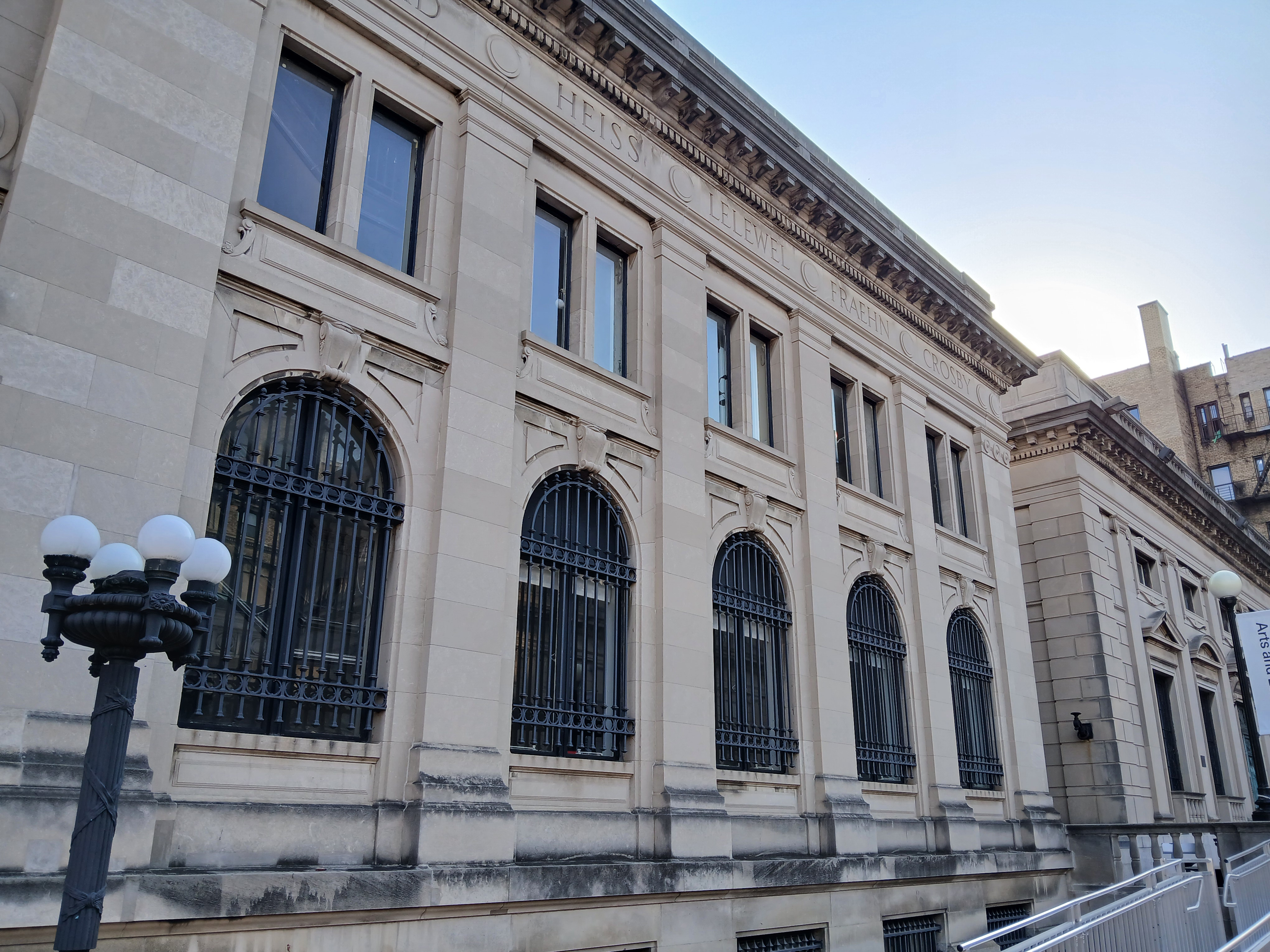
The northern elevations of the AAAL main building (right) and the ANS building (left) are connected by a glass passage (not visible here).

At the southwestern corner of the complex, William M. Kendall of McKim, Mead & White, a member of the AAAL, designed an Anglo-Italian Renaissance building for the society, which was completed in 1923. Known as the AAAL main or south building, it is located at 633 West 155th Street and is five bays wide. The AAAL main building contains the organization's library and offices, as well as reception rooms, the members' room, the library, and the south gallery.

The main building's facade has rusticated limestone blocks, in addition to two pairs of bronze doors. The northern facade is similar to that of the auditorium's southern elevation, with an Ionic colonnade and alternating triangular and curved pediments. The center bay has bronze doors sculpted by Adams, housed within a rectangular frame and crowned by a triangular pediment. Above the northern elevation's second story is a cornice of dentils and modillions, topped by a balustrade. At the basement of the southern (155th Street) elevation are Renaissance-inspired bronze doors, designed by Adolph A. Weinman in honor of the writer Mary E. Wilkins Freeman. The southern doors are in the basement, due to the site's downward slope on 155th Street, and are surrounded by a molded frame with a triangular pediment above. The first-floor windows are arched, while the second-floor windows are placed within an Ionic colonnade and have alternating curved and triangular pediments. These windows are topped by two friezes, a cornice, and a balustrade.

Immediately east of the AAAL main building is a glass-clad entrance link, added in 2009 and connecting with the former ANS building. The entrance link was designed by James Vincent Czajka with Pei Cobb Freed & Partners, measuring 12 by 12 feet (3.7 by 3.7 m) across and 16 feet (4.9 m) tall. The dimensions of the entrance link were purposely selected because of their resemblance to the golden ratio of 1.618. The walls are made of multilayered low-iron glass panes measuring 10 by 16 feet (3.0 by 4.9 m) across and flanked by gutters measuring one foot (0.30 m) wide at either end. The floor is made of 16 laminated squares of glass resting on pedestals, and the ceiling is a glass shed roof.

==== ANS building ====
The ANS building (now AAAL annex), located at 617 West 155th Street, was designed by Charles Huntington and opened in 1907. The original structure is an early example of a reinforced concrete building in the United States. It measures 40 by 63 feet (12 by 19 m), with three bays on the northern and southern elevations. The original building's style was intended to match that of the Hispanic Society's main building, constructed shortly beforehand; the lower facade, entablature, and roof decorations are continuations of those on the Hispanic Society building. There is a western annex designed in 1929 by H. Brooks Price, which is six bays wide.

The northern and southern elevations are similar, with minor differences in the window shapes. The original building's facade has an Ionic colonnade of double-height bays. The northern elevation's bays contain arched first-story windows and paired second-story windows, while the southern elevation's bays contain square windows throughout. The annexes have a similar facade design except that the colonnade has flat pilasters. The main entrance is arranged asymmetrically on the original northern facade, and above it are a pediment with foliate motifs and an entablature depicting a medallion. The ANS building originally had a large assembly hall with a balcony; a large cabinet room and library; and various smaller rooms.

==== Hispanic Society main building ====
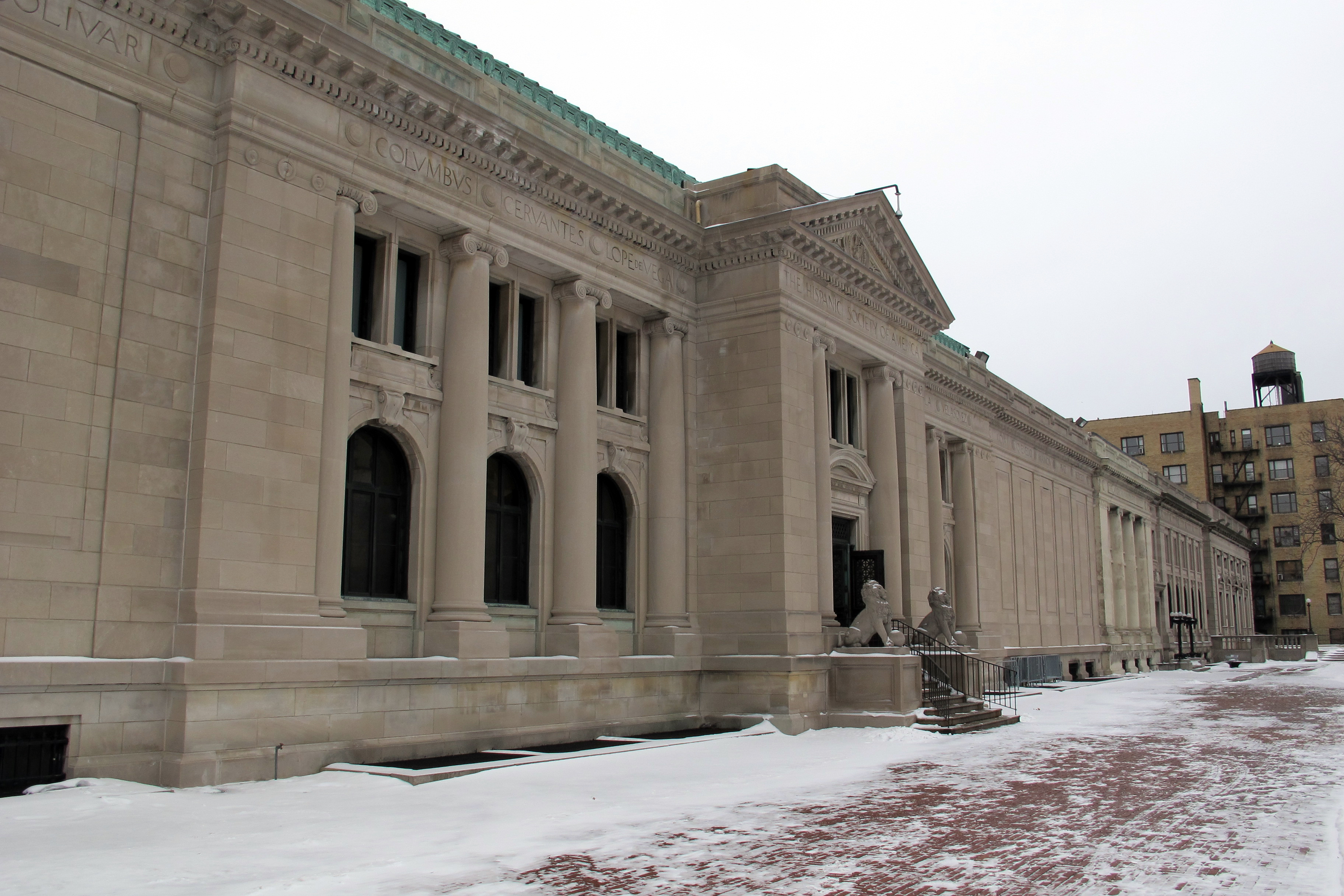
The northern elevation of the Hispanic Society's main building, seen in winter

The Hispanic Society's main building, a two-story structure at 613 West 155th Street, was the first built in the complex. As such, its exterior design influenced those of the complex's other buildings. Charles Huntington's original edifice dates from 1907 and measures seven bays wide on its northern and southern elevations. The original section is flanked by a west wing added by Charles in 1915 and an east wing added by Erik Strindberg in 1921, both extending five bays wide. The original section is designed primarily in the Renaissance Revival style, although some interior elements are influenced by Spanish architecture. The additions have similar neoclassical motifs to the original section, albeit with less detailing. All the sections are made of brick, masonry, and steel.

The facade bears the names of notable cultural figures of Spanish descent or origin, including the conquistadors. The original section's northern elevation has an Ionic colonnade of double-height bays with arched first-story windows and paired second-story windows; the center bay protrudes from the facade and has a short stair leading to a doorway. The entrance stair is flanked by lions designed by Anna Huntington. There is an elaborate pediment above the doorway, along with a tympanum depicting a Spanish caravel or ship. Originally, the doorway had a pair of bronze doors from a mosque in Cairo. These have been replaced with double doors designed by Berthold Nebel, which were completed in 1939 after ten years of work; Nebel's doors consist of nine 5-by-11-foot (1.5 by 3.4 m) relief panels. Above the second story is an entablature, which contains a frieze with some Spanish figures' names, along with a cornice of dentils and modillions. A copper-crested parapet runs above the cornice.

The original section's southern elevation on 155th Street has no doors or windows. There is an arcade of pilasters in the Ionic order, spanning nine bays wide. The original southern elevation has carved reliefs representing Iberian Peninsula civilizations, installed in 1939 and designed by Nebel. The annex's bays are flanked by pilasters rather than columns, the wall openings are filled with ashlar panels, and the roofs are flat. Additional names are inscribed in the bays of the annexes' southern elevations.

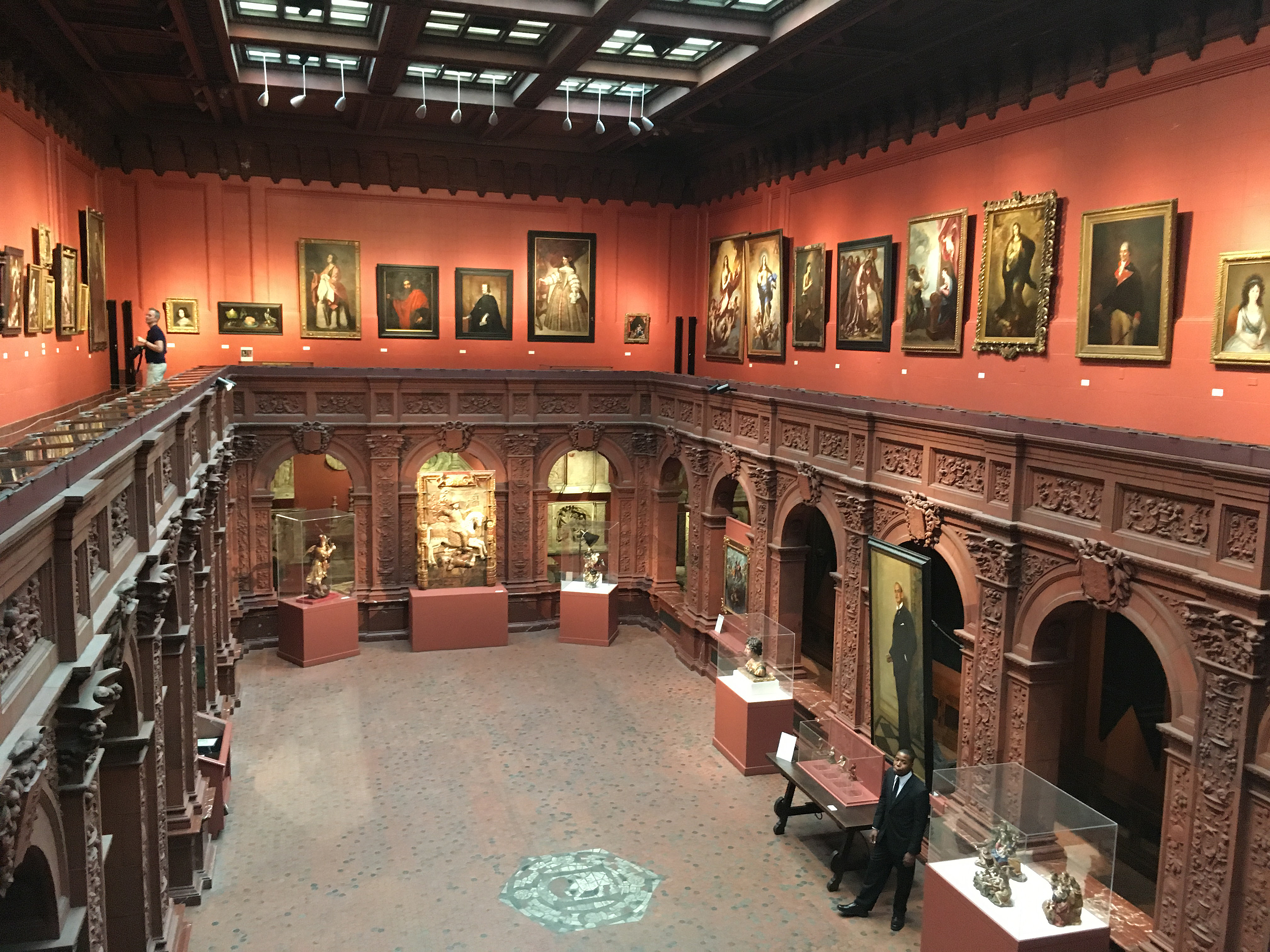
Interior of the central court

The interior spaces are decorated with tiles and mosaics from various eras. The main entrance leads to a hallway flanked by ornate staircases. The primary interior space is a central court, originally a reading room. Measuring 98 by 40 feet (30 by 12 m) across by 35 feet (11 m) high, it is designed in the style of a Spanish house's patio and has a gallery level, with large archways supported by terracotta pillars. The court also has illuminated tables, chairs, and a conveyor belt system that transports books from the basement. The spaces under the galleries were originally used as various exhibition spaces, and their walls have paintings of notable Spanish figures by Francis Lathrop.

Other parts of the interior were originally devoted to painting and sculpture galleries. The west wing contains the Sorolla Room, which has a mural series, Provinces of Spain by Joaquín Sorolla, on its walls. The 230-foot-long (70 m) mural series, depicting Iberian topics, dates from 1919–1920. The room itself, originally intended as the "Chamber of the Hundred", was furnished with Spanish marble floors and Spanish wood furniture; it is used as a gift shop. The east wing includes a smaller reading room with tile floors, woodwork, neoclassical piers, and galleries surrounding a skylit central area. As built, the east wing had storage and sales areas as well, and the basement was also used for storage.

==== MAI building ====
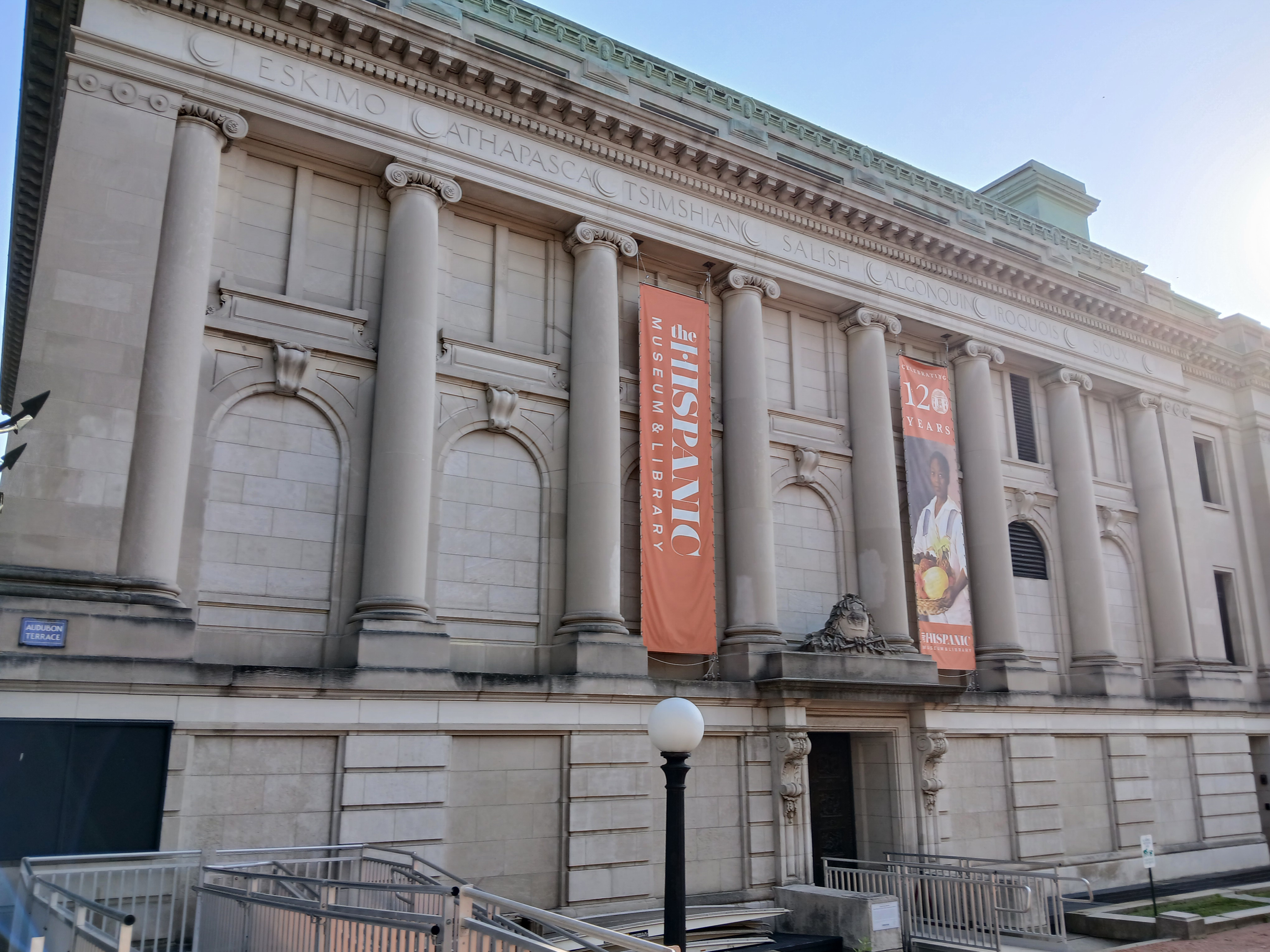
The MAI building's northern elevation, seen from the lower plaza

The MAI building (now Hispanic Society annex) is located at 3741 Broadway, just east of the Hispanic Society's original building, at the southeast corner of the complex (at 155th Street and Broadway). It was designed by Charles Huntington and opened in 1922. The three-story building is designed in the Italian Renaissance Revival style, duplicating the AGS building immediately to the north. Like the AGS building, the northern and southern elevations are eleven (originally seven) bays wide.

The facades have a rusticated base, above which are double-height bays with first-story arches and second-story openings flanked by Ionic engaged columns. The windows on these levels have been mostly filled in. The base's southern elevation has a fire exit door. Above the second story is an entablature, which has a frieze wrapping around the building; the eastern elevation contains the name Museum of the American Indian–Heye Foundation, while the northern and southern elevations bear the names of Native American tribes. The frieze is topped by a cornice with dentils or modillions. A copper-crested parapet with inset attic windows runs above the cornice. The building has a copper roof.

As built, the structure hosted study collections in the basement, exhibition rooms on the first to third floors, and offices on part of the first floor. The interior retains little of its original decoration, except a staircase to the west. Doorways lead west to the Hispanic Society's main building.

=== Plaza ===
The buildings surround a plaza, which is accessed from Broadway and contains terraces at several levels. Next to the Broadway entrance is a lower plaza abutting the two easternmost (MAI and AGS) buildings. Stairs ascend west to an upper plaza enclosed by an iron fence, which abuts the ANS building and the AAAL's and Hispanic Society's main buildings.

Two staircases descend from the north end of the upper plaza to a sunken courtyard next to the Hispanic Society Library. The balusters of the courtyard stairs have groups of deer sculptures by Anna Huntington, which are made of bronze and marble. The sunken courtyard originally had a terrace extending north to 156th Street, which contained the original entrance to the Hispanic Society buildings. The entrance has since been replaced by the Hispanic Society Library. To the west and east of the sunken courtyard, short staircases with limestone cladding and neoclassical balustrades ascend to slightly raised areas.

The sunken courtyard has a large equestrian statue of the Spanish knight El Cid (1927), in front of the Hispanic Society Library, designed by Anna Huntington. The sculpture is made of bronze and is a replica of a similar statue Anna created in Seville. It is flanked by a pair of flagpoles with bronze bases, which display the flags of Spain and the US, and are connected by a reflecting pool. There are also four bronze statues of warriors at the corners of El Cid's pedestal.

== History ==
Audubon Terrace was built soon after the opening of the first New York City Subway line, which was built to 157th Street in 1904. Archer Huntington, a major philanthropist, developed the complex starting in the 1900s. At the time, there had been anticipation that the northward march of residences and cultural institutions would eventually reach the area. Instead, skyscrapers were built elsewhere in Manhattan, and most of the organizations that moved to Audubon Terrace were headed by or strongly connected to Archer. His mother Arabella Huntington also donated some of her land holdings there to these institutions. Audubon Terrace was developed simultaneously with cultural institutions such as the New York Public Library Main Branch, the main Metropolitan Museum of Art building, and the Morgan Library & Museum, which were also funded by early-20th-century philanthropists. The complex was generally known as Huntington's museum complex prior to World War II; it only gained the Audubon Terrace name later on.

=== Development ===
==== 1900s: Creation ====
Archer had been interested in Hispanic culture since childhood, leading him to found the Hispanic Society of America on May 18, 1904. (Note: Another source gives an alternate date of July 8, 1904. The deed of incorporation was formally filed on July 30, 1904.) He bought land "out in Audubon Park" for the construction of the society's headquarters, acquiring a 250-foot-wide (76 m) land lot between 155th and 156th streets from George Bird Grinnell via the Lansing Company. In August 1904, Archer announced plans to build a Hispanic museum on that site, which, according to The Sun, elicited skeptical commentary. Archer commissioned Charles Huntington to design a building for the Hispanic Society at Audubon Park, and Charles filed plans for that building in November 1904, with a budget of $155,000. (Note: Equivalent to $4,197,000 in 2025) The plans called for a five-story neoclassical building. The western end of the block, facing Riverside Drive, was sold to a developer in 1905; Archer made no attempt to buy that land, and an apartment house was constructed there in 1914.

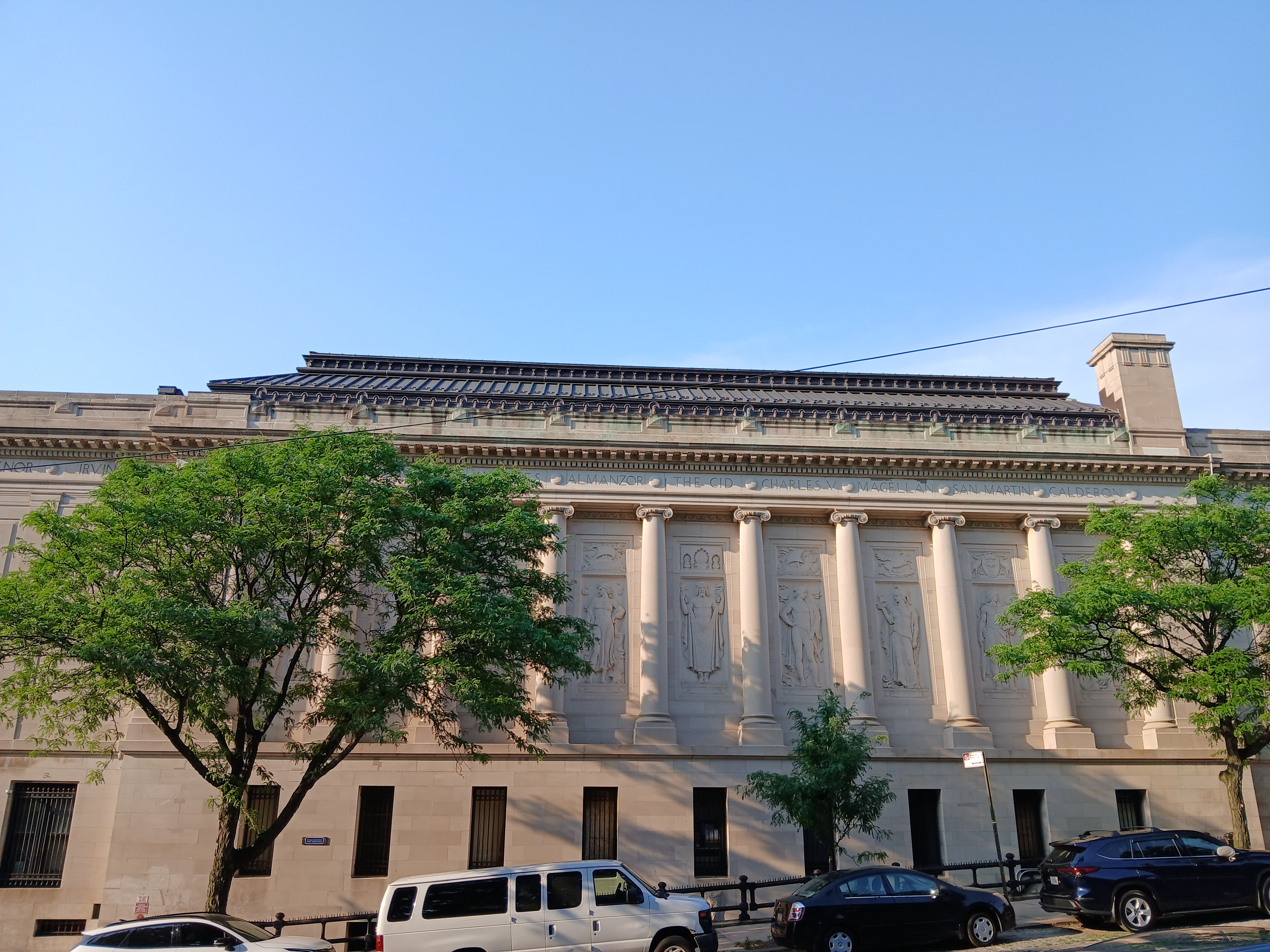
The original Hispanic Society building's southern elevation

Archer also owned a large number of numismatic artifacts, and he became president of the American Numismatic and Archeological Society (ANS; later American Numismatic Society) in the mid-1900s. (Note: Sources disagree on whether he assumed the ANS's presidency in 1905 or 1906.) He gifted the ANS a site at Audubon Park in 1906; at the time, the ANS was headquartered on Herald Square in Midtown Manhattan. Charles filed plans in July 1906 for an ANS building on 155th Street, budgeted at $55,000 (Note: Equivalent to $1,475,000 in 2025) and designed in the Neo-Grec style. Archer subsequently bought two lots on the north side of 155th Street from the Grinnell family, and he demolished the Smythe family house to make way for a central plaza. Archer's mother bought additional land on Broadway from Lena Vanner in early 1907, and progress on the Hispanic Society and ANS building was well underway by that year. Funds were also being raised for a Spanish-speaking Catholic church building on the 156th Street side of the complex, which Huntington hoped would, along with the Hispanic Society, make the complex into a Spanish cultural hub. To alleviate Grinnell's complaints about construction, Archer gave Grinnell a lifetime ANS membership.

The Hispanic Society building was completed in 1907, but its opening was delayed while the collections were arranged. It opened on January 20, 1908, with a collection of books, artwork, porcelains, bronzes, and small objets d'art. The ANS hosted its first meetings in its building that month, although the structure had been completed at the end of 1907. A real-estate partnership, the Audubon Park Syndicate, bought Grinnell's holdings on the block in November 1908. Grinnell's family subsequently moved out, and Archer bought ten lots from the Audubon Park Syndicate the following January, measuring 125 by 200 feet (38 by 61 m) across and facing onto 155th and 156th streets.

Meanwhile, Archer had assumed the presidency of a third organization, the American Geographical Society (AGS), in 1907. In May 1909, the AGS council accepted Archer's offer of land at the corner of Broadway and 156th Street, on the site of Charles Kerner's house. Charles filed plans that June for a two-story Catholic church building at 156th Street, with a budget of $50,000. (Note: Equivalent to $1,280,000 in 2025) At the time, the church was intended for Our Lady of Guadalupe. He also designed the AGS building, submitting plans in August for a three-story building and a plaza entrance costing $250,000–300,000, (Note: Equivalent to $6,398,000–7,677,000 in 2025) with similar design features to the previous buildings. Charles filed plans for the Hispanic Society's first annex in November 1909, and the AGS began erecting its building around that time.

==== 1910s and 1920s: Expansion ====
The AGS building was finished in 1911. The Spanish church, Our Lady of Esperanza Church, was also completed by that year, (Note: One source puts the completion of the church as 1910.) having been funded in large part by Archer's monetary and land donations, even though he was not Catholic. By then, the four buildings at Audubon Terrace—the Hispanic Society, AGS, ANS, and church—were collectively valued at $1.06 million, (Note: Equivalent to $26.6 million in 2025) while the site was worth another $1.5 million. (Note: Equivalent to $37.6 million in 2025) Our Lady of Esperanza Church was consecrated in July 1912, while the AGS building had its official housewarming later that year; the church was re-consecrated the following April when its debts were paid off.

In January 1915, Archer provided eight lots at Audubon Terrace (four each on 155th and 156th streets) to the American Academy of Arts and Letters (AAAL) and its affiliate the National Institute of Arts and Letters (NIAL), provided the AAAL develop a building there within five years. McKim, Mead & White were hired to draw preliminary plans for the AAAL structure. The two organizations accepted the offer the next month, but the onset of World War I delayed construction by several years. Charles Huntington also designed an annex for the Hispanic Society that year. The society constructed a bronze gate to the upper plaza, memorializing Cervantes, which was dedicated in May 1916. That month, Archer donated the vacant 125-by-100-foot (38 by 30 m) site at the northwest corner of Broadway and 155th Street to George Gustav Heye's Museum of the American Indian (MIA), which accepted the offer. Charles drew up plans for a new building there. The MAI building, budgeted at $250,000, (Note: Equivalent to $5,102,000 in 2025) (Note: This is the figure given by multiple sources. Others give alternate figures: $195,000 (equivalent to $3,980,000 in 2025); $300,000 (equivalent to $6,122,000 in 2025); $400,000 (equivalent to $8,163,000 in 2025)) was under construction by late 1916. The MAI began moving its collection into its building in late 1917, and the museum had moved its offices into the building by the next year. Charles died in 1919, shortly after designing the MAI building, and before he could be hired to draw more detailed plans for the AAAL.

Erik Strindberg filed plans in April 1920 for another expansion of the Hispanic Society's main building on 155th Street, which was completed in 1921. During the decade, Audubon Terrace began hosting events such as sculpture exhibits, and local residents proposed constructing a vehicular tunnel under the complex to facilitate traffic flow on nearby Riverside Drive. Plans for the AAAL building were filed in July 1921, at which point it was to cost $300,000. (Note: Equivalent to $4,280,000 in 2025) Work began immediately, and a cornerstone-laying ceremony was hosted later that year; the AAAL building was ultimately dedicated in February 1923; one commentator said that "nothing outside of France, Belgium, Spain and (strangely enough) Brazil corresponds to the precise uses of this building". At the other end of Audubon Terrace, the MAI building opened to the public in November 1922. By then, the Hispanic Society was planning to enlarge its library; at the time, some sites at the north end of the complex remained undeveloped. The AAAL building's basement sustained minor damage in a 1928 fire.

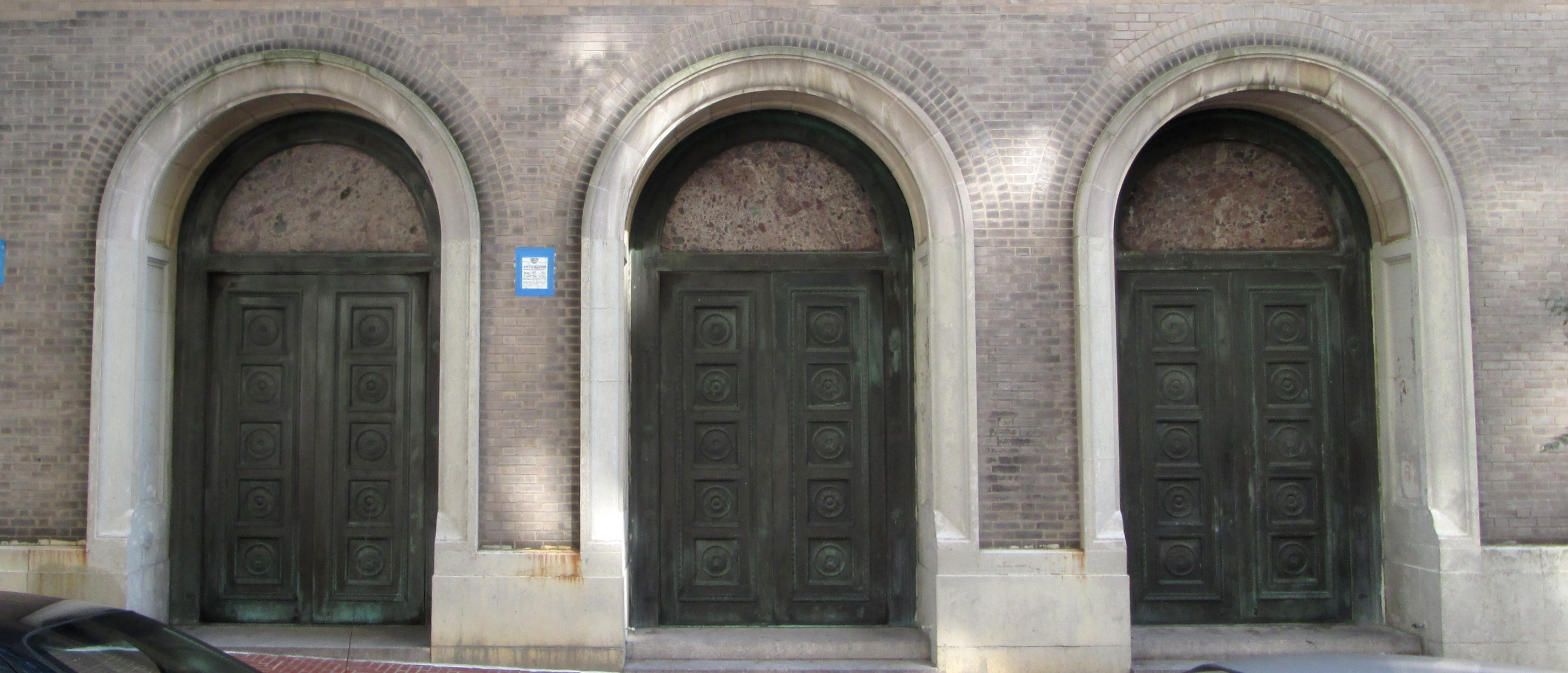
Street level doors of the AAAL auditorium

Several of Audubon Terrace's institutions expanded their facilities in the 1920s. H. Brooks Price was hired in 1923 to design the Hispanic Society Library building on one of the vacant sites at Audubon Terrace's north end. Lawrence White was hired in 1924 to renovate Our Lady of Esperanza Church; this work involved the installation of new sculptures, which were delayed by a strike over the use of pneumatic tools. The MAI's Audubon Terrace building was already insufficient when it opened, and Archer gave the museum some land in the Bronx, where the institution opened a research annex in 1926. The AAAL received an anonymous donation in 1928 for the construction of another building at Audubon Terrace, facing 156th Street, designed by Cass Gilbert as an auditorium and gallery. The next year, Price was rehired to design an annex for the ANS.

=== Operation ===
==== 1930s to 1970s ====
The AAAL dedicated its auditorium–gallery building in November 1930, and the Hispanic Society Library opened the same year. The AAAL used its newly expanded facility to host exhibits and ceremonies. In 1930, the MAI moved its library collection from Audubon Terrace to the Huntington Free Library and Reading Room. Audubon Terrace's other institutions were stymied by stipulations that Huntington had issued after leaving these organizations. For example, the Hispanic Society could neither relocate nor increase its building's capacity beyond 50 people, and the AGS was required to keep its collection publicly accessible. Because the organizations were all related to "art, culture, history, charity and education", they were all exempt from paying property taxes under New York state law. With the Great Depression, the area around the intersection of Broadway and 155th Street became a less fashionable place to live. The surrounding area saw significant demographic changes in the mid-20th century, with many white residents moving out and being replaced with Black and Hispanic residents. The complex itself formally adopted the Audubon Terrace name after World War II.

Huntington died in 1955, having provided massive sums to Audubon Terrace's institutions over the years. By the 1960s, the ANS museum was open to the public free of charge. The MAI also charged no admission, and the AGS's collection and the Hispanic Society's exhibit spaces were also open to the public. The AAAL and NIAL also hosted public exhibitions of members' work, and all five organizations co-hosted at least one festival annually. The Hispanic Society, AGS, and MAI were all considering renovating their buildings by the mid-1960s, when the buildings were nominated for city landmark designation. Although Audubon Terrace was well-known within the neighborhood, few people were visiting the complex from elsewhere. The blocks immediately around Audubon Terrace contained bodegas, apartment buildings, and a gas station; the neighborhood had a seedy reputation, and the complex was scarcely mentioned in the news unless a crime took place nearby.

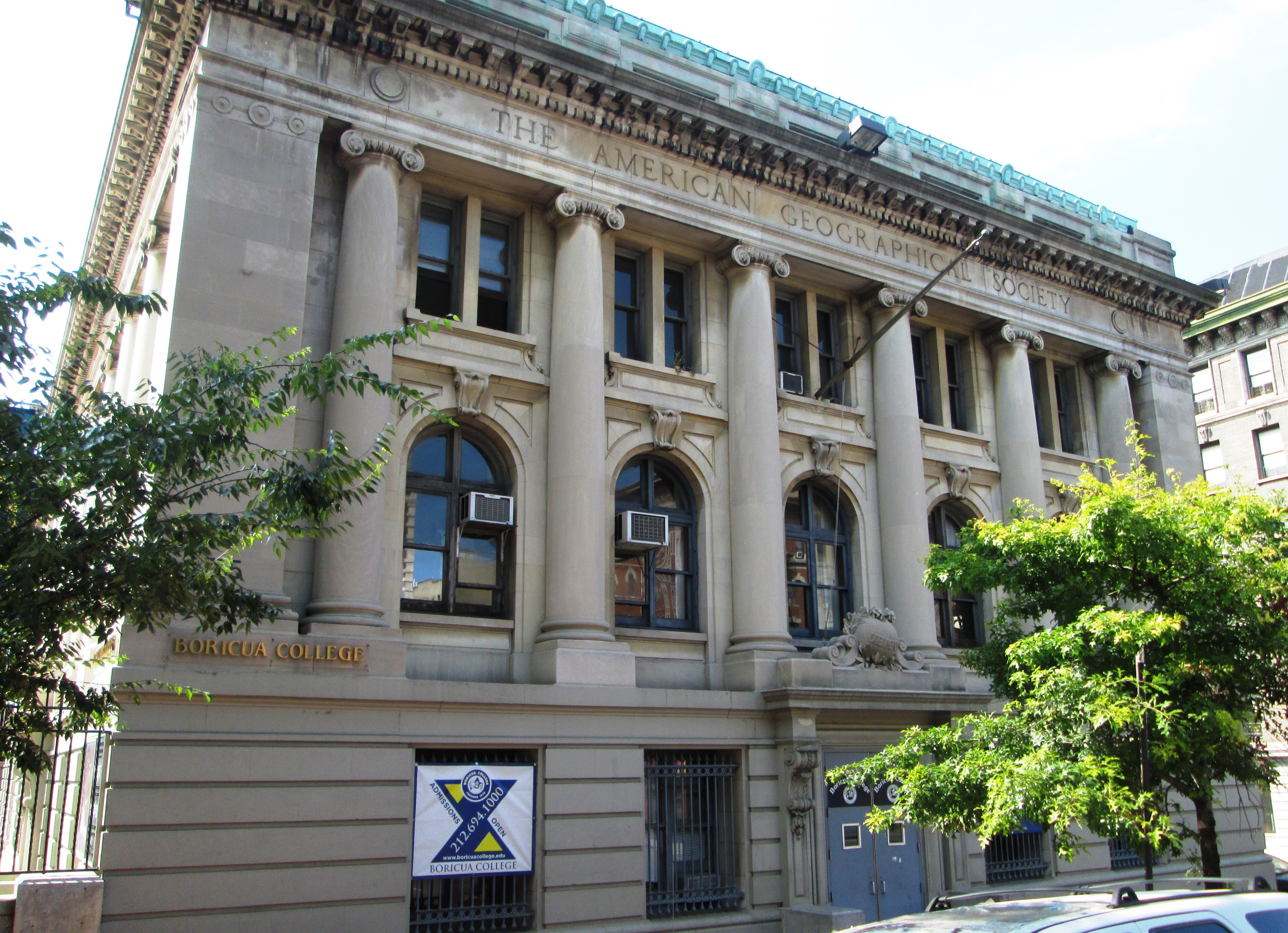
The American Geographic Society building became Boricua College in 1980.

City-operated "culture bus" routes began stopping at Audubon Terrace in 1973, but these failed to attract visitors. The MAI sought to relocate from Audubon Terrace during that decade; its building's poor condition had been exacerbated by flood damage. The MAI was so poorly patronized that, in 1973, it lent items to the Metropolitan Museum of Art on Manhattan's East Side so more visitors could see them; this was its only major exhibit in five years. The AAAL and NIAL merged into the American Academy and Institute of Arts and Letters (AAAL) in 1976 and continued to occupy Audubon Terrace. Also during the decade, the AGS faced severe financial shortages that hindered its ability to maintain its Audubon Terrace building. Accordingly, the AGS moved its collection of items to the University of Wisconsin–Milwaukee in 1978, and its building was repurposed into a campus of Boricua College, a bilingual college. Boricua College began holding classes there in 1980, becoming the complex's first new tenant in five decades.

==== 1980s to 2000s ====
In the 1980s, the MAI's and Hispanic Society's collections were still open to the public, and the ANS and AAAL each had two publicly accessible galleries. Of the institutions at Audubon Terrace, only the MAI charged admission. Visitors continued to be deterred by Audubon Terrace's remoteness from the rest of Manhattan and the perception of high crime. The most-visited museum in the complex was the MAI, which still recorded only 40,000 visitors in 1982, when a single exhibition at the American Museum of Natural History (AMNH) farther south recorded six times as many visitors in four months. The complex had only 50,000 cumulative annual visitors by 1986; one newspaper article wrote that "a museum guard personally escorted a saunterer to the second floor ... to turn on the lights". Despite the seclusion of the complex, all tenants except the MAI planned to stay. AAAL officials said it was not worth the effort and expense to relocate, and ANS officials liked the neighborhood. Hispanic Society officials saw the seclusion of Audubon Terrace as advantageous, though its director and president both refused to reach out to the local Latino community, which they regarded disdainfully.

The Hispanic Society gradually repaired its buildings' roof and murals through the 1980s, and the ANS announced plans in 1987 to raise $4 million for the renovation of its building. (Note: Equivalent to $9,711,000 in 2025) The MAI was still looking to move out, as its building did not have even one-tenth of the exhibition space the museum needed, much less a lobby or a cafeteria. The MAI considered either relocating to Texas or merging with the AMNH; at the time, no more than 10% of the museum's collection could be shown at Audubon Terrace. (Note: Other sources cite Audubon Terrace as displaying 1% or 5% of the MAI's collection.) The Alexander Hamilton U.S. Custom House, at Bowling Green in Lower Manhattan, was offered as an alternative location, while U.S. Senator Daniel Inouye introduced the National Museum of the American Indian Act to bring the collection to Washington, D.C. A compromise was reached in 1988, where the Smithsonian Institution would build the National Museum of the American Indian in Washington, D.C., and move the collection at Audubon Terrace to the Custom House. Local politicians wanted the MAI to retain its Audubon Terrace building, but a museum lawyer said the Smithsonian would likely favor selling the old building to the city government or another cultural institution.

The MAI's George Gustav Heye Center at the Custom House opened for previews in 1992; the old Audubon Terrace building remained open until June 1993, ahead of the Heye Center's full opening the next year. Afterward, the Hispanic Society and Boricua College became involved in a legal dispute over the MAI's old building. The Hispanic Society won out, acquiring the MAI building as an annex for $2.1 million in 1996. The acquisition strained the Hispanic Society's finances, as the society's $1.6 million annual income was insufficient to fund the purchase. To attract visitors, the Hispanic Society also put up information kiosks at the 157th Street subway station, and it also initiated outreach programs to attract the area's Hispanic residents. The annex was to host the Hispanic Society's textiles, along with other items the organization previously could not display, and the society also planned upgrades to its existing buildings, such as climate-control retrofits. Due to funding shortfalls, completion of these upgrades was postponed several years.

By the early 2000s, the MAI's annual visitation had increased twenty times over, compared with before its move to Lower Manhattan. The ANS was similarly considering relocating downtown by 2000. It allocated $16 million to the proposed relocation, even as some members objected, and announced plans in 2001 to open a new location in the Financial District of Lower Manhattan, which opened in 2004. The Hispanic Society planned to follow suit; it was still lightly patronized, with 20–25 thousand annual visitors, and the collection had also outgrown its building. By mid-decade, the ANS had finalized its decision to relocate, and in 2005, the AAAL acquired the ANS building. The Hispanic Society's trustees endorsed the society's relocation the next year. Due to a lack of funds, the Hispanic Society's board canceled its relocation plans in 2007, opting instead to renovate its existing structures; that year, the Dia Art Foundation began using the Hispanic Society buildings. The space between the ANS building and the original AAAL building was converted in 2009 into a glass-clad entrance link for the AAAL buildings. The glass link cost $1.45 million, and the AAAL spent another $300,000 renovating its existing structures.

==== 2010s to present ====
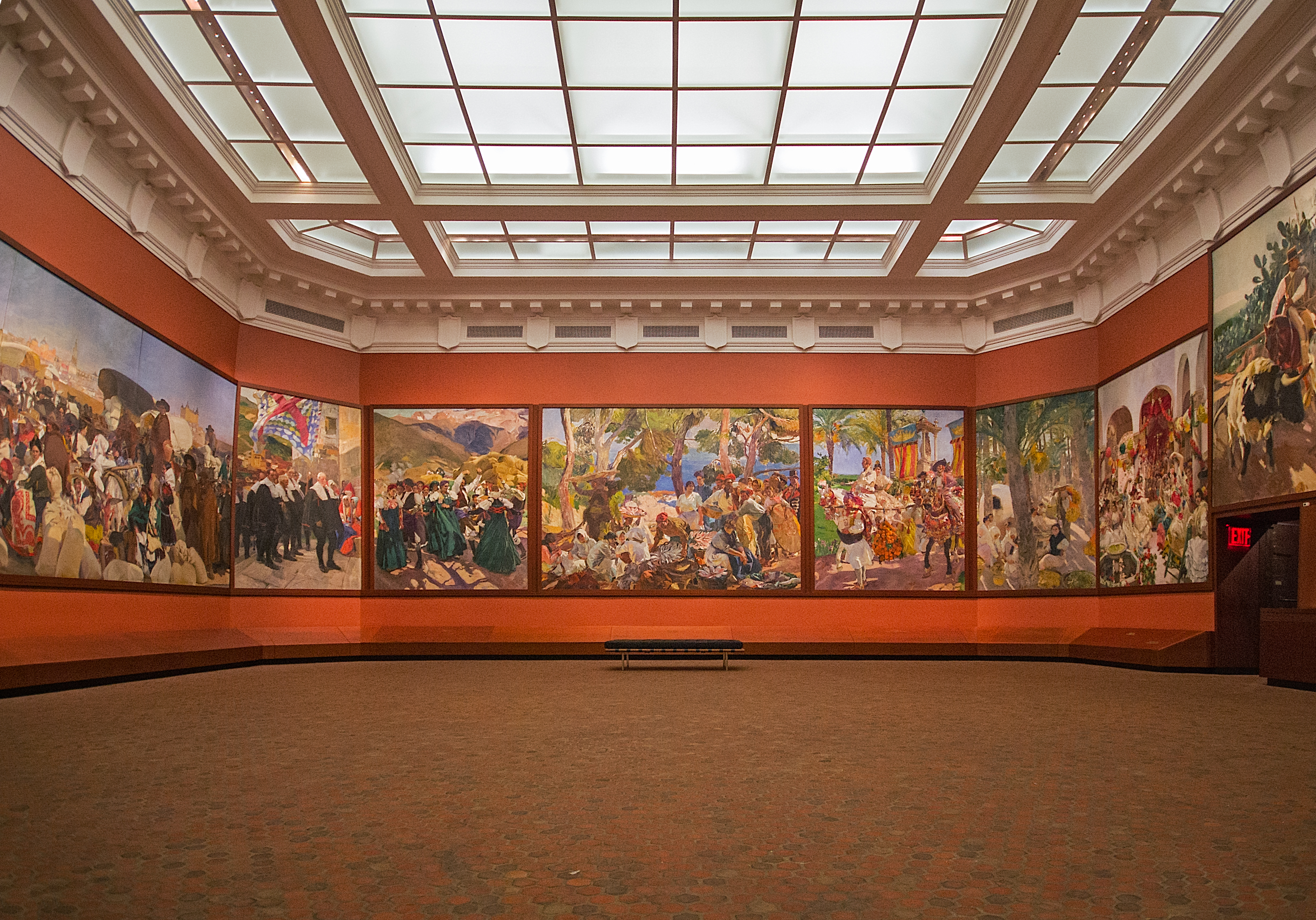
Sorolla room of the Hispanic Society main building, renovated starting in 2017

The Hispanic Society completed a first phase of renovations in 2010 for $5.5 million. The work included restoring the Sorolla Room in its main building and replacing the roof of that room. In that decade, Audubon Terrace remained an insular enclave; the plaza was surrounded almost entirely by the complex's buildings, and the main entrance on Broadway was nondescript. The Hispanic Society had, by 2012, proposed renaming its Audubon Terrace buildings to the Archer M. Huntington Museum of Art, and it continued to suffer from low attendance. The society's buildings lacked space for a cafe or gift shop, and the roof additionally needed repairs. In 2014, the AAAL added a room to its building devoted to the works of the composer Charles Ives. Philippe de Montebello, the chairman of the Hispanic Society, began raising $5 million for further renovations to that building in 2015.

The Hispanic Society also planned a second phase of renovations costing $15 million, much of which was funded by the New York City government. To allow work to take place, the society's galleries at Audubon Terrace closed at the beginning of 2017, leaving Audubon Terrace mostly empty. Annabelle Selldorf Architects and Beyer Blinder Belle were hired to renovate the Hispanic Society buildings. The lighting was replaced, the exterior was repaired, the spaces repainted, a gift shop added, and accessibility and mechanical upgrades carried out. The Hispanic Society building's Nebel doors were restored, and Audubon Terrace's main plaza became wheelchair-accessible. The Hispanic Society buildings hosted exhibits intermittently during their renovation.

The Hispanic Society project was completed in 2023 for $20 million. Due to a labor strike, the buildings' reopening was delayed; they ultimately reopened that June. By then, the AAAL and Hispanic Society were planning events to attract visitors from the surrounding neighborhood. The Hispanic Society added signage to draw attention to the complex, and it began hosting public art in the plaza, starting with Marta Chilindron's Orange Cube 48. In 2024, the AAAL added 10,000 square feet (930 m^{2}) of exhibition space as part of a renovation of its buildings, which were then opened up for community events. Boricua College moved out in 2026.

== Impact and legacy ==
=== Reception ===
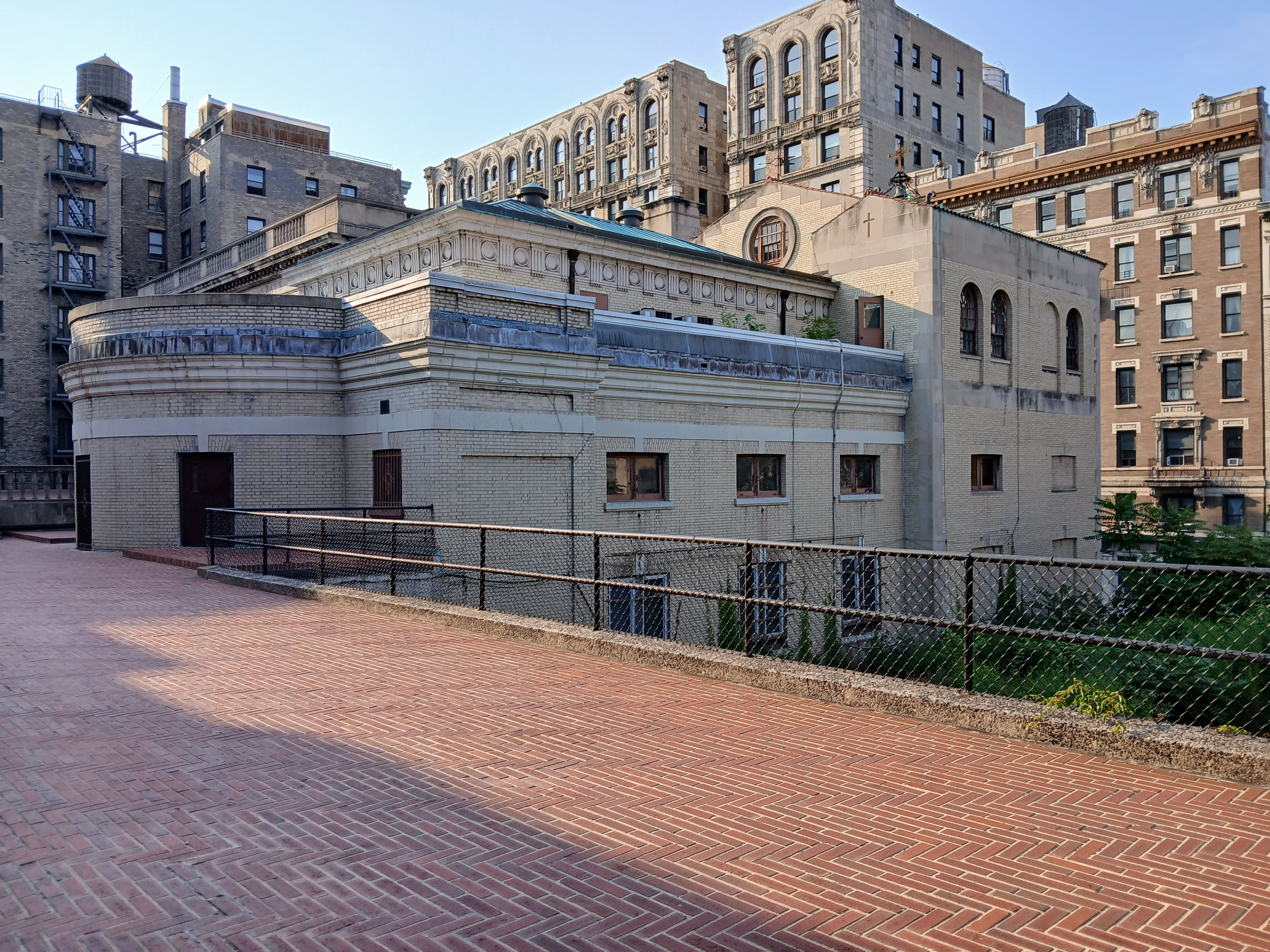
Our Lady of Esperanza Church seen from the upper plaza

With the development of Audubon Terrace's first buildings, The Cincinnati Enquirer said in 1909 that the Huntington family were trying to establish a "scholastic character [...] upon the plot west of Broadway, between [155th] and [156th] streets". The New York Times regarded the complex in 1911 as "a beautiful group of buildings", and The Christian Science Monitor wrote in 1916 that the complex had been made possible "through the liberality and efforts of Mr. Huntington". In 1923, the New-York Tribune called Audubon Terrace "the finest architecture of any buildings in the world". A Times writer in 1927 called Audubon Terrace "a uniform group in a neo-classical style around a paved court with a terrace" and said it was strongly associated with the Hispanic Society and Archer Huntington, despite the varied subjects of the collections. The New York Herald Tribune, writing in 1962, compared the complex to a Roman forum and the Hispanic Museum building in particular to the Alhambra, and another writer in 1969 said the buildings gave the neighborhood "the look of Paris as seen through a shabby filter".

In 1983, Robert A. M. Stern wrote that the complex represented "perhaps the grandest attempt to synthesize the artistic and philosophical goals of the American Renaissance". Also during the 1980s, writers contrasted the buildings' neoclassical architecture with the dilapidated neighborhood, and The New York Times said the complex would have garnered more attention in a smaller city. A commentator said in 1997 that visiting Audubon Terrace's plaza was "a journey back in time", and Newsday wrote the next year that the complex was like a Roman ruin or an "over-the-top American interpretation of a Renaissance courtyard". In the early 21st century, commentators described the Beaux-Arts design as elegant. Jason Sheftell, writing about Audubon Park and Audubon Terrace for the New York Daily News in 2009, said that "history comes alive in this neighborhood of curved buildings sporting faux turrets and a Greek revival university square". A commentator in The New Criterion wrote in 2014 the complex had been Archer Huntington's "great and distinctly American cultural vision". The New York Times referred to the complex as "an august assemblage of neo-Italian Renaissance structures" in 2023, and another commentator the next year likened the complex to a simulacrum of a 16th-century Spanish courtyard. Architectural writer Ariella Budick wrote in 2026 that Audubon Terrace's design made it seem as though visitors had "slipped free of New York".

From an urban planning perspective, Harvey K. Flad wrote that Audubon Terrace had "held many of the elements of the 'power of place"' that [the writer Dolores Hayden] ascribed to structures in the urban fabric". The individual buildings also received commentary. The Brooklyn Daily Eagle wrote that the Hispanic Society's main building was "one of the most beautiful buildings of New York City", while another writer called that building "a delight to the eye". A writer for Puck said in 1914 that the Hispanic Society building "would be an objective shrine for passionate pilgrims" had it been built in Europe. The Church of Our Lady of Esperanza was described as "delicately beautiful and complete in every detail, both artistic and ecclesiastical".

=== Landmark designations ===
The New York City Landmarks Preservation Commission (LPC) proposed designating the Audubon Terrace complex as a landmark in 1966 and again in 1978; the designation was approved in January 1979. The landmark status commemorated Audubon Terrace's influence as a "significant example of civic planning", being a rare example of an early-20th-century American cultural complex outside a university campus. Audubon Terrace became one of several city historic districts in Upper Manhattan (along with the Jumel Terrace, Mount Morris Park, and St. Nicholas districts) and, upon its designation, was the smallest New York City historic district. The buildings had been unofficial landmarks in the neighborhood for several years before the LPC's action. The LPC designation afforded the complex formal protection, albeit only for the physical architecture, and did not prevent the institutions' relocations.

The complex was added to the New York State Register of Historic Places in 1980 and listed on the National Register of Historic Places (NRHP) as a historic district the same year. All the buildings in the complex are contributing properties to another NRHP district, the Audubon Park Historic District, which was listed in 2024. The Hispanic Society main building, its library, and the plaza are also individually listed on the NRHP as contributing properties to a National Historic Landmark designation granted to the Hispanic Society in 2012; the former MAI building is a non-contributing property to that designation.

== See also ==
- List of New York City Designated Landmarks in Manhattan above 110th Street
- National Register of Historic Places listings in Manhattan above 110th Street
- Audubon Mural Project
