= Our Lady of Esperanza Church =

Catholic church in New York City

Church of Our Lady of Esperanza
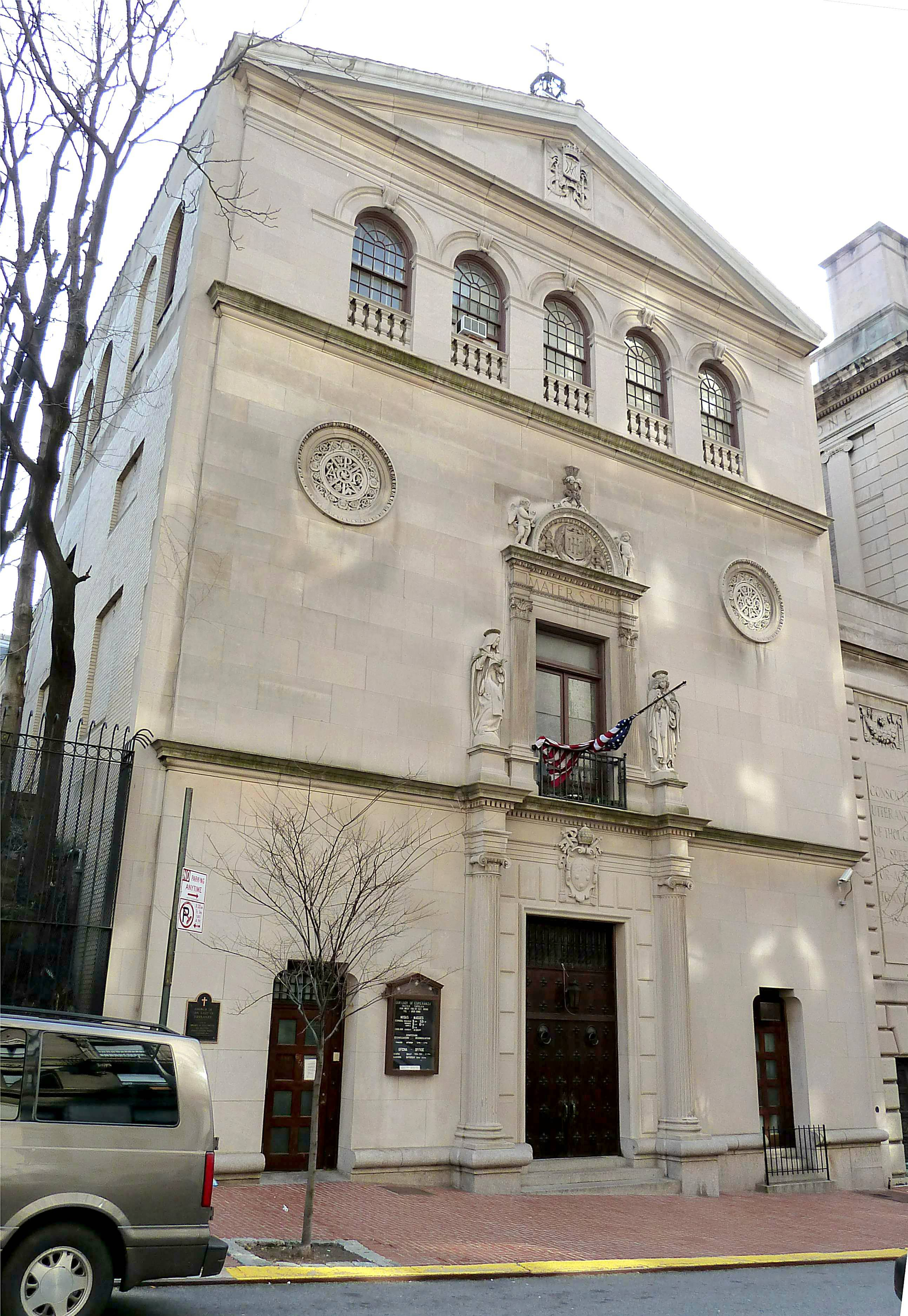
- 156th Street facade (2011)
- Interactive map of the Church of Our Lady of Esperanza area

General information
- Architectural style: Beaux-Arts/American Renaissance
- Location: New York, New York, United States of America
- Coordinates: 40°50′2″N 73°56′49.2″W
- Construction started: 1909
- Completed: 1912
- Renovated: 1924 (addition & remodeling)
- Cost: $50,000
- Client: Roman Catholic Archdiocese of New York

Technical details
- Structural system: masonry

Design and construction
- Architect: Charles P. Huntington

Renovating team
- Architect: Lawrence G. White of McKim, Mead & White

Website
- ourladyofesperanza.org

The Church of Our Lady of Esperanza is a Roman Catholic parish church in the Roman Catholic Archdiocese of New York, located at 624 West 156th Street between Broadway and Riverside Drive in the Washington Heights neighborhood of Upper Manhattan in New York City.

The church is part of Audubon Terrace, which was designated a Historic District by the New York City Landmarks Preservation Commission on January 9, 1979, but it is organizationally separate from the museum complex.

== Architecture ==
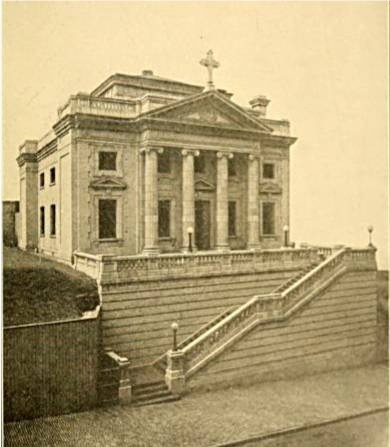
156th Street facade c. 1921, showing Charles P. Huntington's original design with the stairway entrance

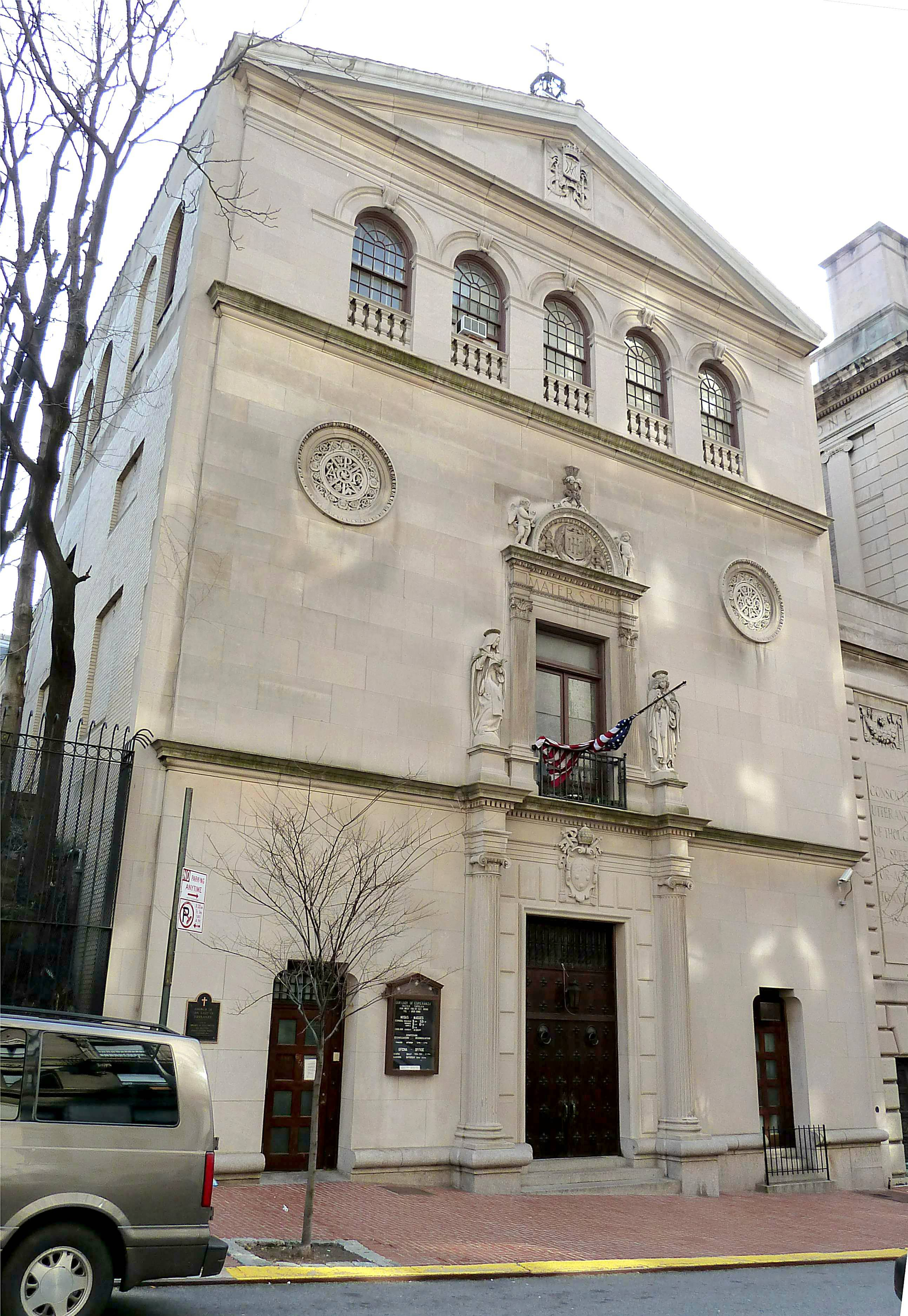
Post-1920s design of Our Lady of Esperanza Church, seen from 156th Street

Our Lady of Esperanza Church is located at 624 West 156th Street, between the Hispanic Society Library to the east and the American Academy of Arts and Letters auditorium to the west. It is an Italian Renaissance-style building completed in 1912, with an addition and remodeling in 1924 by Lawrence G. White, Stanford White's son. Unlike all the other buildings in Audubon Terrace, the church faces outward toward the street, rather than inward toward the plaza; it lacks any entrance from the plaza. As built, it functioned as a chapel. As expanded, the church is three and a half stories high.

The facade is made of limestone or stucco. It is spanned by string courses that split it horizontally into three tiers, and it measures three bays wide. There was originally an outdoor brick staircase, which ascended to an Ionic portico; this stair was moved indoors during White's renovation. At ground level are three granite steps ascending to a group of three wooden doorways. The main entrance is located in the center and consists of a double door with Ionic columns on either side. There are single doors on either side of the central doorway, which are recessed and are made of wood and glass. The second floor has a French door flanked by Corinthian pilasters in the central bays, as well as medallions in the side bays; the third floor has balustrades and arched colonnades. At the roofline is a pediment with a crown and shield motif, behind which is a dome with Spanish tiles, a central bell-and-cross motif, and a skylight. The side elevations are made of brick, and the rear elevation is curved.

The interior, originally seating 500, had a terrazzo floor along with wood, marble, and plaster decorations. A yellow and green color palette was used inside. There was also a Siena marble altar and a painting by Joaquín Sorolla. The modern interior is illuminated by the skylight on the dome.

== History ==
The parish was founded by Dona Manuela de Laverrerie de Barril, the wife of the Spanish Consul-General in New York. Archer Milton Huntington, the railroad heir and founder of the Hispanic Society of America, was recruited to the cause and funded the project for the second Spanish-speaking Catholic church in New York. The church building was begun in 1909 to designs by Archer's cousin, Charles P. Huntington. The building was enlarged and extended in 1924 by Lawrence G. White, including an addition on 156th Street. Previously, the entrance to the church, which sat on a hill, was by way of an outdoor brick stairway with terra cotta balustrades, but White's addition allowed for an entrance at the street level, with the climb to the church occurring via an indoor staircase.

The first pastor, in 1912, was the Rev. Adrian Buisson, formerly pastor of the Church of Our Lady of Guadalupe at 229 West 14th Street. Upon his retirement in 1952, the Rev. Francis Soutberg "was appointed Pastor until 1955 when Father Bernard Guillett assumed the position. Presently the Reverend Monsignor Peter O'Donnell is pastor."

== Sources ==
- Audubon Park Historic District (Report). National Register of Historic Places, National Park Service. November 4, 2024. Report hosted on cris.parks.ny.gov (On "Search" tab: Criteria → Lookup → National Register number: 24NR00026 → NR Nomination Form).
- Audubon Terrace Historic District (PDF) (Report). New York City Landmarks Preservation Commission. 1979.
- White, Norval; Willensky, Elliot; Leadon, Fran (2010). AIA Guide to New York City (5th ed.). New York: Oxford University Press. ISBN 978-0-19538-386-7.
