= Boricua College =

Private college in New York City

Coordinates: 40.82276°N 73.91149°W

- Motto: A tradition of learning
- Type: Private
- Established: 1974
- Affiliations: NAICU, MSA
- President: Victor G. Alicea
- Faculty: 37
- Students: 516 (FA 2024)
- Undergraduates: 391
- Postgraduates: 125
- Location: New York City, New York, United States
- Campus: Urban
- Mascot: Lion
- Website: www.boricuacollege.edu

Boricua College is a private college in New York City designed to serve the educational needs of Puerto Ricans and other Latinos in the United States.

== History ==
In 1970, Antonia Pantoja created the Puerto Rican Research and Resource Center in Washington, D.C. Through the center, Pantoja co-founded and became the president of the Universidad Boricua, which later evolved into Boricua College. Along with Pantoja, the college was founded by educators and community organizers including Victor G. Alicea, Mildred Rodriguez, Francisco G. Ortiz and Héctor A. Santiago.

In 1974, Victor Alicea was appointed president of the college and has remained in that role ever since. During its first year, degrees were awarded through a partnership with Brooklyn College and Union Institute & University.

Boricua College was charterd by the New York State Education Department in 1975 to award Associate of Arts Degrees and in 1979 was also permitted to award Bachelor of Science degrees.

In January 2000 President Bill Clinton visited the Brooklyn campus at its Graham Avenue learning center to inaugurate a Small Business Association at the college.

== Accreditation ==
Boricua College has been accredited by the Middle States Association of Colleges and Schools since 1980.

Boricua College's education programs were accredited by the Council for the Accreditation of Educator Preparation from 2014 to 2021. Since 2025, their education programs are accredited by the Association for Advancing Quality in Educator Preparation (AAQEP).

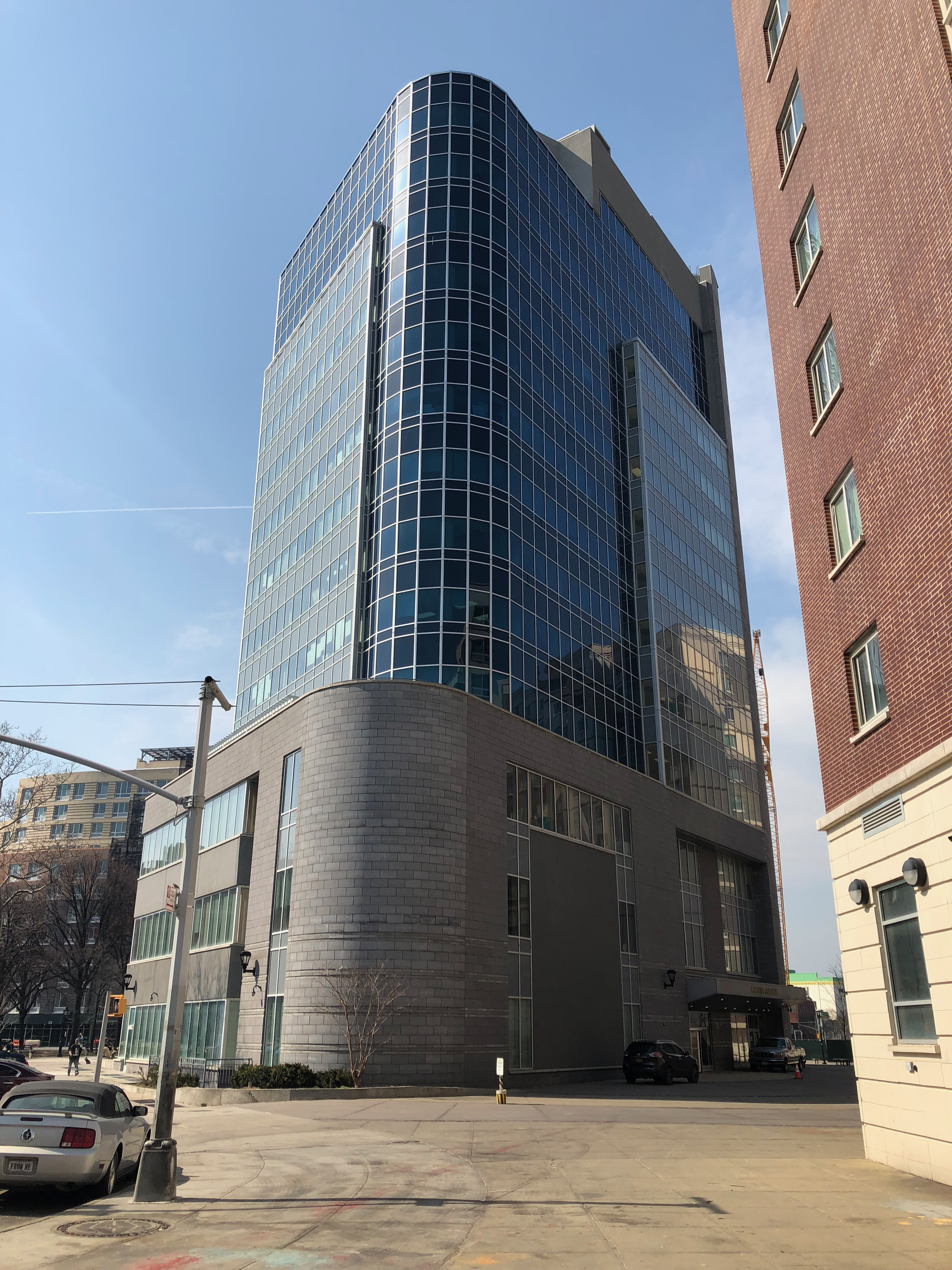
Boricua College Tower in The Bronx

== Campuses ==
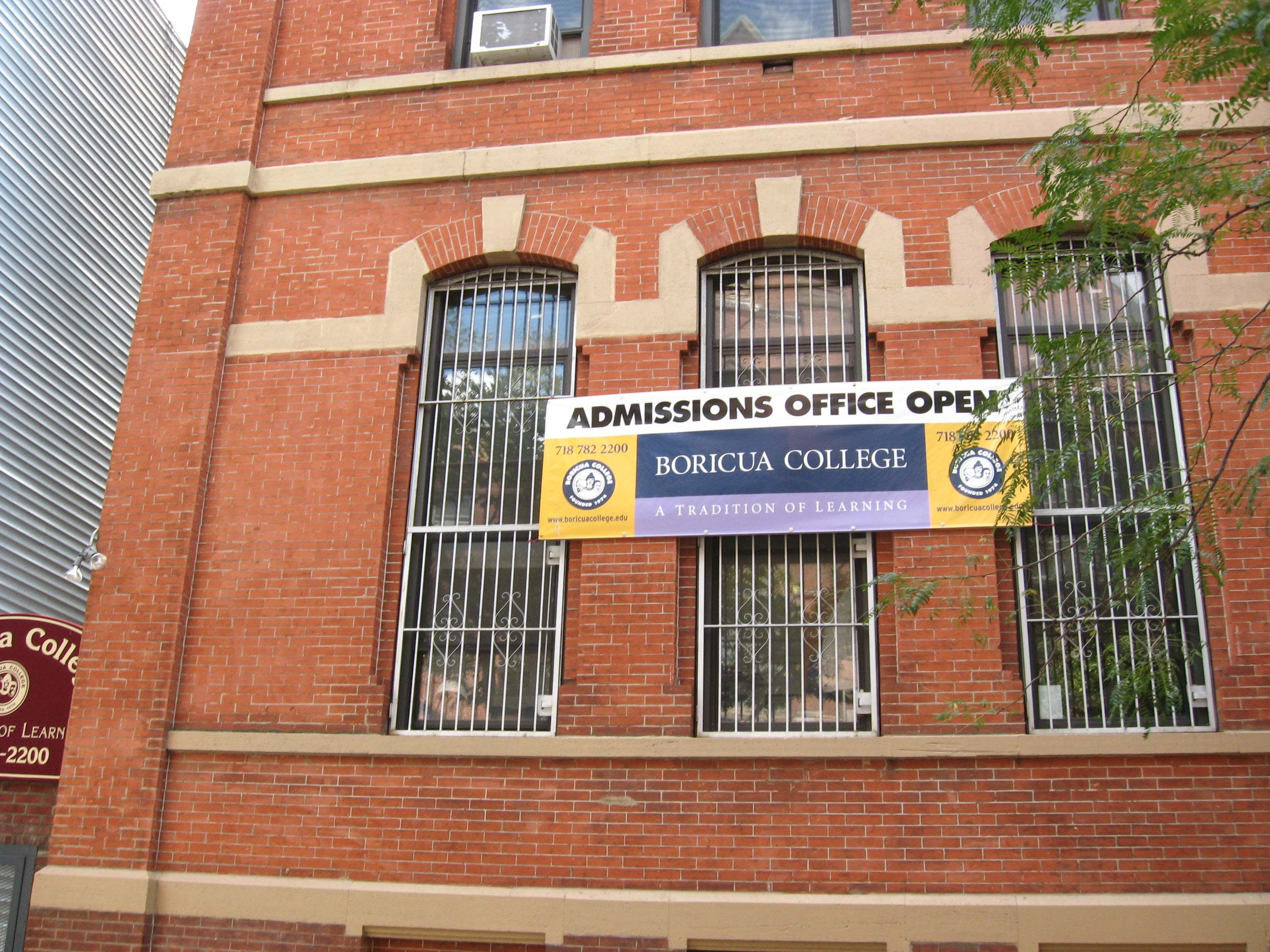
Former location at North 6th Street, Williamsburg

The college has two campuses, including its original campus in East Williamsburg, Brooklyn. The college opened a campus in the Bronx in 2013.

It previously had a location in Williamsburg, Brooklyn but sold the building in 2018. Boricua's Audubon Terrace, Washington Heights, Manhattan campus closed at the end of July 2026.

== Faculty ==
The school employs a largely bilingual faculty of 23 full-time and 14 part-time members.

According to its 2014 Self-Study Report to the Middle States Association of Colleges and Schools, in fall 2012–13, more than 90% of its faculty are Latino.

== Student body and graduation ==
Its student body is 79% adult (over 25 years old with family responsibilities), which characterizes it as a non-traditional college. In his book Access to Freedom, James Hall explains that these kinds of colleges cater to adult, working students who may take longer than the six years taken by traditional students to graduate.

Boricua College's four year graduation rate for students who entered in 2016 is 48%.

=== Notable alumni ===
- Félix Ortiz, (BS, 1983), former New York State Assemblyman and Assistant Speaker of the New York State Assembly.
- Robert Torres (stage name Sabor Latino), Hip Hop artist and author
