= William M. Kendall =

American architect (1856–1941)

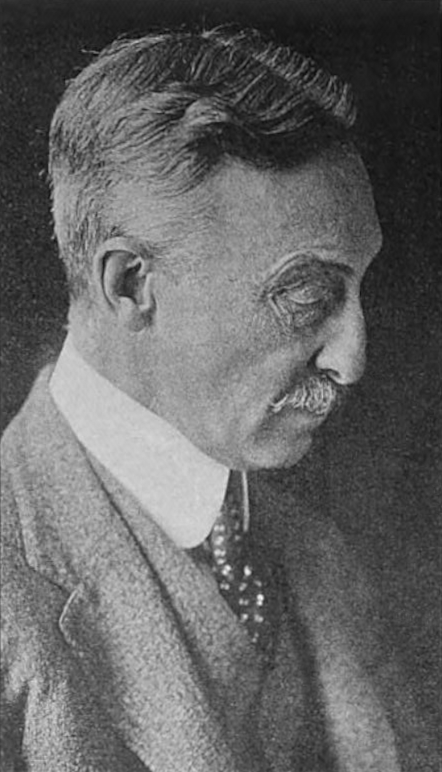
- Born: William Mitchell Kendall; February 13, 1856; Jamaica Plain, Massachusetts, US
- Died: August 8, 1941 (aged 85); Bar Harbor, Maine, US
- Education: Harvard University; Massachusetts Institute of Technology
- Occupation: Architect

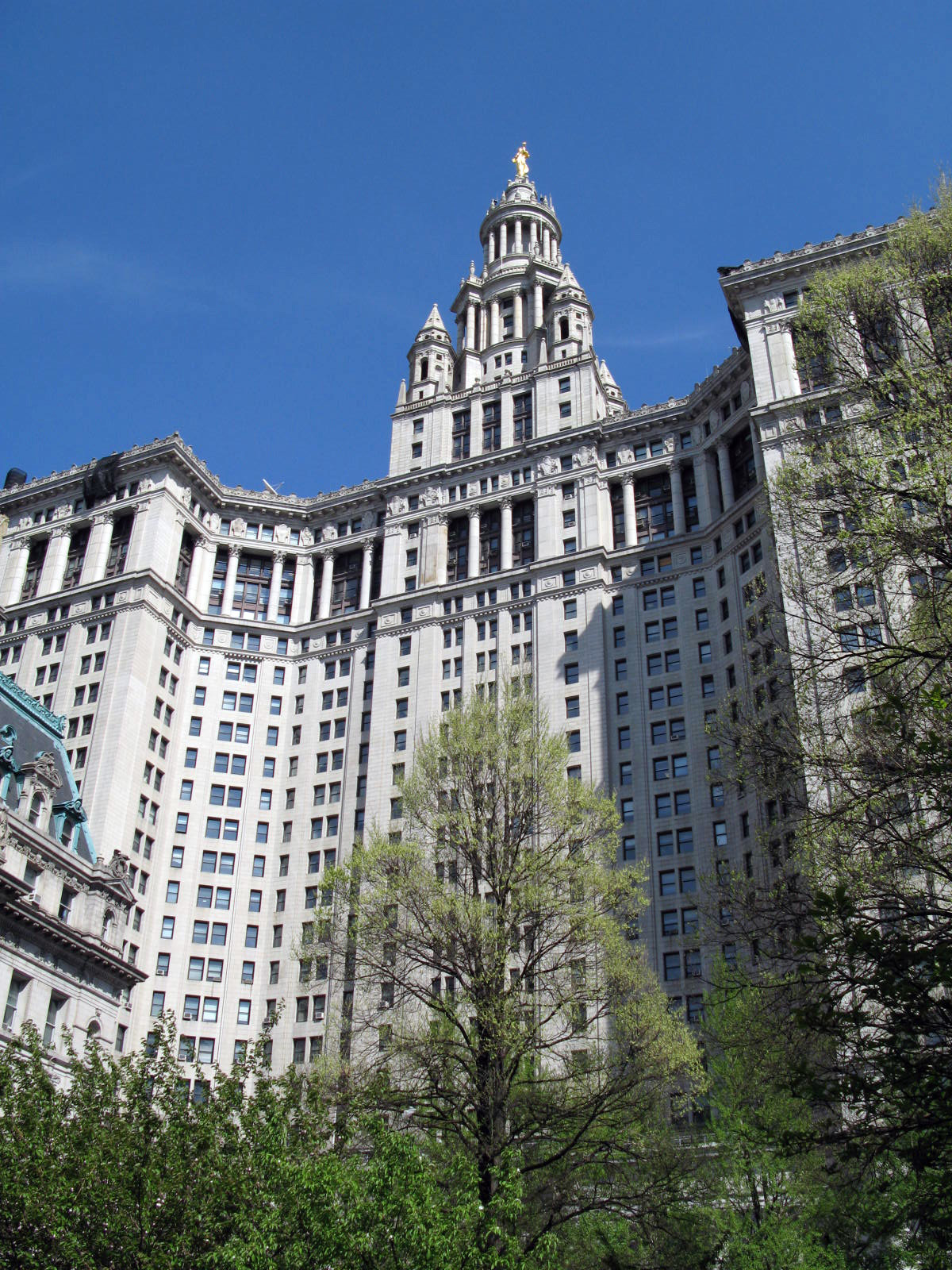
Manhattan Municipal Building (1914)

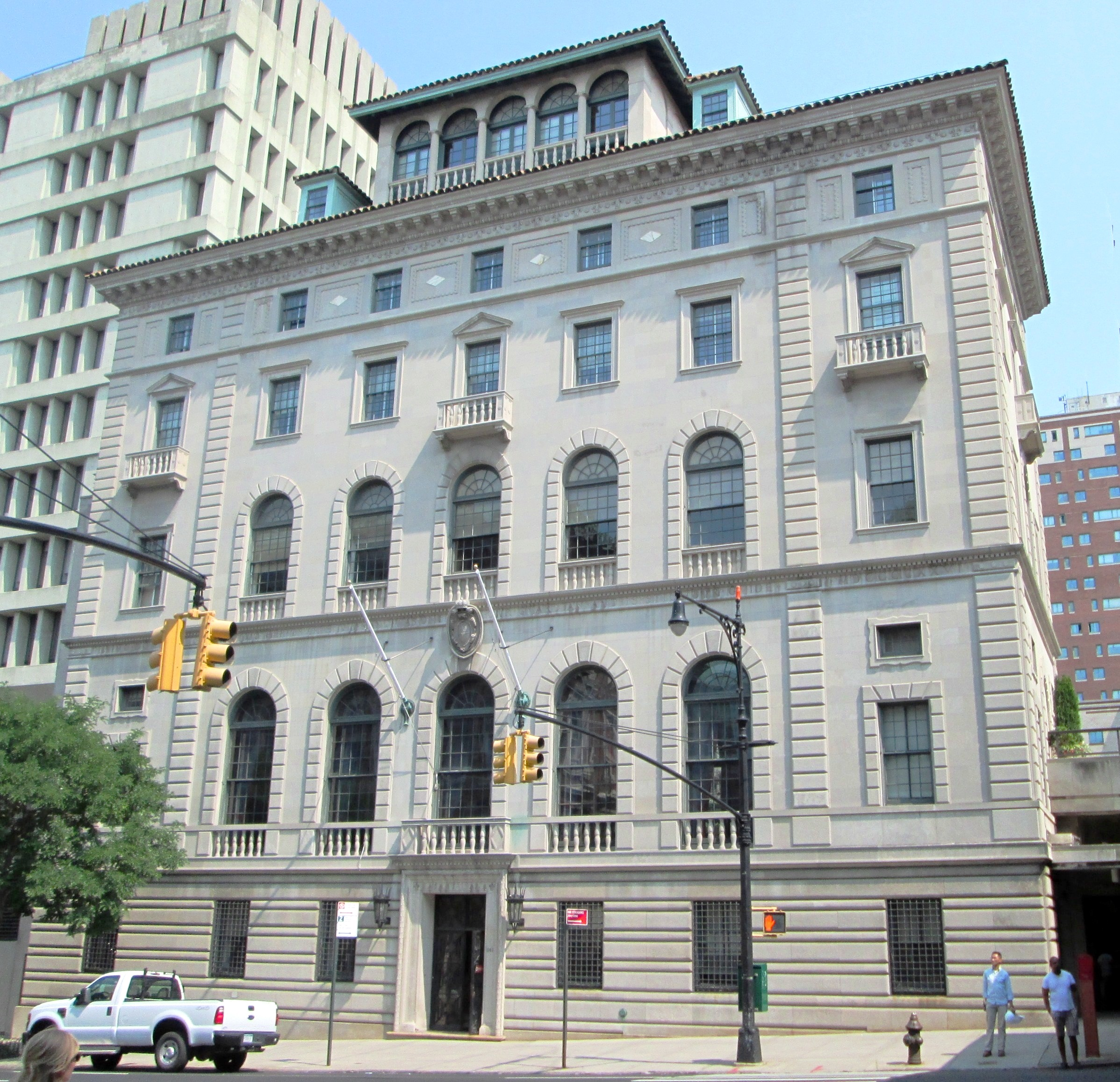
Columbia University's Casa Italiana (1927)

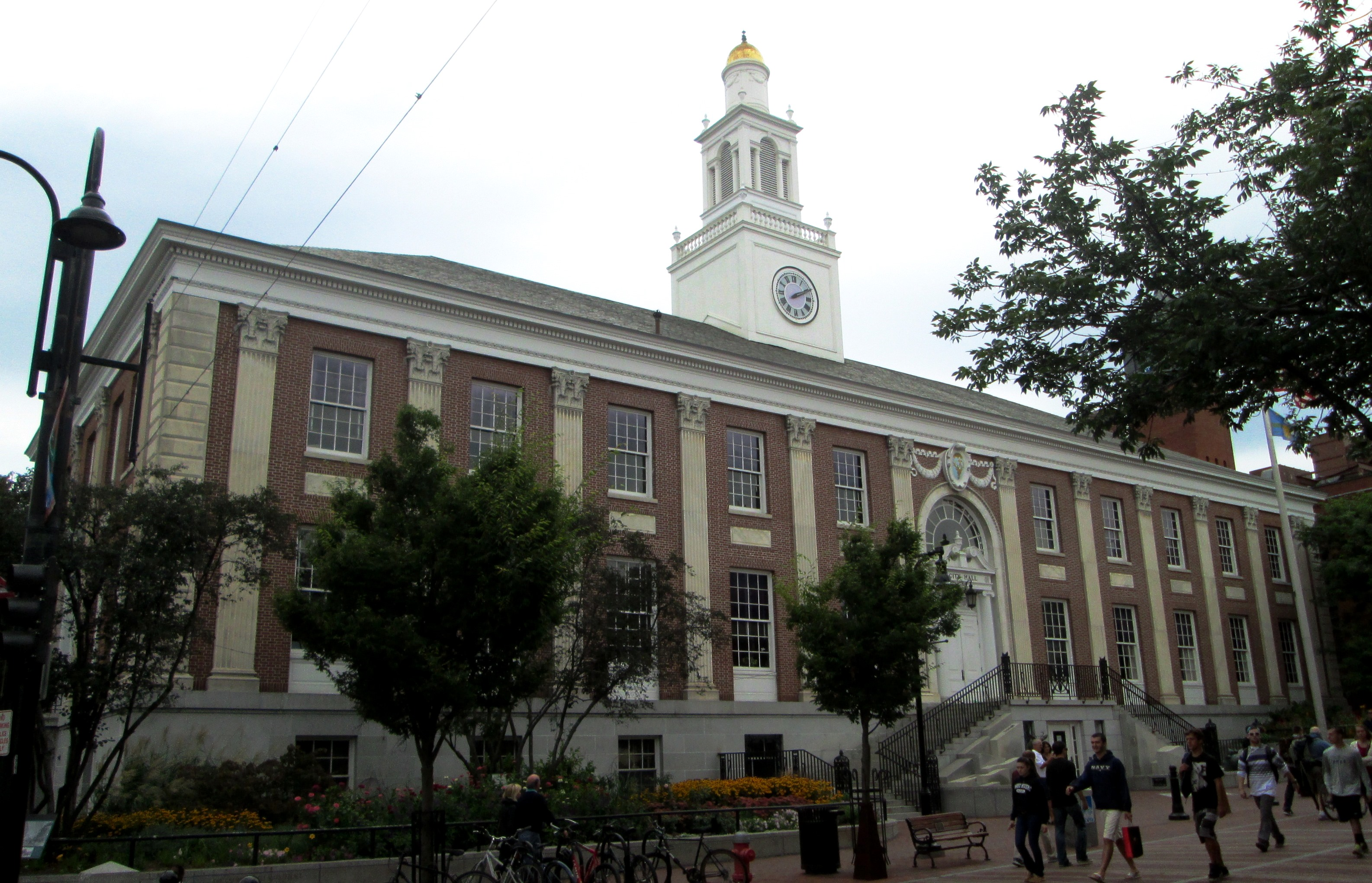
City Hall in Burlington, Vermont (1928)

William Mitchell Kendall (February 13, 1856 – August 8, 1941) was an American architect who spent his career with the New York firm of McKim, Mead & White, the leading American architectural practice at the turn of the century, renowned for its classical work. Kendall joined the firm in 1882, became a partner in 1906, and remained with the firm until his death in 1941. He was closely associated at the firm with partner Charles Follen McKim until McKim's death in 1909, and added a refined delicacy to McKim's somewhat severe Roman classicism.

== Education and career ==
Born in Jamaica Plain, Massachusetts, Kendall received his undergraduate degree from Harvard University in 1876, studied at the Massachusetts Institute of Technology (MIT) from 1876 to 1878, and completed a year of travel and study in France and Italy. In 1882, Kendall joined the firm of McKim, Mead & White where he worked on many significant buildings, including the Morgan Library, the Low Memorial Library and other buildings at Columbia University, the Washington Square Arch, Bellevue Hospital, and the Main Post Office (James Farley Post Office), all in New York City; Arlington Memorial Bridge, the Army War College, and the restoration of St. John's Episcopal Church, in Washington, D.C.; the American Academy in Rome; and the Harvard University School of Business, many of the Harvard gates, and the Plymouth Rock Memorial (Pilgrim Memorial State Park), in Massachusetts. It was Kendall who proposed inscribing the quotation from Herodotus on the frieze of the New York Post Office: "Neither snow nor rain nor heat nor gloom of night stays these couriers from the swift completion of their appointed rounds." Kendall became a partner of McKim, Mead & White in 1906.

Kendall served on the U.S. Commission of Fine Arts from 1916 to 1921, and was a member of its Committee for the Beautification of Permanent American Military Cemeteries in France and England, which traveled to inspect proposed sites and subsequently recommended architectural treatment for the America's European war cemeteries. In the 1920s, he designed war memorials at several of the cemeteries.

== Memberships and associations ==
Kendall was a fellow of the American Institute of Architects (AIA), whose New York chapter awarded him its Medal of Honor, conferred in 1928 for "distinguished work and high professional standing".

Kendall was a member of the National Institute of Arts and Letters and was elected to the American Academy of Arts and Letters; served as a trustee of the American Academy in Rome; was a member of the Society of Mayflower Descendants; and served on the 1934 Prix de Rome jury with architects Louis Ayres and John Russell Pope.

Kendall was a member of the Century Association and University Club in New York.

He died in Bar Harbor, Maine on August 8, 1941.
