= Low-iron glass =

Type of high-clarity glass

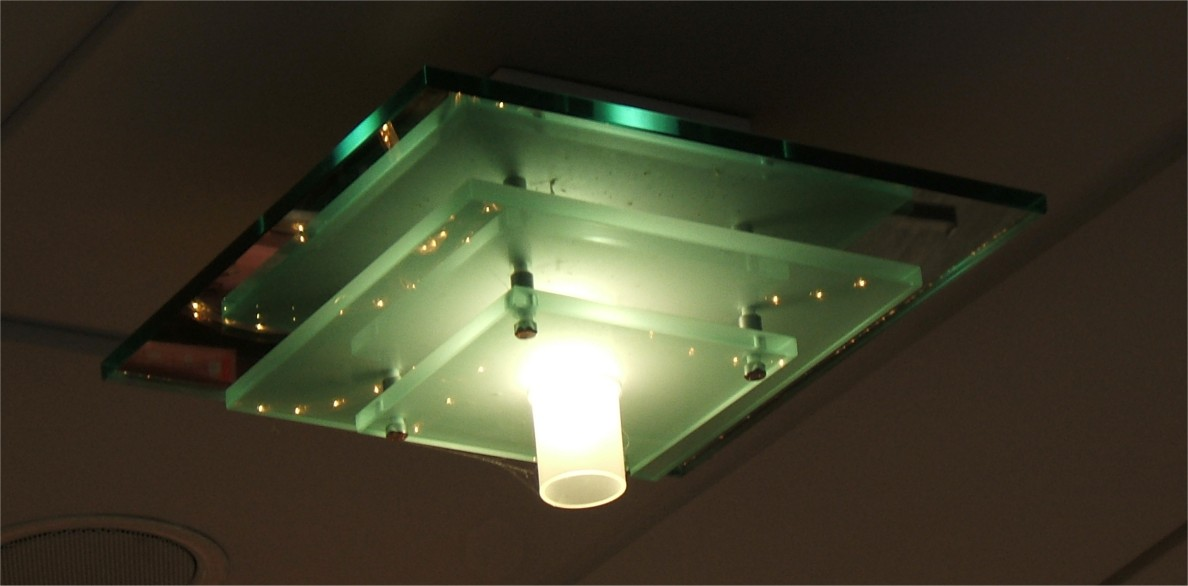
The greenish tint of this float glass is from iron impurities. Low-iron glass does not exhibit this color.

Low-iron glass is a type of high-clarity glass that is made from silica with very low amounts of iron. This low level of iron removes the greenish-blue tint that can be seen especially on larger and thicker sizes of glass. Low-iron glass is used for aquariums, display cases, some windows, and other applications where clarity is desired.

Low-iron glass typically has a ferric oxide content of about 0.01%. Ordinary plate glass has about 10 times as much iron content. Low-iron glass is made from low-iron silica sand. In the United States, the primary sources for such sand are in Wisconsin.

Fallingwater, a house designed by Frank Lloyd Wright and built in 1939, was one of the first houses to use low-iron glass for windows.

Low iron glass is widely used in solar panels.

Low-iron glass is sold under various brand names. Guardian Industries calls it "UltraClear" or "Ultrawhite". Pilkington calls it "Optiwhite". Vitro calls it "Starphire". Other brand names include "Starlite", "Krystal Klear", "Diamant" and "Eurowhite".
