= Charles Pratt Huntington =

American architect (1871–1919)

- c. 1918
- Born: November 22, 1871; Logansport, Indiana, US
- Died: October 15, 1919 (aged 47); Bronxville, New York, US
- Education: Harvard University (1893); École nationale supérieure des Beaux-Arts (1901)
- Occupation: Architect
- Spouses: Maude Mary Bayly (m. 1894; div. 1913) Eleanor Moretti (m. 1913)
- Design: Audubon Terrace

Charles Pratt Huntington (1871–1919) was an American architect.

== Biography ==
At Harvard, c. 1893

Charles Pratt Huntington was born in Logansport, Indiana and educated at Harvard University, from which he graduated in 1893, and the École nationale supérieure des Beaux-Arts in Paris, from which he graduated in 1901.

He later moved to New York City, where he designed Audubon Terrace and several of its original buildings for his cousin Archer M. Huntington in the early 20th century. He was a member of the American Institute of Architects from 1911 to 1914.

He married Maude Mary Bayly in Florence on May 5, 1894, and they had one daughter. They divorced in June 1913, and he remarried to Eleanor Moretti in New York City on September 11 of that year.

He died at Lawrence Hospital in Bronxville, New York on October 15, 1919.

== Notable works ==
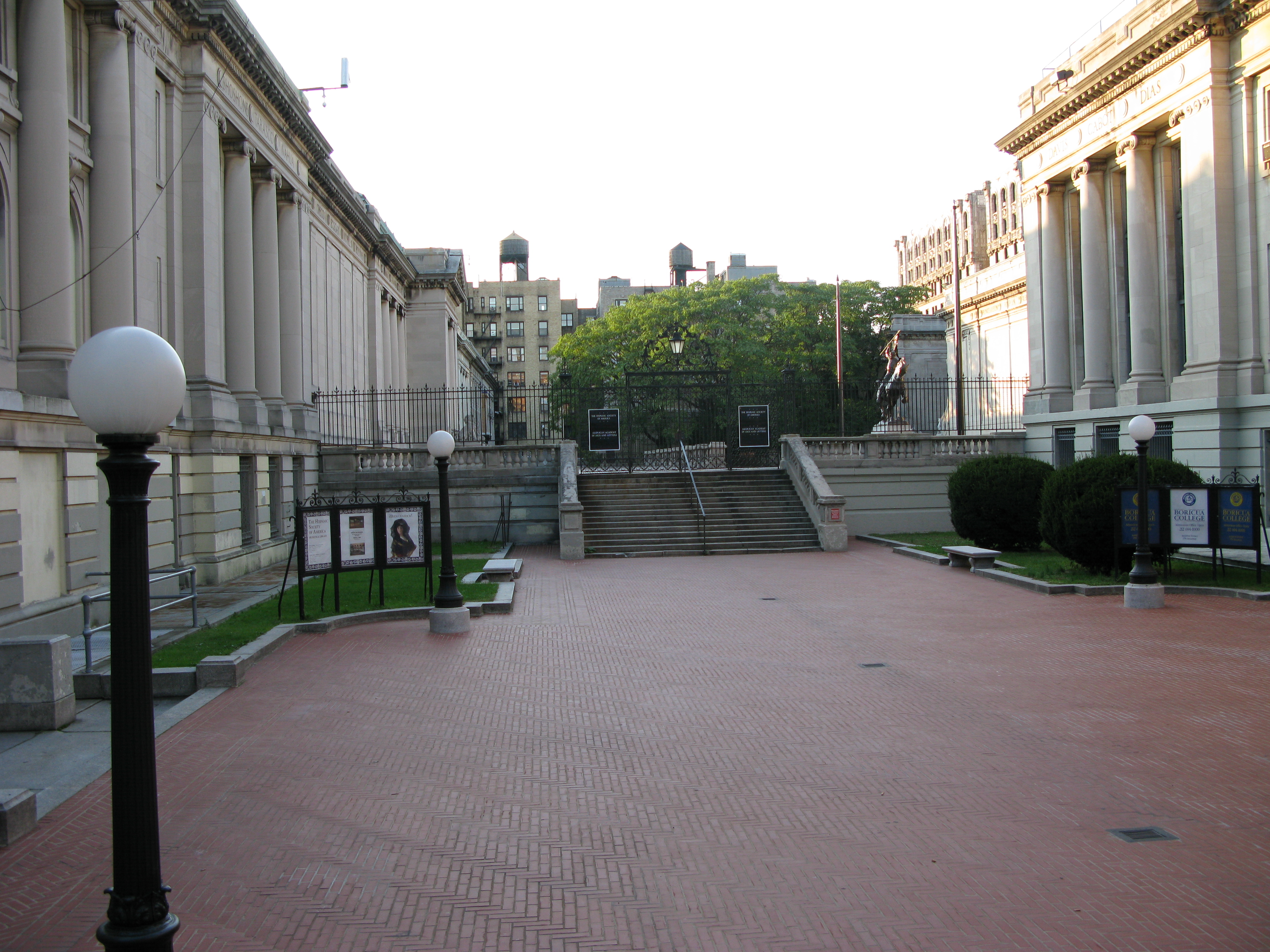
Audubon Terrace, photographed 2008
