= Tom Sanford (artist) =

American artist

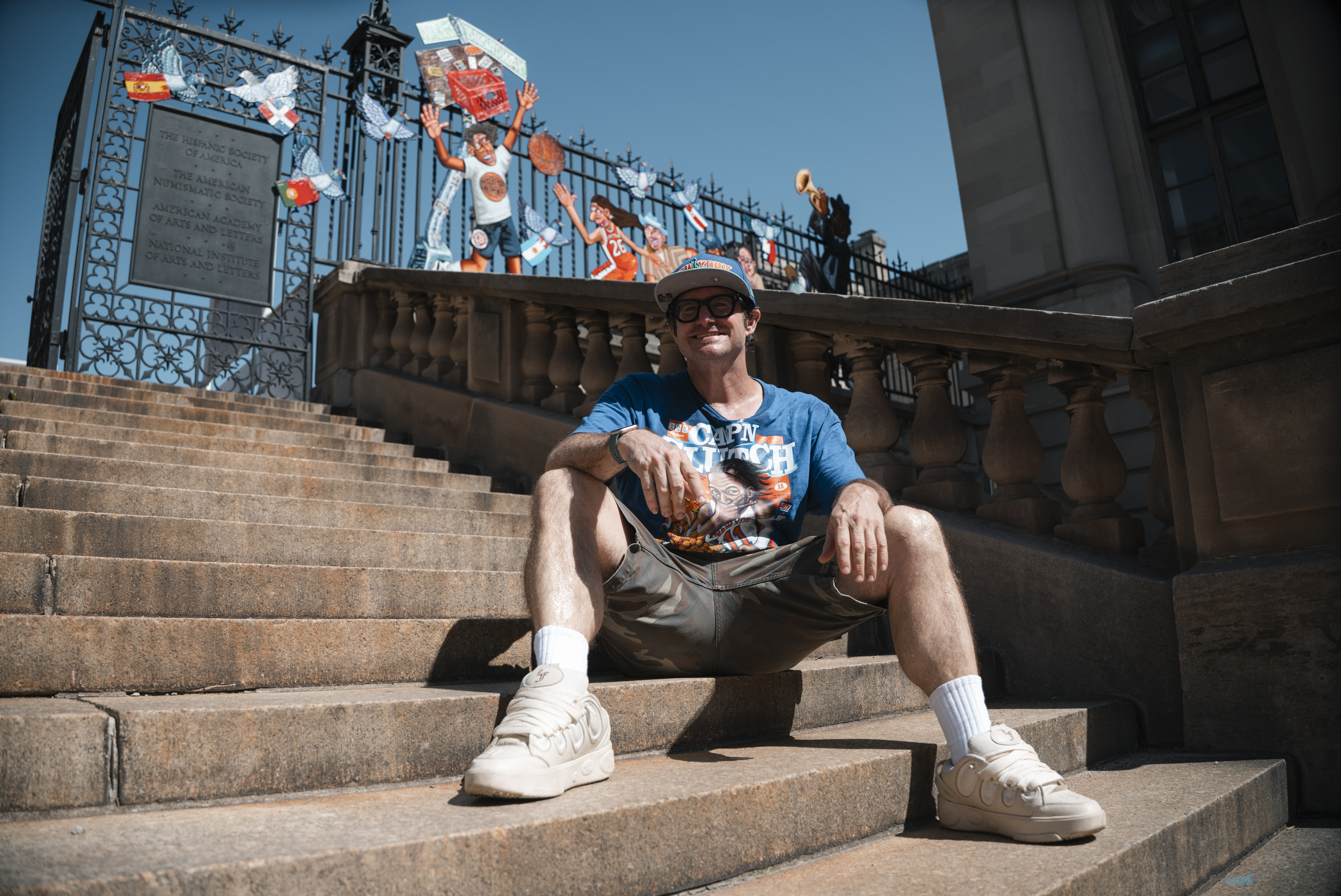
- Tom Sanford in front of Uptown Visions at Hispanic Society, NYC. photo: Alfonso Lozano
- Born: 1975 (age 50–51); Bronxville, New York, U.S.

Tom Sanford is an American artist from New York City, who is known for his vibrant pop-surrealist paintings on canvas and wooden cutout installations that portray vignettes from historical events and popular culture with a specific focus on New York City's cultural and quotidian life. Sanford has been called the “unofficial Knicks artist” for his team-inspired paintings and life-sized wooden player cutouts, which were featured at City Hall during the New York Knicks’ 2026 championship run. Sanford lives and works in West Harlem, New York.

== Early life and education ==
Sanford was born in Bronxville, New York in 1975. His family moved to London, England when he was three and he attended primary school there. The family later returned to the United States, where Sanford attended middle and high school. He studied at Columbia University, receiving a Bachelors of Arts in 1998, and a Masters of Fine Arts from Hunter College in 2006. Initially, Sanford considered majoring in economics, but a class with visual arts professor Archie Rand persuaded him to focus on visual art. Sanford worked as an artist's assistant to Alexis Rockman and Deborah Kass.

== Style ==
Sanford's style recalls the vibrant and bold colors and quotidian details of pop art with stylized caricature-esque figures and scenes from both modern and contemporary culture. His paintings have been discussed within the context of the history painting genre, although Sanford's depictions are largely influenced by his experiences and interests within contemporary life.

== Artwork and career ==
Memory and experience play a key role in Sanford's artwork, which includes people, places, and events that hold significance in his life. New York City is a frequently depicted subject, and Sanford has painted a spectrum of city life, including professional athletes, musicians, fellow visual artists, and archetypal everyday people who represent the city's cultural diversity.

Sanford has exhibited his work in numerous art galleries and museums internationally. He has also painted and displayed murals and tableaux installations in public spaces throughout New York City; including contributing to the Audubon Mural Project and Art on Audubon Terrace program.

Additionally, Sanford has received commissions to make art for trendy New York City establishments, such as Cortney Bond's Lower Upper Side bar, Not A Speakeasy (closed in 2025); and her Lower East Side nightclub, Champagne Problems.

=== Exhibitions ===
Sanford has shown with formative New York galleries such as Leo Koenig Inc Kravets/Wehby Gallery, 31 Grand, and Gitler &____. His solo exhibitions at these venues include Mr. Hangover (2008), an exhibition at Leo Koenig Inc of poster-sized paintings tacked onto the wall, which mimic graphic posters that are commonly plastered across New York City, advertising products, mass media, and events.

Sanford has also shown in Europe at Gallery Poulsen (Copenhagen, Denmark), Galleri S.E (Bergen, Norway), Galleri Faurschou (Copenhagen, Denmark), and Mucciaccia Contemporary (Rome, Italy). His first European exhibition was held at Galleri Faurschou in 2005, and featured work from his TomPac project, as well as portraits of rap figures depicted as icons and Italian Renaissance-style paintings. Sanford's second solo show at Galleri Faurschou in 2007, called Bad Religion, addressed the topic of religious corruption through paintings of sinful and hypocritical acts done in the name of organized religion.

=== Notable works ===
Among his notable works of art are the TomPac project, Saints of the Lower East Side, Café des Artistes, Uptown Visions, and his ongoing series of New York Knicks themed artworks.

==== TomPac project ====
In 2003, as a tribute to Tupac Shakur on the seven year anniversary of his death, Sanford embodied the late rapper in a performative manner, which he called the TomPac Project. In order to become like the rapper, Sanford undertook a major physical transformation, which included losing thirty pounds, getting toned, drinking quarts of Hennessy, and tattooing one of the rapper's tattoos (“2Pac”) on his chest. To document the transformation, Sanford maintained a blog called thug4life.com that attracted more than 2,000 hits a day.

==== Saints of the Lower East Side ====
In 2012, Sanford was commissioned by FABnyc (Fourth Arts Block) to display a group of seven portraits on the facade of construction scaffolding in the Lower East Side. The portraits were stylized and utilized a gold-ground technique, in order to resemble medieval religious portraiture through a contemporary lens. The seven portraits in the series feature prominent figures who were associated with the Lower East Side creative scene during their lives: Martin Wong, Joey Ramone, Miguel Piñero, Ellen Stewart, Charlie Parker, Arthur Fellig, and Allen Ginsberg.

==== Café des Artistes ====
In 2013, Sanford's solo show Café des Artistes, at Kravets/Wehby Gallery in New York City paid homage to New York City's creative community. The title of Sanford's show was inspired by a former restaurant of the same name that was located in the lobby of Hotel des Artistes from 1917 until 2009.The subjects in Sanford's paintings are well-known writers, musicians, artists, filmmakers, and politicians. Each subject is situated in a specific and iconic New York City location. Sanford revisited the theme of celebrating artists in 2022, with a mural called Café des Artistes painted at the Blick Art Materials store in Union Square.

99 Bottles of Beer on the Wall

For his 2017 solo exhibition at Gitler &____ in Harlem, Sanford exhibited 99 still life paintings of beer bottles, sold individually or in a group of six, to represent how beer is typically packaged in packs of six. The project started through a series of social interactions via Sanford's Instagram account, where he often posts images his work alongside descriptive captions. Visitors to his studio would bring beer, and Sanford meticulously painted each bottle. Although the paintings depict mass-produced objects, they are personally complex, and reflect memories and experiences that impacted Sanford's life. For example, he notes that the Budweiser bottle recalls the time he drove a Budweiser delivery truck as a student at Columbia University. His painting of Ballentine Ale is the only artwork with more than one bottle of beer. It is inspired by Jasper Johns' Painted Bronze (1960); and conceptually represents Sanford's connection to his father, because Ballentine's is his favorite beer.

==== Captain Clutch, Ewing Athletics, and the New York Knicks paintings ====
Sanford has been a fan of the New York Knicks since the 1990s. In an interview with Spectrum News NY1, Sanford stated that, "I think of myself as the unofficial artist of the Knicks. You know, I really like being involved in the cultures I'm making art about."

Sanford has been painting portraits of past and present New York Knicks players since 2006. His Captain Clutch is a portrait of Knicks’ superstar, Jalen Brunson, which is rendered to look like the front of a cereal box. The Captain Clutch imagery, which was made in collaboration with Bocker Backpages, has been reproduced on T-shirts that have been popular with Knicks fans.

In 2023, Sanford collaborated with Ewing Athletics to release the 33 HI x Tom Sanford White/Multicolor sneaker and Patrick Ewing Dunk T-shirt.

Sanford's stylized, life-sized hand-painted wooden cutouts of current and former Knicks players were front and center during the team's 2026 championship run. Mayor Zohran Mamdani arranged for the cutouts to be installed in City Hall, which influenced local media platforms to call Sanford the "unofficial Knicks artist".

==== Uptown Visions ====
In the summer of 2026, Sanford created a 40-foot-long temporary installation of painted plywood cutouts that depict urban life in West Harlem and Washington Heights, which are installed on a wrought iron gate in Audubon Terrace, outside of the Hispanic Society Museum and Library. The artwork coincides with Art on Audubon Terrace, an annual event presented by the Hispanic Society Museum and Library and the Northern Manhattan Arts Alliance.

Uptown Visions was inspired by Joaquín Sorolla's Vision of Spain, and its public display coincides with the 100th anniversary of Visions of Spain’s permanent display at the Hispanic Society Museum and Library. Art critic Adam Zucker, writing about Sanford’s contribution to New York’s cultural lineage, noted that “It calls to mind an uptown rendition of Red Grooms and Mimi Gross’ electrifying installations that epitomized the downtown scene during the 1960s.”

Bo's Bagels

Sanford painted a large wooded tableau of a stylized and anthropomorphic bagel for Bo’s Bagels in Harlem, New York. The artwork, which features a life size bagel with cream cheese wearing sunglasses and a golden grill that reads “Harlem World.” The sunglasses reflect a vignette of the street view of West 116th Street and Frederick Douglass Boulevard, around where the bagel shop is located. These features were intended by Sanford to be celebratory of the street scene and innovative fashion aesthetics that Uptown New York City has contributed to the culture at large. However, while the mascot received mixed reviews, it became a topic of controversy due to some onlookers describing it as being stereotypical of African American culture. Bo’s Bagels and its employees received threats and harassment from social media influencers, and therefore decided to remove the painting from its location. Sanford was a guest on local news podcast, Uptown Voices, where he explained his perspective regarding the artwork and its impact.
