= Hitier =

Not to be confused with Hitler

Hitier is a French surname. Notable people with the surname include:

- Henri Hitier (1864–1958), French agronomist
- Jacques Hitier (1917–1999), French interior architect and designer

== See also ==
- Hitler (name)
