= Güttler =

Güttler or Guettler is a South German status name for the holder of a small farm. It derives from Middle High German güetelin ("small holding"), ultimately from guot "property". Notable people with the name include:

- Günter Güttler (born 1961), former German soccer player
- Károly Güttler (born 1968), former breaststroker from Hungary
- Ken Guettler (1927–1977), American baseball outfielder
- Ludwig Güttler (born 1943), German trumpet virtuoso and conductor
- Michael Güttler, German operatic conductor
- Ryan Guettler (born 1983), Australian cyclist
- Wolfgang Güttler (1893–1918), World War I flying ace

== See also ==
- Gitler
- Hitler (name)
- 30562 Güttler, minor planet
