= Gitler =

Gitler is a surname, and may refer to:

- Avi Gitler, Manhattan art dealer
- Haim Gitler (born 1962), Israeli curator and researcher
- Ira Gitler (1928–2019), American jazz historian and journalist
- Joseph Gitler, American-Israeli entrepreneur
- Samuel Gitler Hammer (1933–2014), Mexican mathematician

== See also ==
- Brown–Gitler spectrum
- Gittler guitar
- Hitler (name)
- Güttler
