= Stéphane Laurent =

French historian

Stéphane Laurent is a French historian born in Rueil-Malmaison, near Paris, France, in 1966. He is professor of art history at the Université Paris-1 Panthéon-Sorbonne since 1999, where he directs the specialty in Art and Industry (design, fashion and decorative arts). He also taught at the University of Paris IV-Sorbonne, at the University of Berkeley and in universities of the Middle East.

== Biography ==
Laurent graduated in design from the Ecole Boulle (1987) and studied art and design at the École normale supérieure de Cachan (1988-1993), where he earned a MFA in design (1990), got a Higher teaching certificate in art (Agrégation, 1991) and obtained a Master Phil. in History of Architecture (1992), before completing a PhD in Art History (University of Paris 1 Panthéon-Sorbonne, 1996) and being certified Research director (University of Paris 1 Panthéon-Sorbonne, 2006). He also passed successfully the curatorship competitive examination from the Institut national du patrimoine (France) in 2006 but finally declined the position. He accomplished his national service in Congo DRC, where he worked in a French cultural center (1989-1990).

His first publications dealt with the history of the design education in France: L'Art Utile (1998), L'Ecole Boulle (1998) and Les Arts appliqués en France (1999), Histoire de l'école nationale supérieure des arts décoratifs, 1766-1941 (2004, co-ed. with Thierry Chabanne). He extended his interest to the fields of design and decorative arts through survey books: Caractéristiques des styles (1998), Chronologie du design (1999), Le Musée des arts décoratifs (2006, co-ed. with Françoise de Boisgibault). Since 2005, his research is directed towards the cross-cultural studies: Figures de l'ornement (2005), Le Rayonnement de Gustave Courbet (2007), L'Unité de l'art, les peintres et le décoratif (Research Director dissertation, 2006), which inspired his book Le Geste et la pensée. He also published a biography on the French existentialist painter Bernard Buffet (Bernard Buffet, le peintre crucifié, 2000).

He contributes to various art magazines: La Gazette de l'hôtel Drouot, L'Estampille-l'Objet d'art, Connaissance des arts, La Revue du design, Creative-I. He is the author of the design entries for the Encyclopaedia Universalis and published many articles in symposia proceedings and exhibitions catalogs including Raoul Dufy at the Musée d'art moderne de la ville de Paris (Paris, 2008), Philippe Starck then L'Union des Artistes modernes at the Centre Georges Pompidou (Paris, 2003 and 2018), Art Déco at the Victoria and Albert Museum (London, 2003).

He was visiting professor in several universities and research centres around the world: CASVA/National Gallery of Art (Washington DC, USA, 2005), Japan Foundation/University of Tokyo (2007), Center for Chinese Studies/Republic of China (2008), University of Campinas (São Paulo state, Brazil, 2009). His international fellowships were a lynchpin to the development of his cross-cultural approach on the ornament, design, architecture and painting.

He is expert and Qualified Personality in art and design for the French Ministry of Culture and Communication, in particular board member of the Mobilier national acquisition committee.

== Contribution ==
Laurent pioneered the academic studies and teaching in Design history in France, where he was the first scholar to be appointed on a Design history position. His publications cover the history of design and decorative arts through complete surveys and critical academic works. Each of his studies aims to discuss original issues: Les Arts appliqués en France stresses a new interpretation on the history of decorative arts in France from the Revival to the Art Nouveau and to the Art Deco; in his biography on Bernard Buffet, he parses the destiny of a successful figurative painter (particularly in Japan) who faced the development of the contemporary art during the second half of the 20th century France. His book on Gustave Courbet emphasises the contribution of a charismatic realist painter to the development of modern art movements in countries like Finland, Russia, Germany or Brazil. In his studies on the vine-scroll, which extend the Questions of Style from Alois Riegl (1898), he shows the journey of this ornament along the Silk road and analyzes the mechanisms of the reception of forms in Japanese and Chinese cultural contexts, demonstrating the permanent foreign influences on Chinese culture since the Neolithic. He developed this analysis about contemporary African and indigenous design. In his works on the concept of Unity of art, he discussed the influence of the decorative arts on the modern art through the output of ceramics (Paul Gauguin, Pablo Picasso), paper (Pierre Bonnard's folding screens, impressionists' fan screens), textile (Aristide Maillol, Raoul Dufy), murals (Henri Matisse, Robert Delaunay, Fernand Léger) or stage and costume design (Fernand Léger, Pablo Picasso). In other articles, he voices concerns about the situation of a culture of design in France, the affirmative action of craftsmanship in Art, or an effective and long-run strategy for the French industry. His stance stirred debate.

== Bibliography ==
- Robert Ducher (new issue by Jean-François Boisset and Stéphane Laurent) Caractéristique des styles, Paris, Flammarion, 1998, 223p. ISBN 978-2-08-120788-2
- L'École Boulle, Woippy, Éditions Gérard Klopp, 292 p. ISBN 978-2-911992-07-0
- L'Art utile. Les écoles d'arts appliqués en France (1851-1940), Paris, L'Harmattan, 288 p.ISBN 978-2-7384-6750-8
- Chronologie du design, Paris, Flammarion, coll. "Tout l'Art", 240 p. ISBN 978-2-08-121918-2
- Les arts appliqués en France (1851-1940), genèse d'un enseignement, Paris, Editions du Comité des Travaux Scientifiques et Historiques, 1999, 684 p. ISBN 978-2-7355-0417-6
- Bernard Buffet, le peintre crucifié, Paris, Michalon, 2000, 392 p. ISBN 2-84186-139-2
- Histoire de l’École nationale supérieure des arts décoratifs (1766-1941) (Co-ed. with Thierry Chabanne), 228 p. ASIN B000WI6YOQ
- Figures de l’ornement, Paris, Massin, 2005, 205 p. ISBN 978-2-7072-0505-6
- Le Musée des Arts décoratifs, une étonnante grammaire des styles du Moyen Age à nos jours, Dijon, Editions Faton. coll. Dossier de l’art, n° 133, September 2006, 104 p. (Co-ed. with Françoise Boisgibault). ISSN 1161-3122
- Le Rayonnement de Gustave Courbet, un fondateur du réalisme en Europe et en Amérique, Paris, L’Harmattan, 2007, 234 p. ISBN 978-2-296-03783-0
- Le Geste et la pensée, Artistes contre artisans de l'Antiquité à nos jours, Paris, CNRS Éditions, 2019, 416 p. ISBN 978-2-271-11900-1
- Stéphane Laurent (ed.) Une Émergence du design, France 20e siècle, HICSA Editions/Université Paris 1 Panthéon-Sorbonne, 2019, 204 p. ISBN 978-2-491040-03-1 online publication https://hicsa.pantheonsorbonne.fr/collection-histoire-lart-contemporain#design
- R. Ducher, J.-F. Boisset, S. Laurent, La Caractéristique des Styles (风格的特征), Shanghai, SDX Joint Publishing Company (生活·读书·新知三联书店), 2020, 213 p. ISBN 978-7-108-06583-4
- Between Inventiveness and Refinement: An History of Design in France, London/Chicago, Reaktion Books (forthcoming).
