= Church of Saint Elgius of Paris =

Church in Paris, France

Coordinates: 48.8447°N 2.3887°E

Church of Saint Elgius
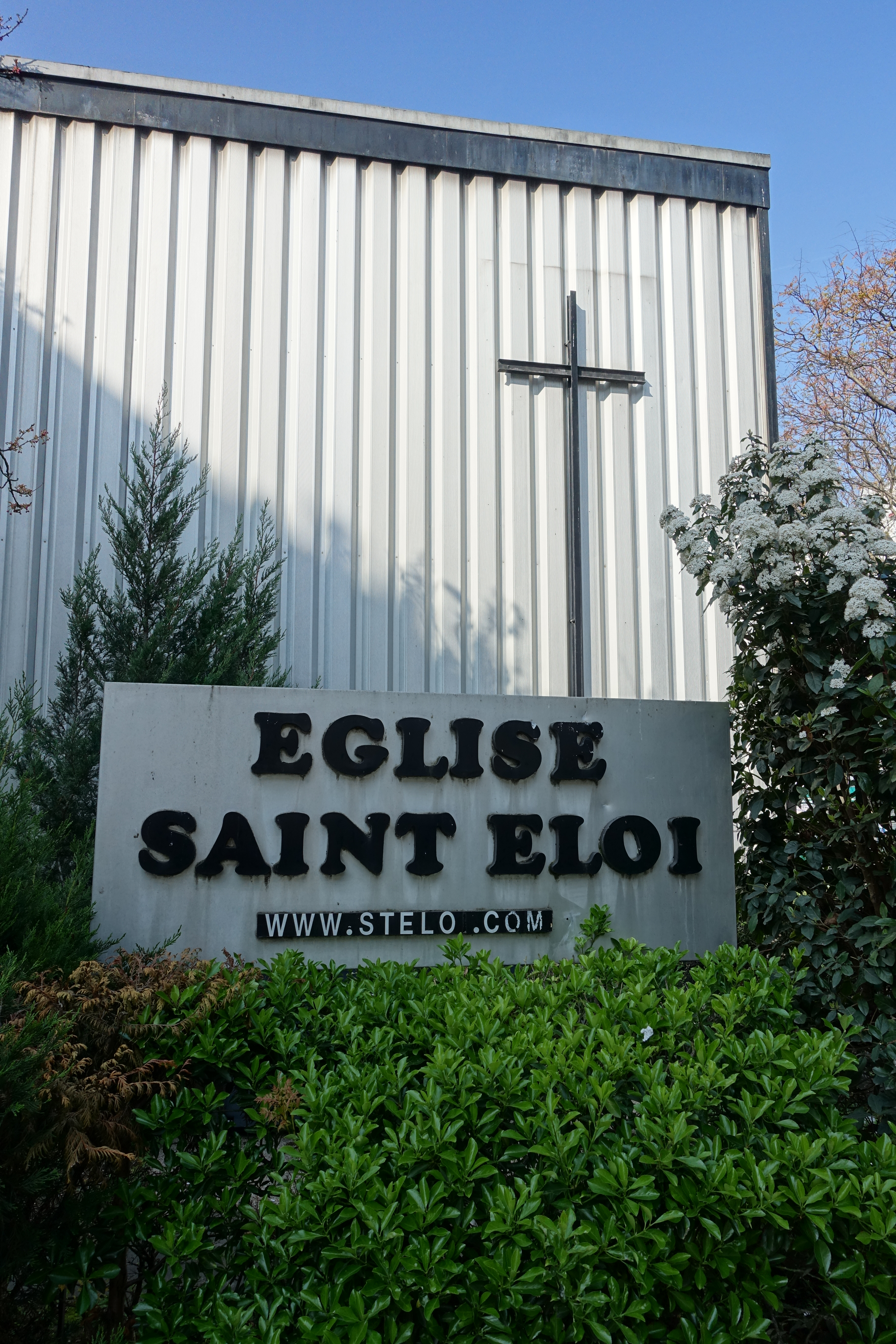

Religion
- Affiliation: Roman Catholic
- District: 12th arrondissement
- Region: Paris

Location
- Country: France
- Interactive map of Church of Saint Elgius

Architecture
- Architect: Marc Leboucher

The Church of Saint Elgius (French: Église Saint-Éloi) is a Catholic church located on place Maurice-de-Fontenay in the 12th arrondissement of Paris.

== History ==
The first church was located on the rue de Reuilly, in the 12th arrondissement de Paris, dating back to 1856. At that time, the neighborhood was known to be wealthy. Designed in the Roman style, this small, fragile building was destroyed in 1876 after sustaining damage during its use as a prison during the Paris Commune, probably due to lightning.

The intensive use of metal is reminiscent of the symbolism of Saint Eligius, a patron of goldsmiths and metallurgists.

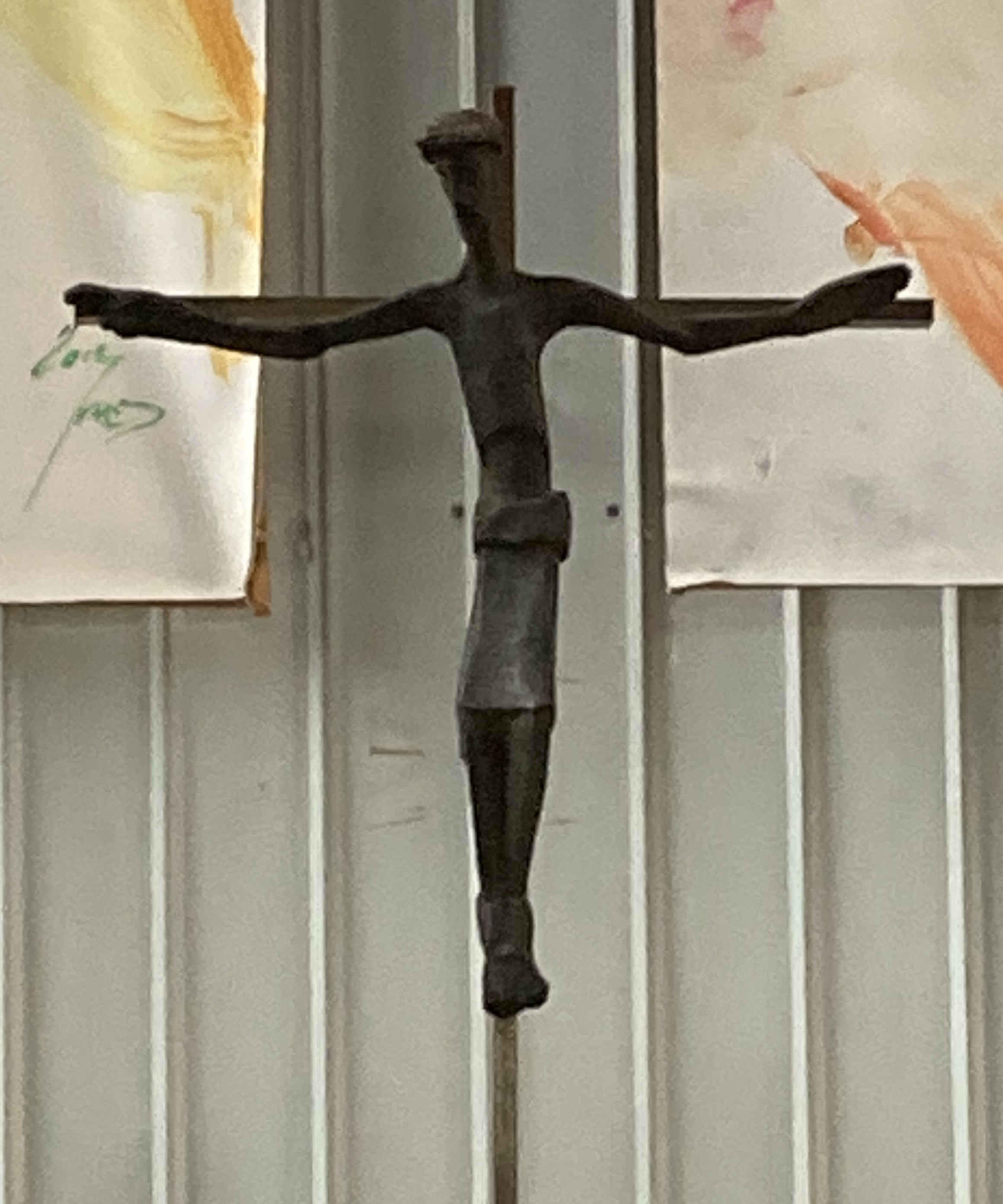
The crucifix in lead, made by the students of the École Boulle.

== See also ==
- Saint Eligius
- List of religious buildings in Paris
- Archdiocese of Paris
