= Audubon Mural Project =

Public art project

The Audubon Mural Project is a public art project with the goal of painting the birds depicted by John James Audubon in his early 19th century folio The Birds of America on blank walls and roll-down corrugated metal shop shutters of the Hamilton Heights and Washington Heights neighborhoods of Upper Manhattan where Audubon once lived. The project is the brainchild of Washington Heights art gallery owner Avi Gitler. Mark Jannot, vice president for content of the National Audubon Society and a Hamilton Heights resident, collaborates with Gitler. The two men were introduced by Tom Sanford, one of the artists whom Gitler engaged to start the project.

== History ==
The project began when Gitler invited a street artist to paint one of the roll-down shutters on his block; the artist chose to depict a flamingo, and Gitlin immediately decided to reference the neighborhood history by creating a series on Audubon's birds. At first, the project aimed to paint a portrait of each of the three dozen species of birds in the Audubon folio that is on the climate-threatened or the climate-endangered list of the National Audubon Society. It rapidly segued to a goal of recreating all 314 birds in Audubon's folio.

Audubon's home, a two-story frame house on an estate called Minniesland, was located near the Hudson River at what is now 156th Street. The neighborhood was a semi-rural outer suburb of the city when he lived there. The house was demolished in 1931.

== Murals ==
The paintings depict the same species that Audubon painted; they do not seek to reproduce his work. Each is the creation of an individual artist.

The murals are painted on main avenues and on side streets. Many are only visible late at night when the roll-down security gates are closed. Some cover enormous walls, other fill small, inset panels in windows and doorways.

Artists are paid modest stipends for creating the works.
