= Hitler (name) =

Hitler is a German surname. It is strongly associated with the Nazi dictator Adolf Hitler. After World War II, many people born with the surname legally changed it. Other spellings such as Hiedler and Hüttler were historically equivalent variants, with the spelling 'Hitler' being relatively new. Adolf Hitler's relatives used various spellings interchangeably.

Peru is the country with the most citizens named Hitler as a first name, with around 3,943 people according to the National Registry of Identification and Civil Status as of 2023.

== Relatives of Adolf Hitler ==
- Eva Braun (1912–1945), or Eva Hitler, wife of Adolf Hitler (marriage April 1945)
- Alois Hitler (1837–1903), father
- Alois Hitler Jr. (1889–1945), half-brother
- Angela Hitler (1883–1949), half-sister
- Bridget Dowling or Bridget Hitler (1891–1969), sister-in-law
- Klara Hitler (1860–1907), mother
- Paula Hitler (1896–1960), sister
- William Stuart-Houston, born William Patrick Hitler (1911–1987), nephew
- Heinz Hitler (1920–1942), nephew

== Other people ==
- Adolf Lu Hitler Marak, Indian politician for the Nationalist Congress Party
- Adolf Uunona, formerly Adolf Hitler Uunona, Namibian politician and councillor of Ompundja Constituency
- Hitler Nababan, Indonesian politician from the Democratic Party
- Hitler Saavedra (1978–2024), Peruvian congressman
- Chenjerai "Hitler" Hunzvi, Zimbabwean nationalist leader
- Bing Hitler, early stage name of Scottish comedian Craig Ferguson
- E. Hitler, early stage name of Swedish artist Eddie Meduza
- Elvis Hitler, stage name of musician Jim Leedy, lead singer of the band Elvis Hitler
- Heath Hitler, formerly Isidore Heath Campbell, a white supremacist known for naming his son Adolf Hitler Campbell
- Hitler Mussolini Simeón Flores, mayor of Queropalca District, Peru, since 2026

== Fictional characters ==
- Gay Hitler, a character on Saturday Night Live
- Edward Elizabeth Hitler, a character in the TV series Bottom
- Vic Hitler, a character in Season 3 of Hill Street Blues
- Bradley Hitler-Smith, a side character in the TV series BoJack Horseman
- Douglas Hitler, a minor character in Season 1 of Happy Endings
- Elle Hitler, a character on Family Guy
- Peter Hitler, a character on Family Guy

== See also ==
- Hitler family, relatives and ancestors of Adolf Hitler
- Schicklgruber
- Gitler (disambiguation)
