= Dave Dillewaard =

Australian BMX Dirt and Freestyle rider

- Born: 16 October 1983 (age 42); Redcliffe, Australia
- Occupation: Professional BMX athlete
- Height: 6 ft 5 in (1.96 m)

Dave Dillewaard (born 16 October 1983) is an Australian BMX Dirt and Freestyle rider. Dillewaard turned professional in 2002. Dave Dillewaard has been making a steady climb up the park and dirt ranks in the past few years, escalating to a first-place finish in park at the June 2006 CFB in Oklahoma City.

Dave Dillewaard has continued his BMX path and is now a professional BMX judge. He has also worked in major BMX, stores including LUXBMX. He now works for the Oldest and Biggest Australian BMX Wholesaler - BMX International.

== Sponsorsv ==
Dave Dillewaard sponsors have included GT Bikes, Famous Stars and Straps and Demolition Parts.

== Videos ==
Fox: Drama, Demolition: Last Chance, End Search, Ride Bmx: Flip Side, Ride Bmx: Range of Motion.

== BMX P.I.G ==
Dillewaard took part in season 3 of BMX P.I.G in Singapore with partner Ryan Guettler For the fourth round Guettler and Dillewaard gave Darden and Brian Hunt some trouble along with Diogo Canina and Corey Martinez, but Rob and Brian managed to make it one more day to the finals. The BMX PIG championship for 2007 went to Morgan Wade and Gary Young.

== Contest history ==
Date	Event	Location	Sport	Discipline	Finish
2006	AST Dew Tour	Denver, CO	BMX	Dirt	4
2006	Red Bull Elevation	Whistler, CAN	BMX	Dirt	12
2006	AST Dew Tour	Louisville, KY	BMX	Park	12
2006	CFB	Oklahoma City, OK	BMX	Dirt	8
2006	CFB	Oklahoma City, OK	BMX	Park	1
2005	LG World Tour	Manchester, England	BMX	Street	2
2005	Vans Let It Ride	Las Vegas, NV	BMX	Street	3
2005	AST Dew Tour	San Jose, CA	BMX	Park	7
2005	LG World Tour	Munich, GER	BMX	Street	1
2005	LG World Tour	Paris, France	BMX	STREET	1

== X-Games History ==
Year	Sport	Discipline	Finish
X Games 12	BST	Park	4
X Games 12	BST	Dirt	ALT
