= Leket Israel =

Israel-based charity

- לקט ישראל
- Predecessor: Table to Table, The National Food Bank
- Founded: 2003; 23 years ago
- Founder: Joseph Gitler
- Registration no.: 580407633
- Legal status: Charity
- Headquarters: 11 Hasadna Street, Ra'anana, Israel
- Coordinates: 32.194682°N 34.878923°E
- Services: Sources and collects food, which would otherwise be considered waste, from farms, hotels, military bases, and catering halls, and distributes to nonprofit organizations that provide nutritious food to Israelis.
- Revenue: NIS 131,156,000 (2015)
- Expenses: NIS 124,976,000 (2015)
- Website: www.leket.org/en/

Leket Israel, The National Food Bank, a registered nonprofit Israel-based charity, is the leading food rescue organization in Israel, serving 330,000+ needy people weekly. Leket Israel recovers surplus agricultural produce and collects excess cooked meals for redistribution to the needy throughout Israel via its network of 200+ nonprofit organization (NPO) partners.

== Goals and objectives ==
The concept of Leket or "gleanings" derives from the Torah (Leviticus 19:9 and Leviticus 23:22), which specifies that ears of grain that fall from the reaper's hand or the sickle while being gathered during the harvest must be left for the poor (along with other agricultural gifts to the poor, as specified in the Torah and elaborated upon in tractate Pe'ah of the Talmud).

"I think that at a very basic level, it's a very Jewish value to be appalled by food waste", says Joseph Gitler, founder and director of Leket Israel. Some farmers find it unprofitable to harvest all their produce while others cannot pick their entire crop before it begins to rot. In both cases, tens of thousands of tons of fresh fruits and vegetables are wasted each year. Israeli farmers invite Leket Israel to harvest their fields and to give the produce to needy people around the country. More than 40,000 volunteers took part in Project Leket in 2011. In addition, 20 Arab women were employed with full wages and benefits to assist in the picking. Through its activities, Leket Israel promotes the idea of peaceful co-existence. "We had an organization that had 25 employees, all Jewish, and suddenly, we have 20 Israeli-Arab employees, and it’s been a very positive experience," says Gitler.

Former Israeli Prime Minister Ariel Sharon allowed Leket Israel volunteers to pick oranges from his 15-dunam orchard in Ramot HaShavim near Kfar Saba. He was approached by the organization after one of its scouts spotted the unharvested fruit.

Researchers have found that more than one-third of Israeli children live below the poverty line. Many children attend school without eating a nourishing breakfast or bringing lunch from home. According to a report published by the charity in 2024, around 485,000 households in Israel experience food insecurity.

Leket Israel volunteers prepare and deliver more than 4,500 mid-morning meals to students at 70 schools around Israel. Each school day, the children receive a freshly baked roll filled with hummus, cream cheese, yellow cheese, or tuna, and a fresh fruit or vegetable. "This is the kind of program that builds and brings together all segments of the community", according to Shimon Pepper, executive director of the Rockland County, New York Jewish Federation.

== History ==
In 2003, the first National Insurance Institute Report was released revealing that 25% of the Israeli population was living in poverty and that most suffered from some level of food insecurity, meaning not knowing where one's next meal was coming from. Joseph Gitler, then a recent immigrant to Israel, started reaching out to nearby nonprofits and discovered that most of them were spending a large percentage of their budgets on purchasing food. Meanwhile, caterers were throwing out an exorbitant amount of food at the end of events. Mr. Gitler offered to pick up the surplus food from the catering halls and deliver it to the nonprofits thereby rescuing the food from destruction and at the same time, providing the food to those in need. This was the first step in creating what was then known as Table to Table.

In 2006, Hands on Tzedakah, a public charity based in Boca Raton, Florida, approached Leket Israel to create a program to provide school children with a minimum of one healthy meal per day.

In 2010, Table to Table (established in 2003) merged with the Leket Food Bank (established in 2007) and became Leket Israel. Today, serving as the country's National Food Bank and largest food rescue network, Leket Israel's primary mission is to lead the safe, effective, and efficient collection and distribution of surplus nutritious food in Israel that would have otherwise been destroyed, redistributing the food to a network of 200 partner NPOs serving over 175,000 needy Israelis each week. As an umbrella organization, Leket Israel also works to support its NPO partners through nutrition education, food safety, and capacity building assistance. NPOs include soup kitchens, community based organizations supplying food packages to the needy, centers for the elderly, shelters and after-school programs for youth at risk, among others. Leket Israel mobilizes 50,000 volunteers a year in its food rescue programs, and is playing a crucial role in raising public awareness to the issues of nutritional insecurity, food waste and the environment, and the importance of balanced nutrition.

Leket Israel coordinates the collection and redistribution of surplus food to nonprofit organisations across Israel. Its activities include working with hotels, caterers, farmers, and partner organisations to provide food to people experiencing food insecurity. The organisation also supports its partners through nutrition education, food safety training, and capacity-building initiatives.

In 2018, with the help of more than 47,000 volunteers, Leket Israel: (a) rescued, sourced, and distributed a total of 37,100,000 lbs. of agricultural produce, prepared meals, and other nutritious food to the needy; (b) cultivated, in partnership with farmers, 3,308,000 lbs. of field crops as part of a supplement to rescued food; (c) delivered 70 four-part nutrition workshops on healthy eating on a limited budget; (d) undertook hundreds of site visits to partner NPOs; and (e) invested $110,000 in capacity building funds to help NPOs upgrade basic infrastructure and improve food safety.

== Food Donation Act ==
In October 2018, after 10 years of intensive work, and for the first time in Israel, the Food Donation Act passed in the Knesset plenum. Led by MK Uri Maklev with support from MKs Eli Elalouf, Moshe Gafni, Yechiel 'Hilik' Bar, Orly Levi Abekasis, Shuli Mualem and Mordechai Yogev, in cooperation with Leket Israel. The Food Donation Act, similar to the United States Bill Emerson Act, absolves food donors, non-profit organizations and staff and volunteers at the non-profit organizations from criminal and civil liability, provided they adhere to food safety requirements set forth by the Ministry of Health. Israel is one of only seven countries in the world (US, Australia, Canada, New Zealand, Argentina and the UK) who have similar legislation, which encourages the collection of excess food and protects the donors and organizations that distribute it.

== Awards and recognition ==
Leket Israel has received or been recognized with the following prizes, awards, or titles:

- Midot Seal of Effectiveness (2011-2021)
- Greenhouse Energy Efficient Certified (2015)
- Bonei Zion Prize 2014 (Category of “Community” awarded to Leket Israel Founder)
- Official Israeli representative of the Global Foodbanking Network (Inducted 2011)
- Presidential Citation Recipient (Awarded 2011)

== Government partnerships ==
As an Israeli charity, Leket Israel does not receive any significant government funding. Of its 2019 estimated organization budget only 6.4% is expected to be funded by government sources and is allocated specifically to two new government subsidized initiatives. The first is a joint project between the Ministry of Agriculture and Leket Israel, with Leket Israel tasked to provide workshops on proper nutrition and agricultural surplus for the Bedouin community in the Negev. The second is a project of the National Food Security Initiative, operated in cooperation with Leket Israel and Eshel Jerusalem-Chabad, whereby reloadable cards worth NIS 500 are distributed to thousands of families suffering from severe food insecurity. Leket Israel is responsible for assembling and providing parcels of surplus rescued produce which are then purchased with a portion of the reloadable cards.

== See also ==
- List of food banks
