= Ana Zegarra =

Peruvian politician

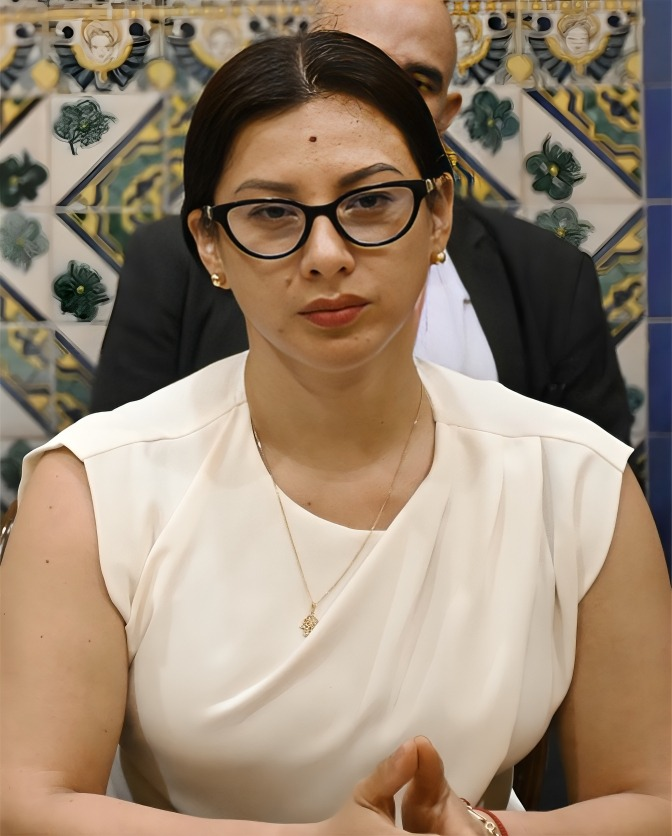

Member of Congress
- Incumbent
- Assumed office 2 October 2024
- Preceded by: Hitler Saavedra
- Constituency: Loreto

Personal details
- Born: Ana Zadith Zegarra Saboya; 11 March 1984 (age 42) Yurimaguas, Peru
- Party: We Are Peru
- Education: Private University of the North
- Occupation: Politician, administrator

Ana Zadith Zegarra Saboya (born 11 March 1984) is a Peruvian politician and administrator. She has been a member of the Congress of Peru since 2 October 2024 following the death of Congressman Hitler Saavedra. She is a member of the political party We Are Peru. She came in second place to represent Loreto in congress during the 2021 general election. She later became an advisor to Hitler Saavedra.

In February 2026, Zegarra proposed a resolution to terminate the seven censure motions against President José Jerí. However, Congress rejected the resolution and proceeded to successfully remove Jerí from office.
