= Schicklgruber =

Schicklgruber is a surname. Notable people with the surname include:

- Alois Schicklgruber, better known as Alois Hitler, Austrian civil servant and the father of Adolf Hitler
- Josef Schicklgruber (born 1967), Austrian footballer
- Maria Schicklgruber (1795–1847), the paternal grandmother of Adolf Hitler

== See also ==
- Hitler family
