= Jacques Hitier =

French Architect (1917-1999)

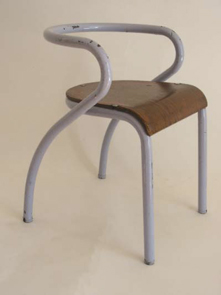
School chair, Mobilor, circa 1949

Jacques Hitier (28 March 1917 – 5 March 1999) was a French interior architect and designer. He was director of the École Boulle, a college of fine arts and crafts and applied arts in Paris, from 1972 to 1982.

After the Second War World, he specialized in designing industrial furniture for public environments such as schools and government buildings. He showed all his artwork at Salon des Artistes Décorateurs and at Salon des Arts Ménagers. Hitier also designed upscale and high-end home furniture.

Art historian Patrick Favardin called him "one of the most prominent figures of decorative art of the second half of the twentieth century".

== Early life and education ==
Hitier was born in Paris in 1917. When he was 13 years old, he was accepted into the École Boulle, from which he graduated in 1934.

== Early career ==
He continued to live in Paris, working for Primavera, the craft workshop of the Printemps department store.

In 1939, he was hired by Mobilor as a designer, to direct the company's design and production of school furniture. Mobilor produced the first models of Jacques Hitier, designs which used his hallmark tubular metal frame style. For Mobilor, he also designed an earlier model of the Mullca 300.

== First exhibitions after the Second World War ==
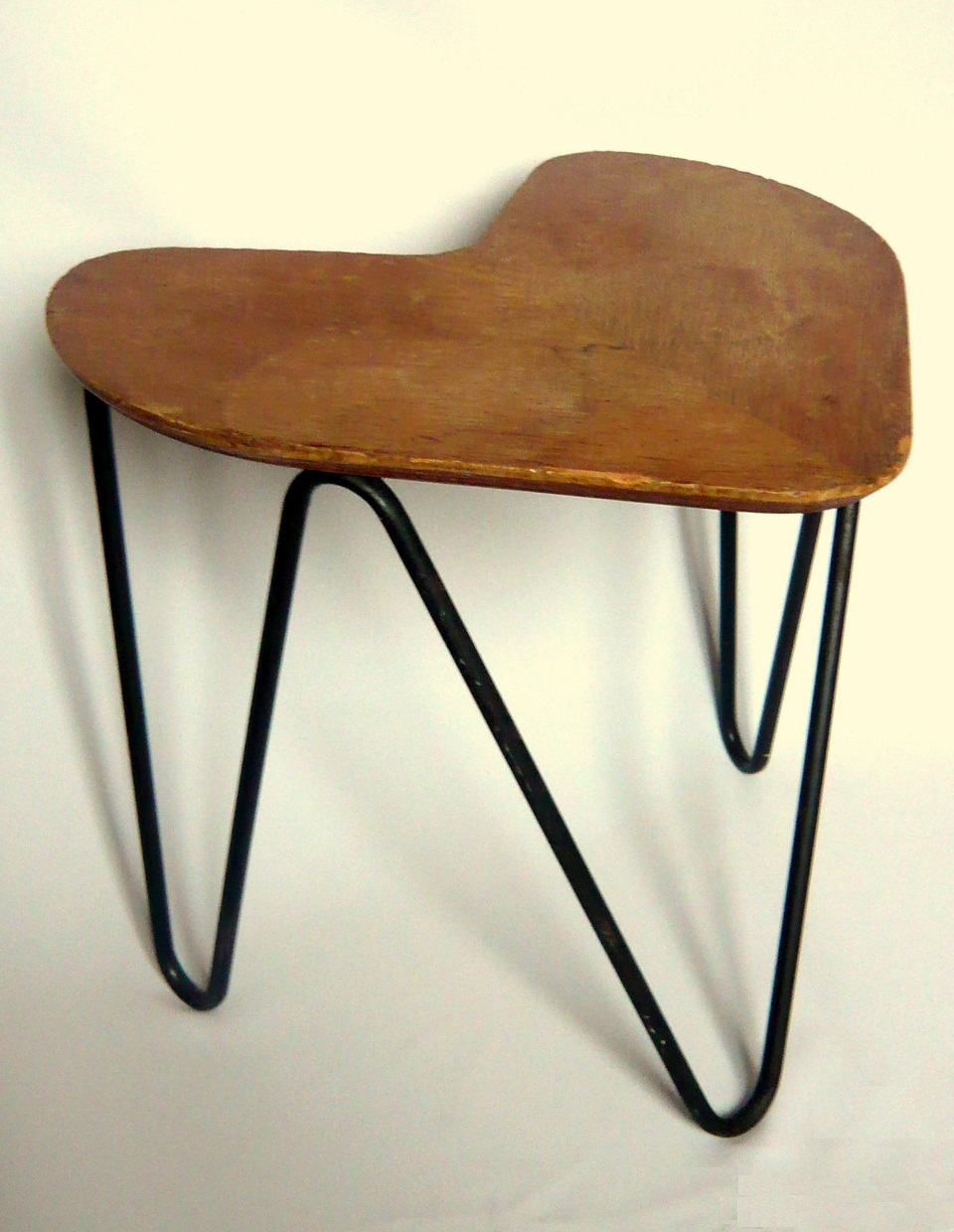
Coffee table, 1952

After the war and with two years experience of working as a designer for National Bank of commerce, he set up his own design agency. This coincided with his first involvement in some major design exhibitions such as the Salon des Artistes Décorateur in 1949 (directed by Jacques Adnet).

His stylish and practical school furniture became highly regarded within the design community and it was not long before the manufacturer Tubauto, decide to recruit him as a designer/advisor for creating tubular metal furniture for the home. Some of these designs were exhibited in the Salon des Arts Ménagers (supervised by Marcel Gascoin).

== Work with Tubauto ==
Whilst still working as a designer of furniture for public environments, he teamed up with the manufacturer Tubauto for 15 years. The collaboration spawned many new models of furniture. Most of the designs continued to use Hitier's signature of a tubular metal frame with soft materials such as wood, fabric and rattan.

He frequently took part in design contests and continued to exhibit his new models at the Salon des artistes décorateurs and at the Salon des arts ménagers until the 1970s.

In addition to his work with Tubauto, he also worked with other mass furniture producers such as MBO, La Méridienne, Multiplex, Durand, Glaces Marly and Crozatier.

== Teaching ==
Hitier taught aspiring designers at his alma mater, the École Boulle - he was a Specialized Teacher (1946–1964), Academic Dean (1964–1972), and Director (1972–1982).

== Interior architecture ==
Hitier also made an impact in the evolution of design as a trade. He believed that the trade of a designer had changed greatly since the end of the War, and so he undertook some changes in the major designer confederation, the Société des artistes décorateurs (which dated back to the Art Deco movement). In 1961, he refocused this confederation into interior architecture matters. He also created the union Créateurs d’Architecture d’Intérieur et de Modèles, which he headed from 1962 to 1969.
