= Vision of Spain =

Cycle of paintings by Joaquín Sorolla

- The Provinces of Spain
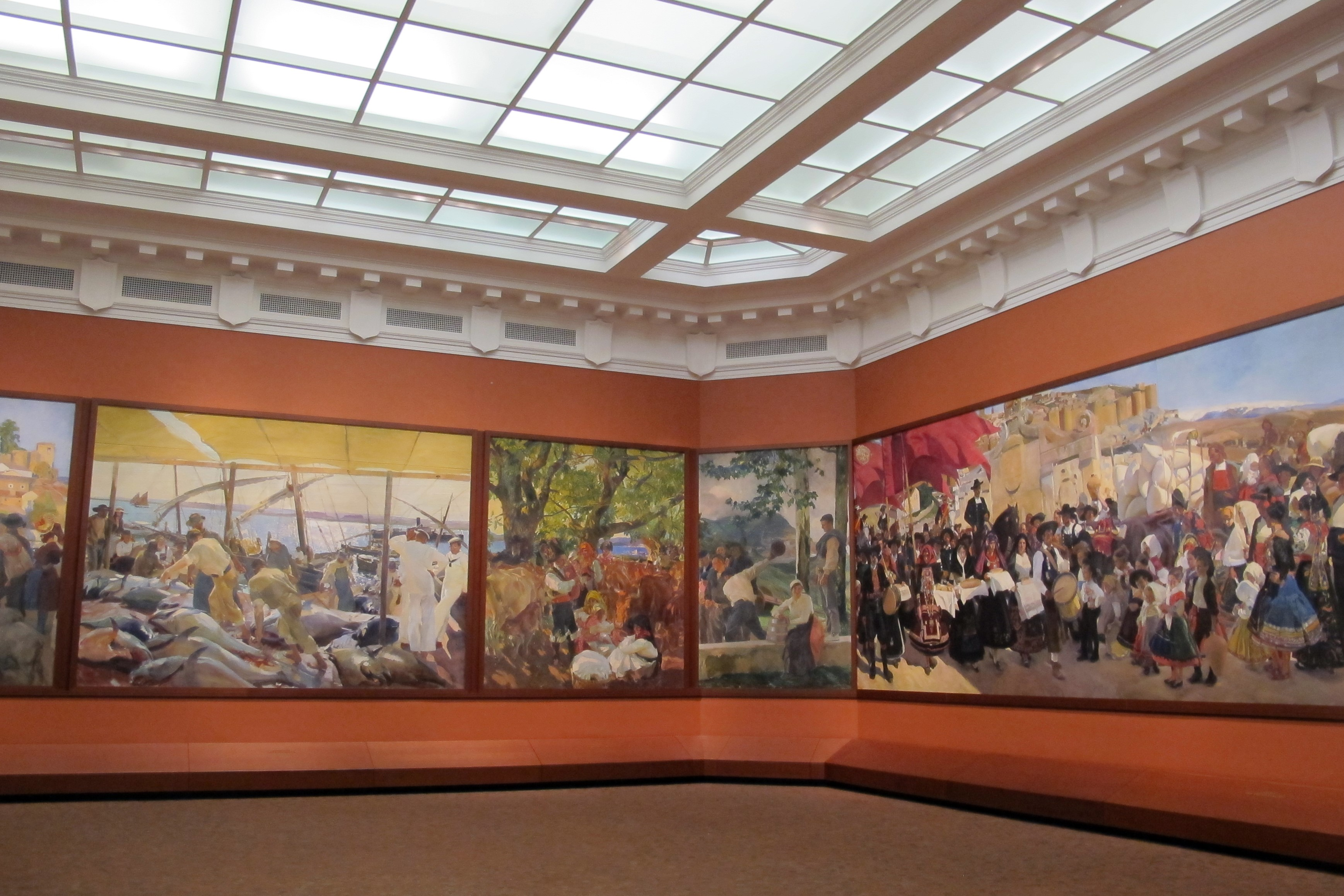
- Artist: Joaquín Sorolla
- Year: 1913–19
- Medium: Oil on canvas
- Location: Hispanic Society of America, New York

Vision of Spain, (Spanish: Visión de España) and also known as The Provinces of Spain, is a 1913–19 series of fourteen monumental canvases by Spanish painter Joaquín Sorolla depicting the customs, costumes, and traditions of regions of Spain. The series was commissioned by Archie Huntington for the Hispanic Society of America (HSA).

== Background ==
In 1911, Sorolla met Huntington in Paris and signed a contract to paint a series of oils on life in Spain. These fourteen magnificent murals range from 12 to 14 feet (3.7 to 4.3 m) in height, and total 227 feet (69 m) in length. The major commission of his career, it would dominate the later years of Sorolla's life.

Huntington had envisioned the work depicting a history of Spain, but the painter preferred the less specific Vision of Spain, eventually opting for a representation of the regions of the Iberian Peninsula, and calling it The Provinces of Spain. Despite the immensity of the canvases, Sorolla painted all but one en plein air, and travelled to the specific locales to paint them: Navarre, Aragon, Catalonia, Valencia, Elche, Seville, Andalusia, Extremadura, Galicia, Guipuzcoa, Castile, Leon, and Ayamonte, at each site painting models posed in local costume. Each mural celebrated the landscape and culture of its region, panoramas composed of throngs of laborers and locals. By 1917 he was, by his own admission, exhausted. He completed the final panel by July 1919.

The Sorolla Room, housing the Provinces of Spain at the Hispanic Society of America, opened to the public in 1926. The room closed for remodeling in 2008, and the murals toured museums in Spain for the first time. The Sorolla Room reopened in 2010, with the paintings again on permanent display.

== Critical reception ==
In 1957, Ruth Matilda Anderson, Curator of Costumes at the Hispanic Society of America (HSA), published her book Costumes: Painted by Sorolla in his Provinces of Spain. In great detail, she commented on the ethnographical background, referring to local dress and lifestyles, regional Spanish history and literature of Sorolla's paintings. Her book included 105 black-and-white illustrations, showing details of the canvases, as well as accompanying sketches by Sorolla in oil or watercolor from the collection of the HSA, paintings from private collections and oil studies in the Sorolla Museum in Madrid.

== Exhibitions ==
A few years before the original paintings could be shown in Spain, the Thyssen-Bornemisza Museum in Madrid and the Museum of Fine Arts in Valencia had presented the exhibition "Sorolla and the Hispanic Society" from late 1998 to early 1999. It showed sketches and preliminary studies by Sorolla for the paintings of the cycle as well as portraits of important Spaniards that Sorolla had created for the Hispanic Society.

From December 2011 to March 2012, the Queen Sofía Spanish Institute in New York hosted an exhibition entitled "Joaquín Sorolla & The Glory of Spanish Dress". Conceived by fashion designer Oscar de la Renta, chairman of the Institute's board of directors, it displayed numerous original pieces of clothing, jewelry, sketches and photographs from the archives of the Sorolla Museum, which the artist had used or collected during his work for the paintings.

From December 2013 to May 2014, the Sorolla Museum and museums in Alicante and Castellón showed an exhibition titled "Fiesta y color. La mirada etnográfica de Sorolla" (Festivity and Color. The ethnographical view of Sorolla). Among documentary photographs, studies and other of his paintings of people in Spanish traditional dress, it presented several costumes with accompanying jewelry collected by Sorolla, reproduced for example in the painting Castilla. La fiesta del pan.

== In other art forms ==
On June 12, 2013, the Spanish National Dance Company presented the world premiere of a choreography entitled Sorolla at the Matadero Cultural Center in Madrid, based on the costumes, customs and dances of the individual paintings of the Vision of Spain. This choreography, with 250 custom-made costumes, was also performed at the Teatre del Liceu in Barcelona in 2015 and again at the Teatro Real in Madrid in November 2017.

== Full series ==
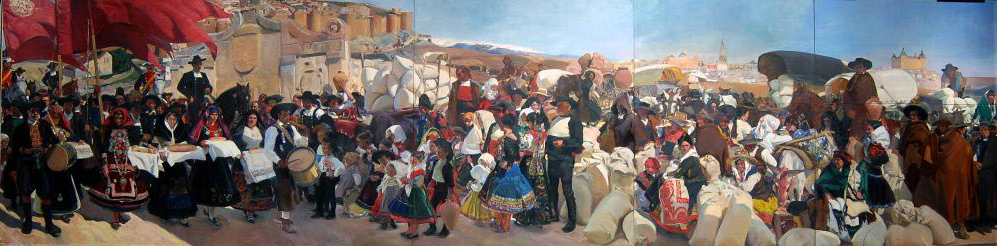
Castilla. La fiesta del pan (1913)

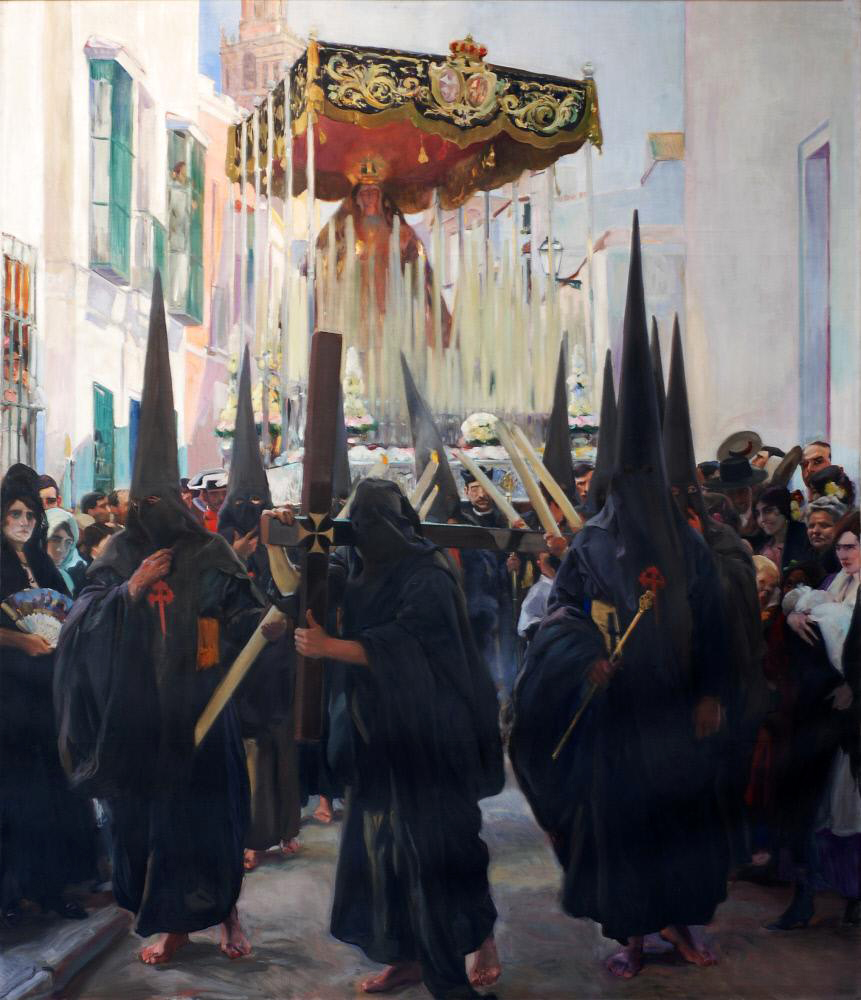
Sevilla. Holy Week Penitents (1914)

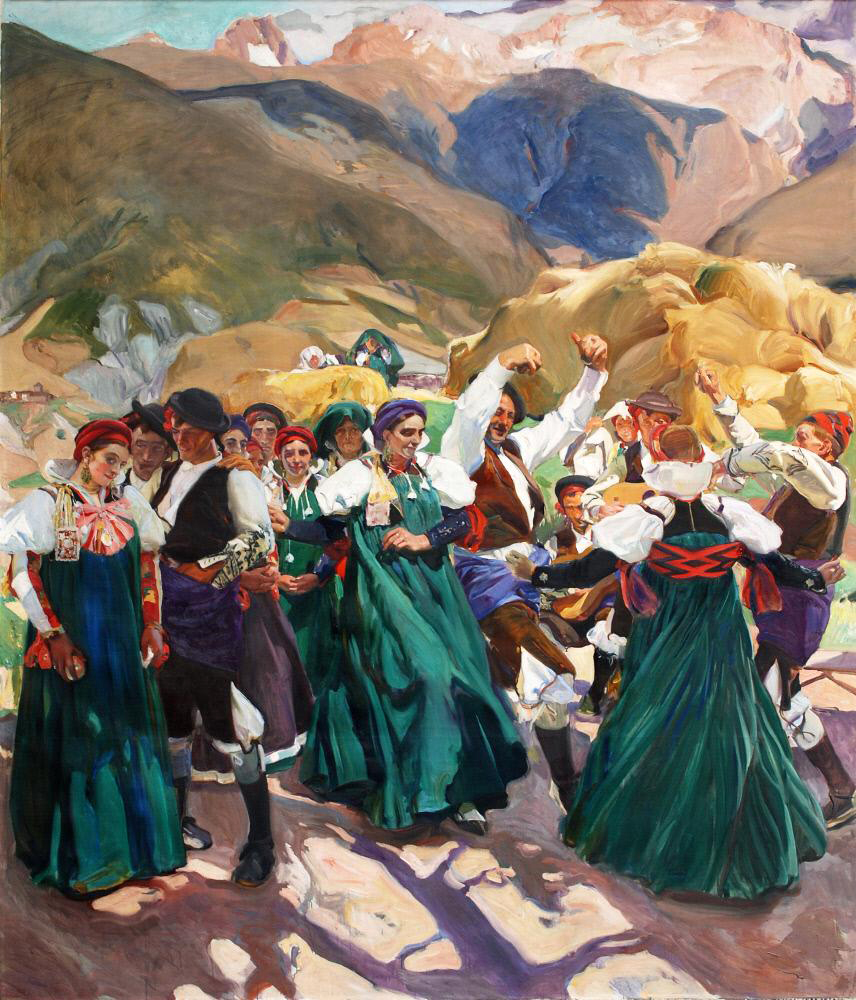
Aragón. La jota (1914)

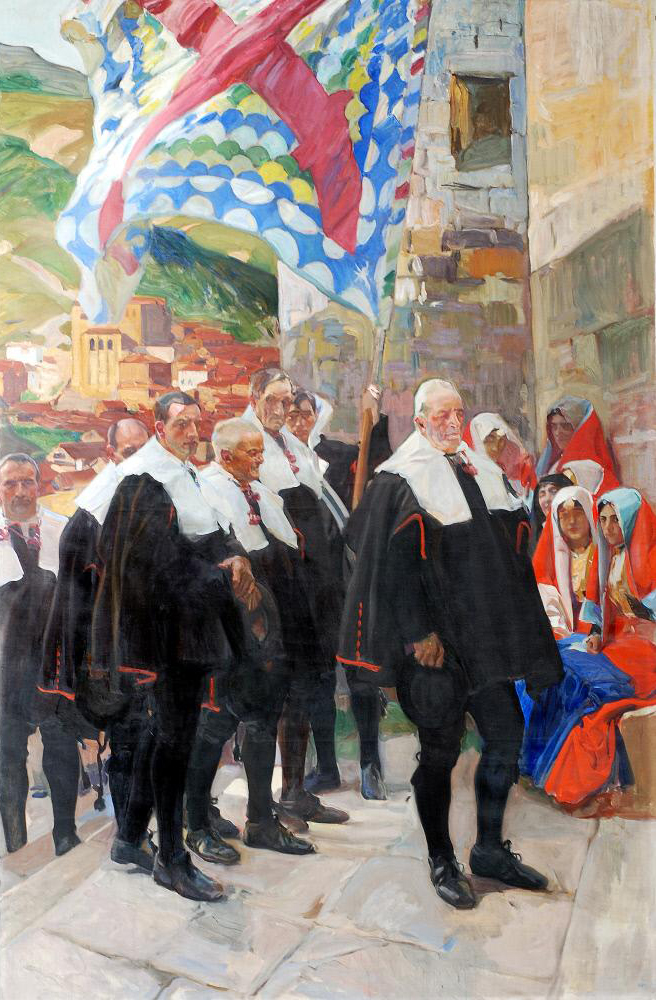
Navarra. El concejo del Roncal (1914)

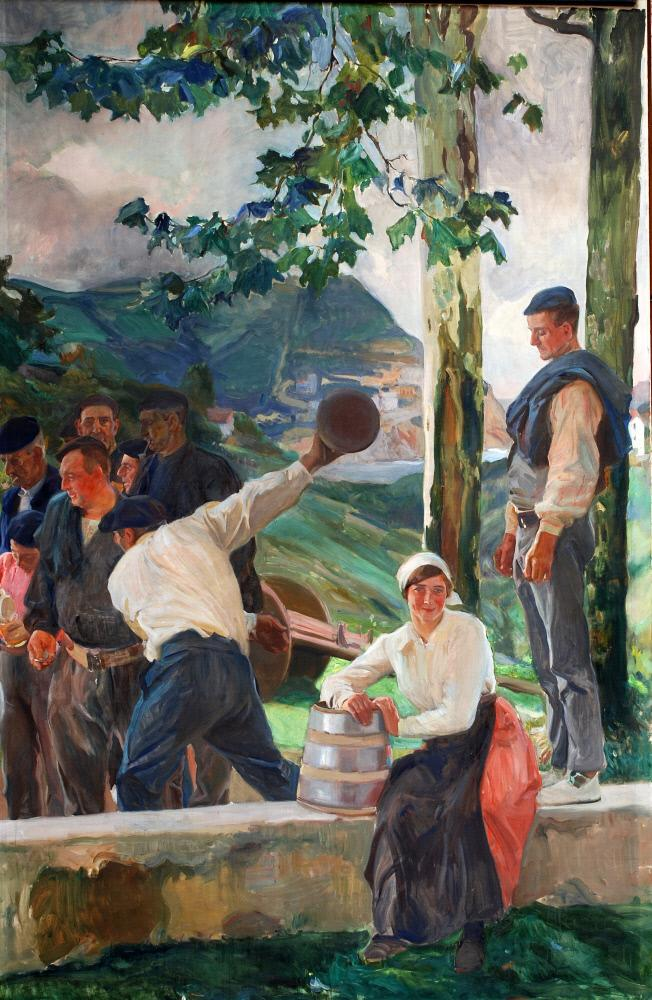
Guipúzcoa. Los bolos (1914)

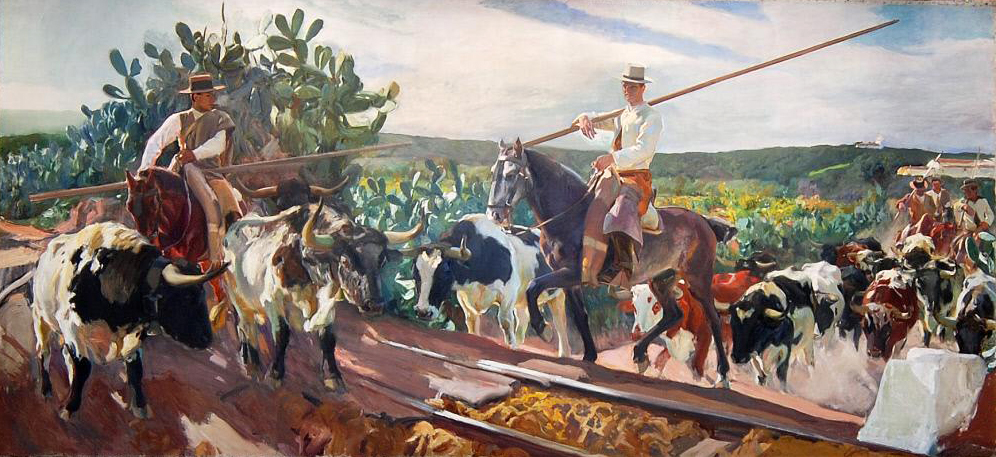
Andalucía. El encierro (1914)

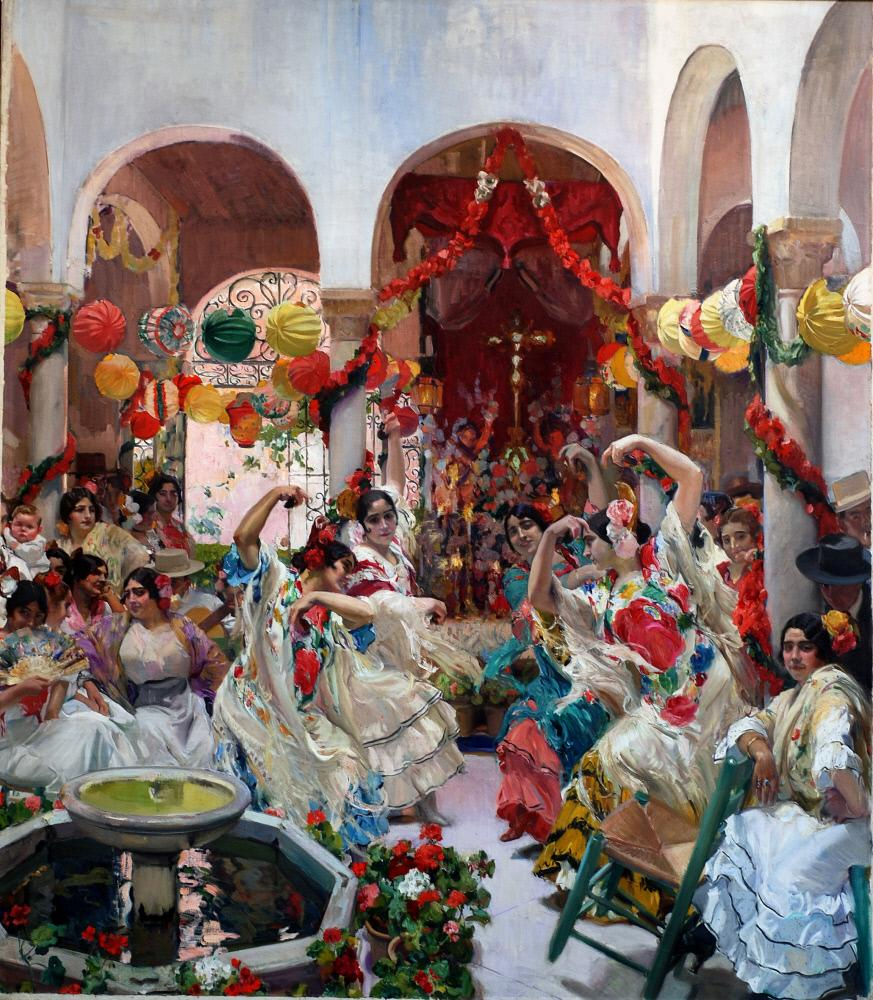
Sevilla. The Dance (1915)

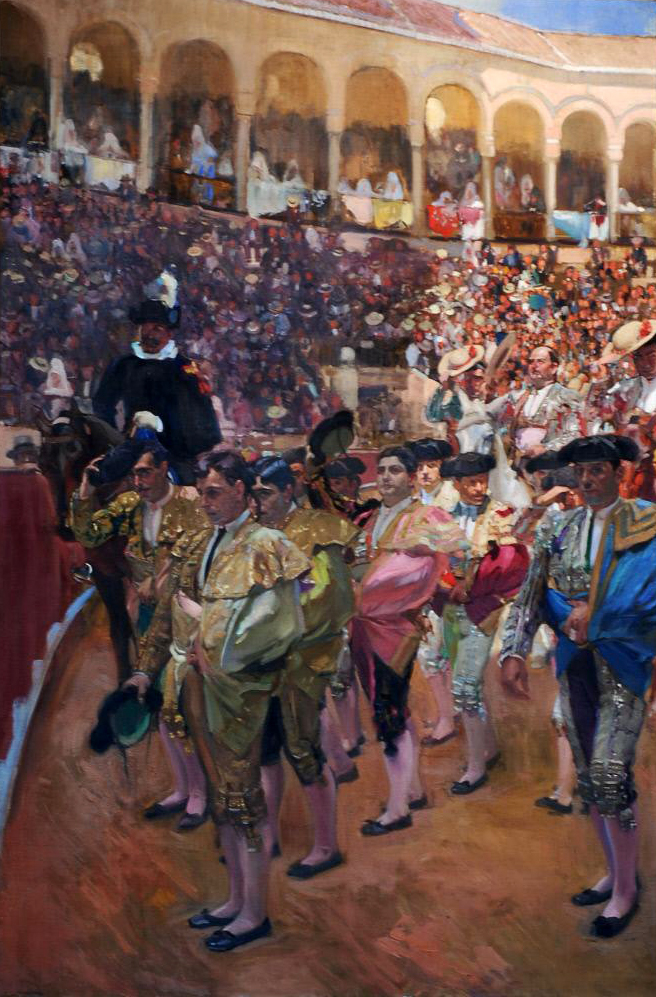
Sevilla. The Bullfighters (1915)

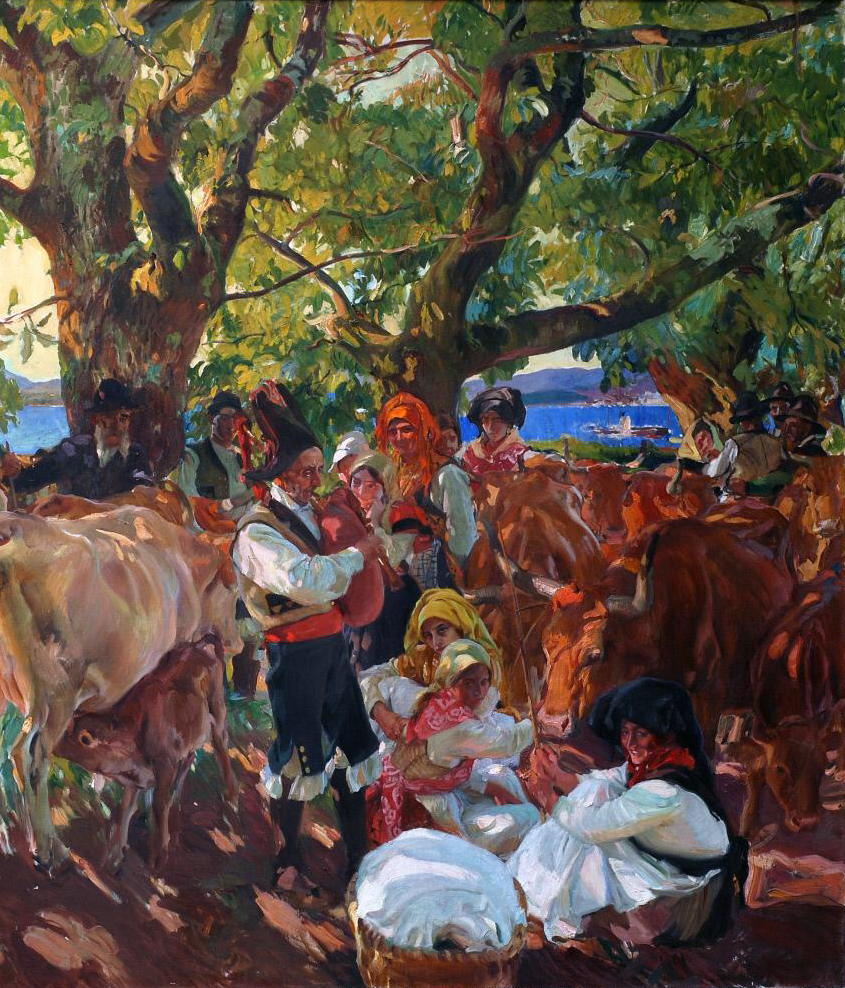
Galicia. La romería (1915)

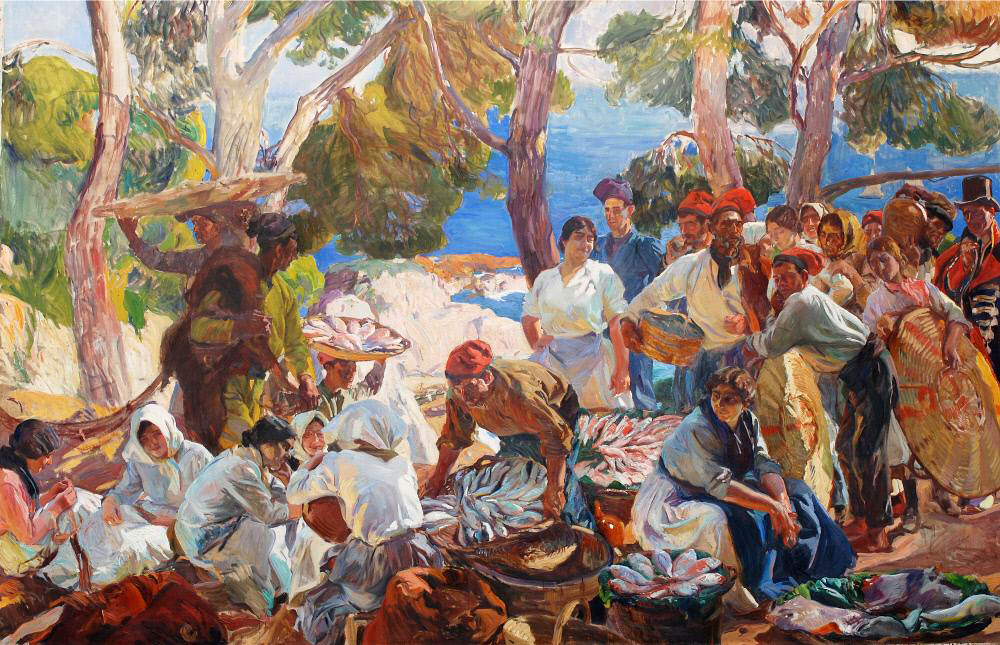
Cataluña. El pescado (1915)

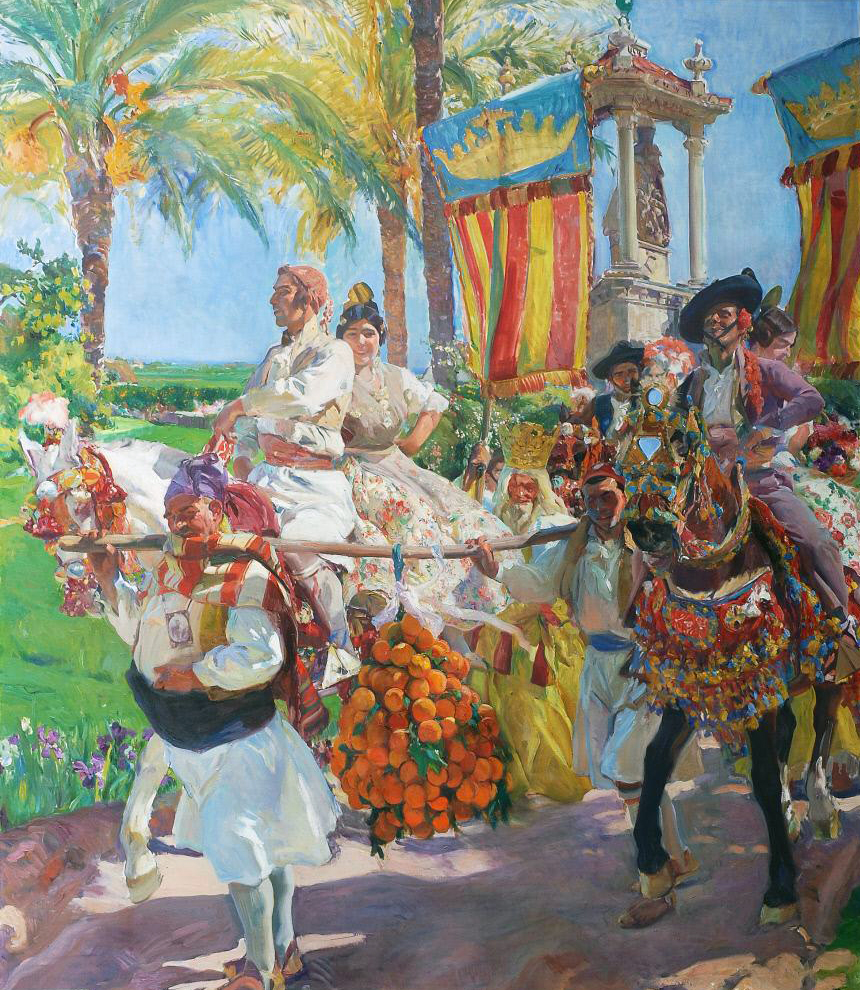
Valencia. Las grupas (1916)

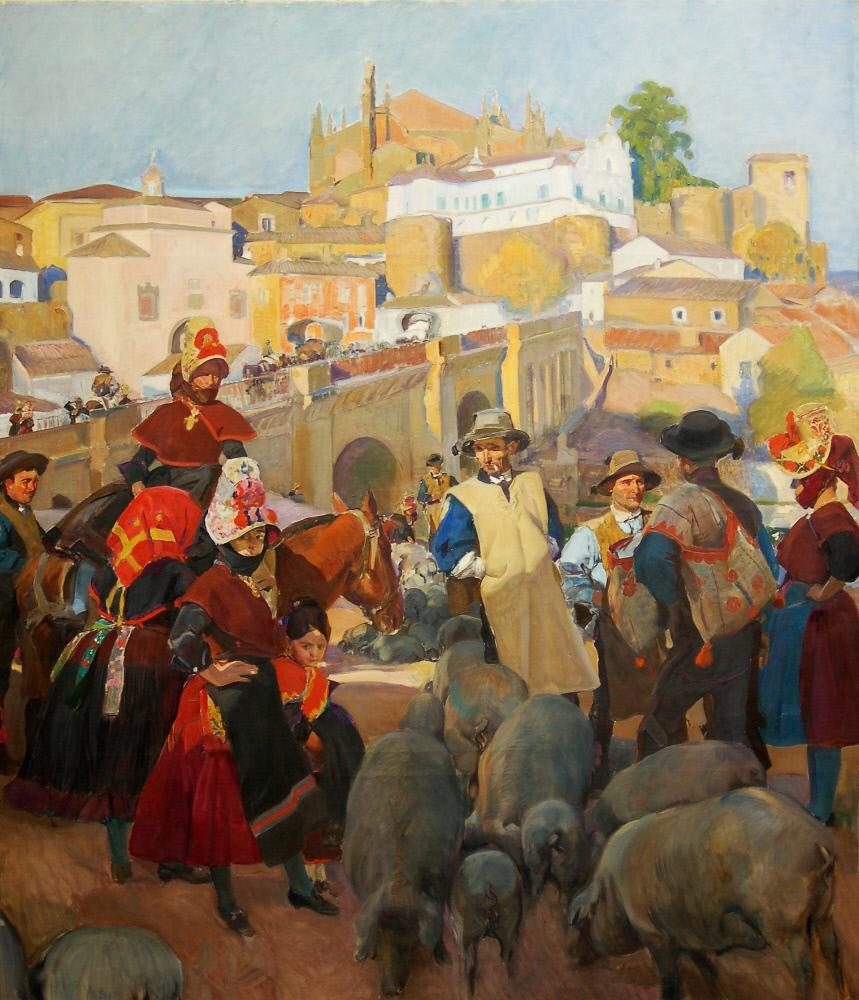
Extremadura. El mercado (1917)

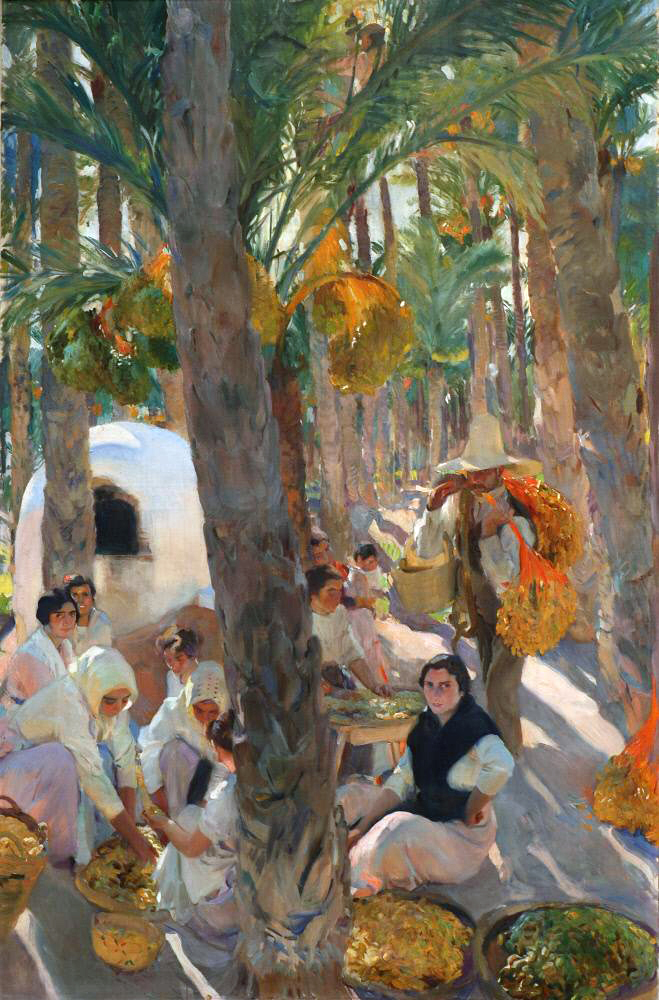
Elche. El palmeral (1918-1919)

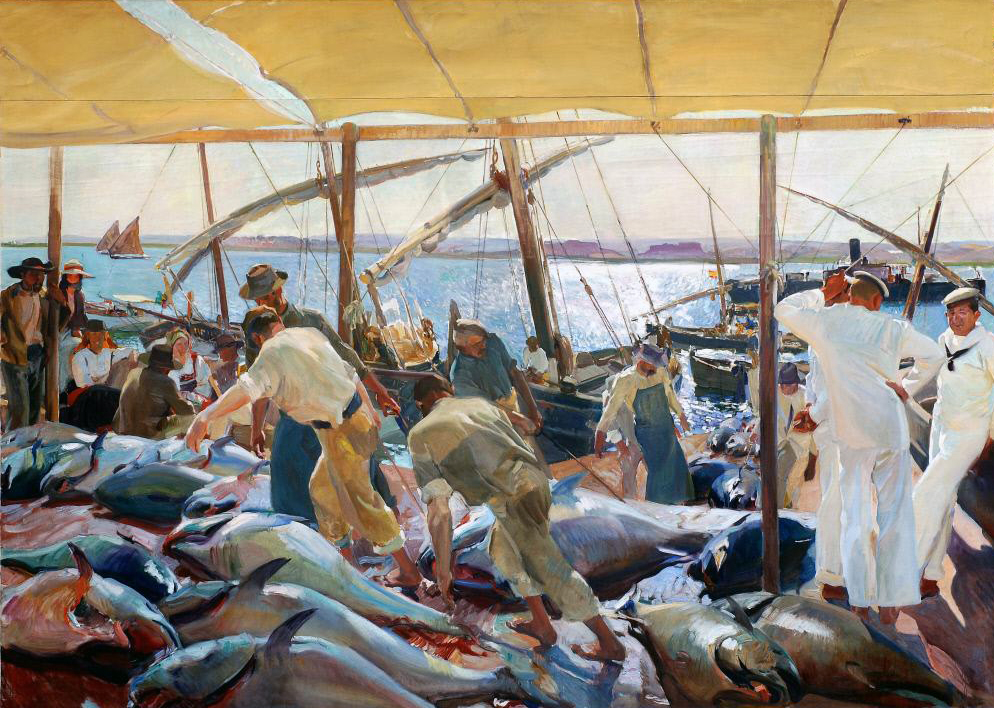
Ayamonte. La pesca del atún (1919)

== Literature ==
- Haddon, Madeleine (2021). Sorolla: Vision of Spain in the Hispanic Society of America. Madrid: Ediciones El Viso. ISBN 978-84-124439-4-3. OCLC 1302191518.
- Jennifer Park, Molly Sorkin, Joaquín Sorolla y Bastida, Queen Sofía Spanish Institute (2011). Joaquín Sorolla and the Glory of Spanish Dress: [Published on Occasion of the Exhibition "Joaquín Sorolla and the Glory of Spanish Dress" on view at Queen Sofía Spanish Institute New York, December 8, 2011 - March 10, 2012]. New York NY: Queen Sofía Spanish Institute, ISBN 9780615548180
- Isabel Justo, Tomás Ferré Facundo, Sofía Barrón Abad. La Visión de España de Joaquín Sorolla. In Miradas sobre España.(Teoría e historia de las artes). Barcelona: Anthropos, 2011, pp. 413–428.
- Marcus B. Burke: Visión de España. In José Luis Diez, Javier Barón (eds.): Joaquín Sorolla 1863–1923 (2009). Exhibition catalog Museo Nacional del Prado, Madrid, ISBN 978-84-8480-183-2, pp. 424–455.
