= Joseph Gitler =

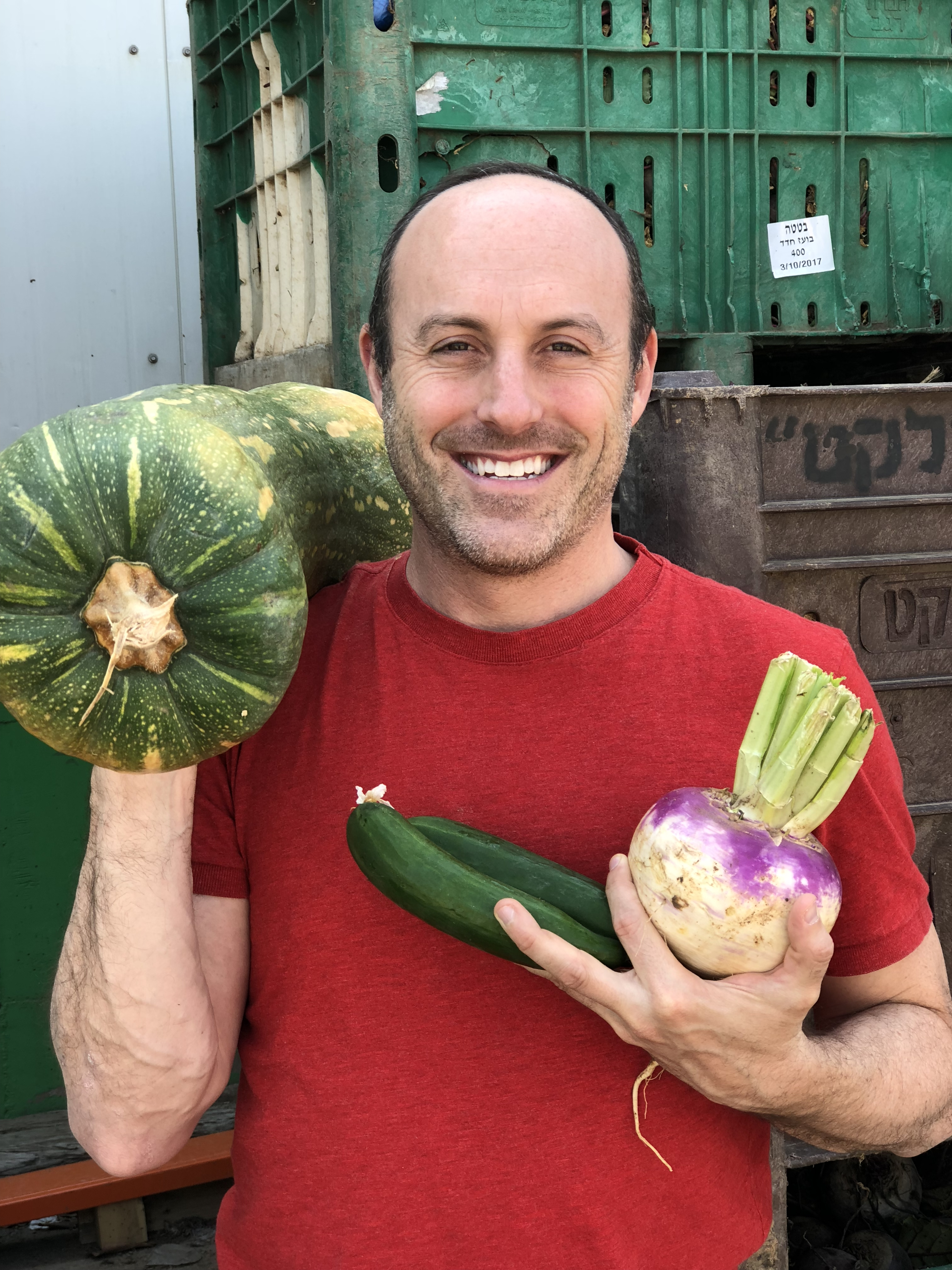
Joseph Gitler, Founder and Voluntary Chairman of Leket Israel

Joseph Gitler (Hebrew: יוסף גיטלר) is an American-Israeli social entrepreneur and the Founder and Voluntary Chairman of Leket Israel, one of the worlds leading food rescue charities. Gitler is widely recognized for his pioneering work in food rescue, addressing food insecurity, and shaping national policy to reduce food waste.

== Career and founding of Leket Israel ==
In 2003, after observing the simultaneous realities of food waste and hunger in Israel, Joseph Gitler established Leket Israel. The organization began with the collection of surplus food from caterers, and quickly expanded to rescue large quantities of surplus agricultural produce and cooked meals.

Today, Leket Israel rescues tens of thousands of tons of food annually from a wide range of sources including farms, hotels, caterers, and IDF army bases. The food is then redistributed to hundreds of nonprofit partners supporting people in need throughout the country.

Leket operates an advanced Logistics Center, a fleet of refrigerated trucks, and a dynamic volunteer network.

One of Leket's core initiatives is Harvest Helpers, which invites tens of thousands of volunteers each year to glean surplus vegetables.

Leket also established the Leket Briut - Nutrition Education program, which works in schools and empowers food-insecure populations with tools and knowledge to improve their dietary health.

== Legislative impact ==
Gitler was instrumental in the development and passage of the Food Donation Act in Israel, which provides liability protection to food donors and nonprofit distributors. Modeled after the Bill Emerson Good Samaritan Act in the US, the Act removes a major legal barrier to food donation and has helped transform the scale of food rescue in Israel. Leket Israel’s research and data were pivotal in advocating for the law's passage in 2018.

In 2024, an important amendment to the Act was passed, requiring government bodies to donate surplus food rather than discard it. This update marked a significant shift in public sector accountability and created a legal obligation for government institutions to participate in food rescue efforts, further expanding the scale and impact of food redistribution in Israel.

== Research and reporting ==
One of Gitler’s major contributions to Israel's food system is the annual Food Waste and Rescue Report, published by Leket Israel in partnership with BDO and in recent years, the Ministry of Health and Ministry of Environmental Protection. This comprehensive report quantifies the scope and cost of food waste in Israel and offers concrete solutions to improve national food security and reduce environmental impact.

== Board memberships and advisory roles ==
Beyond his work with Leket Israel, Gitler has played an active role in other impactful initiatives. His board and advisory involvement reflect his commitment to broader civil society engagement:

- Founding Member, Ten Gav
- Board Member, Re-Specs
- Board Member, The Meir Medical Center
- Board Member, Dualis
- Board Member, Mercaz Panim
- Board Member, Sheatufim
- Board Member, Kids Kicking Cancer
- Former Board member, Global Foodbanking Network, where Leket Israel serves as the official Israeli member
- Advisory roles in civil society coalitions addressing poverty and sustainability
- Mentor and consultant to emerging social ventures in Israel and abroad

== Awards and recognition ==
Gitler has received numerous honors for his leadership and social impact, including:

- The President's Volunteer Award (2018), one of Israel's highest honors for civic contribution
- Nefesh B'Nefesh Bonei Zion Prize (2014), for his outstanding work in community and nonprofit leadership
- Recognition from Forbes Israel and The Marker for his influence in the Israeli nonprofit sector
- Jpost 50 most influential

He is frequently invited to speak at global conferences and podcasts and has become a leading voice in food systems reform, sustainability, and nonprofit innovation.

== Personal life ==
Joseph Gitler grew up in New York and earned his undergraduate degree from Yeshiva University and his law degree from Fordham University. He immigrated to Israel in 2000. He lives with his wife, children and his Golden Doodle, Loki in Ra'anana, Israel.
