= Hitler Saavedra =

Peruvian politician (1978–2024)

Member of Congress
- In office 26 July 2021 – 17 September 2024
- Succeeded by: Ana Zegarra
- Constituency: Loreto

Personal details
- Born: Hitler Saavedra Casternoque; 18 February 1978 Yurimaguas, Peru
- Died: 17 September 2024 (aged 46) Cusco, Peru
- Party: We Are Peru
- Education: Universidad Nacional de la Amazonía Peruana
- Occupation: Surgeon

Hitler Saavedra Casternoque (18 February 1978 – 17 September 2024) was a Peruvian surgeon and politician. A member of We Are Peru, he served in the Congress of the Republic from 2021 to 2024.

Saavedra was found dead in Cusco on 17 September 2024, at the age of 46.
