= Ryan Guettler =

Australian bicycle motocross rider

- Born: 17 July 1983 (age 42); Beenleigh, Australia
- Occupation: Professional BMX Athlete
- Height: 5 ft 10 in (1.78 m)
- Website: www.ryanguettler.com

Ryan Guettler (born 17 July 1983) is a BMX Dirt and Freestyle rider from Beenleigh, Australia. Making his international debut at the 2001 Asian X Games alongside Colin MacKay and Jesse Boughton, Guettler won a silver medal, Colin won a bronze medal and Jesse took the gold. Guettler moved to U.S. appearing in the Global X Games, where he represented Australia.

Basing himself in Huntington Beach, he toured extensively, placing 1st in the Vans Triple Crown series in Dirt in 2004. He became a regular on the Dew Tour, an American five-city, BMX and extreme sports circuit, from 2004. Competing against rivals Dave Mirra and Ryan Nyquist, Guettler took the BMX Dirt events, and the Park events, to become the tour's first two-discipline winner. He went on to compete in later Dew Tour events, such as Salt Lake Cithy where he performed a 1080, double backflip, front flip, flairs and a double whip for second place. However, due to injuries including a grade III shoulder separation, he has not been able to carry over his earlier tour wins.

Guettler appeared in part in Season 3 of BMX P.I.G filmed in Singapore, where his team partner was Dave Dillewaard. His sponsors have included Colony BMX and Hyper Bicycles. Guettler released a signature bike from MirraCo called The Black Pearl, and designed a pair of Vans shoes.

== Contest history ==
2004
2004: X Games X, 3rd BMX Park
2005
2005: X Games XI, 3rd BMX Dirt
1st BMX Park, 2005 AST Dew Tour

1st BMX Park, Event 1, Panasonic Open, AST Dew Tour.
1st BMX Park, Right Guard Open, AST Dew Tour
3rd BMX Park, Vans Invitational, AST Dew Tour
5th BMX Park, Toyota Challenge, AST Dew Tour
3rd BMX Park, PlayStation Pro, AST Dew Tour

1st BMX Dirt, 2005 AST Dew Tour

10th BMX Dirt, Panasonic Open, AST Dew Tour
1st BMX Dirt, Right Guard Open, AST Dew Tour
1st BMX Dirt, Vans Invitational, AST Dew Tour
1st BMX Dirt, Toyota Challenge, AST Dew Tour
2nd BMX Dirt, PlayStation Pro, AST Dew Tour

2006
2nd BMX Park, Panasonic Open, AST Dew Tour
6th BMX Dirt, Right Guard Open, AST Dew Tour
1st BMX Dirt, Toyota Challenge, AST Dew Tour
2007
1st Dirt, BMX Games
2nd Park, BMX Games
1st Mini, BMX Games
2nd BMX Park, AST Dew Tour's Toyota Challenge
