= École Boulle =

School of arts and crafts in Paris, France

Coordinates: 48.8465°N 2.3910°E

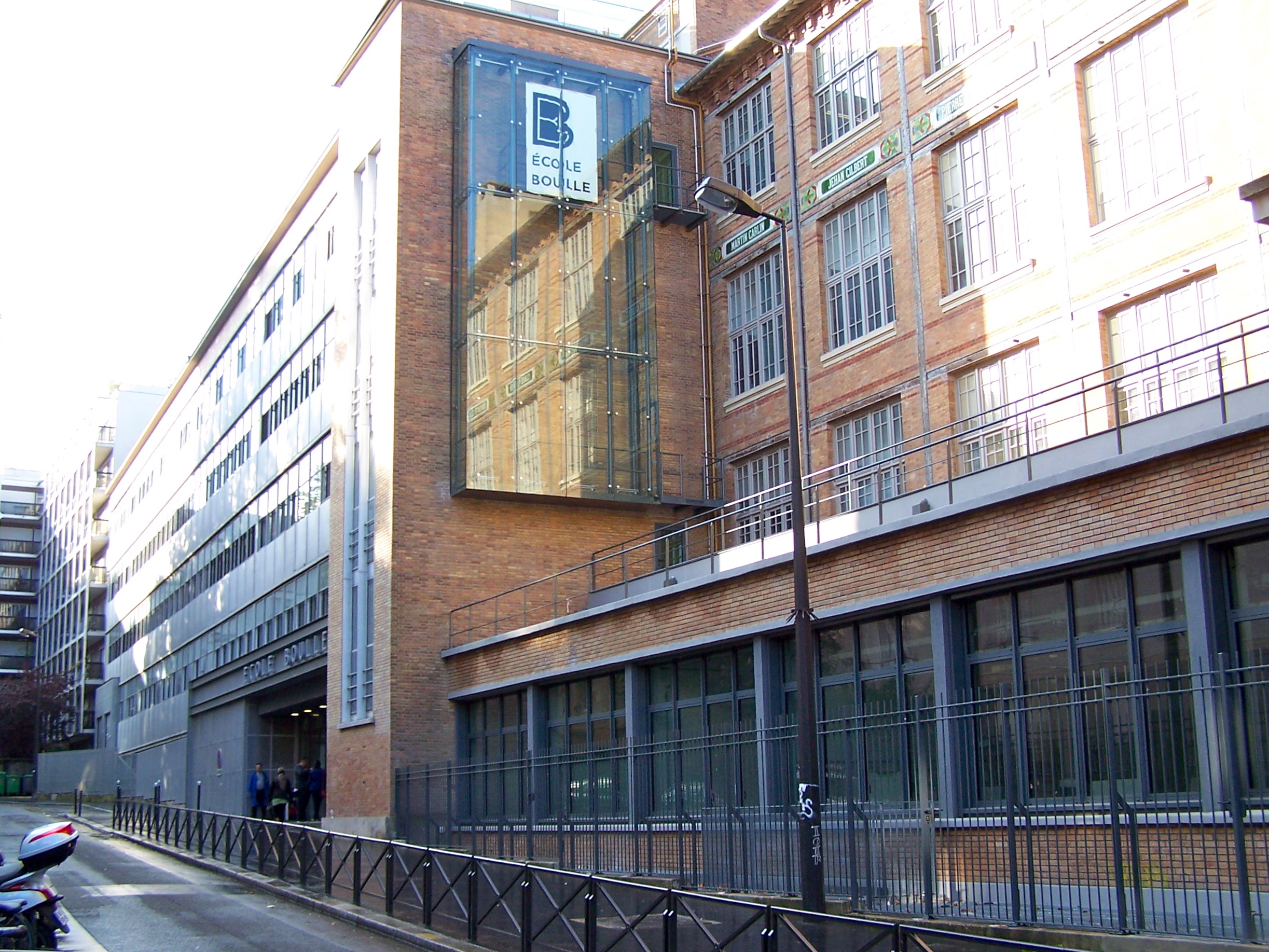
Entry facade of the École Boulle

The École Boulle (French pronunciation: [ekɔl bul]) is a college of fine arts and crafts and applied arts in Paris, France. It is located at 9-21, rue Pierre-Bourdan in the 12th arrondissement of Paris (France). It accepts students at both the secondary-school and tertiary levels.

== Curriculum ==
The school trains students at various levels, starting at the Applied Arts Baccalauréat (French national secondary-school diploma required to pursue university studies for 18-year-old students) to the DSAA (4-year degree in applied arts after the Baccalauréat, equivalent to a master's degree). It offers three different DSAA (Diplôme Supérieur d'Arts Appliqués), relating to three different departments: Spatial Design, Communication Design and Product Design.

The curriculum covers two main fields:

- Artistic crafts including chair making, marquetry, cabinet making, tapestry, engraving, sculpture in wood, wood turning, bronze sculpture and jewellery;
- Applied arts including spatial design and interior architecture, industrial design, furniture design, visual expression and communication, with additional education in computer software, applied philosophy, semiotics and history of art.

== History ==
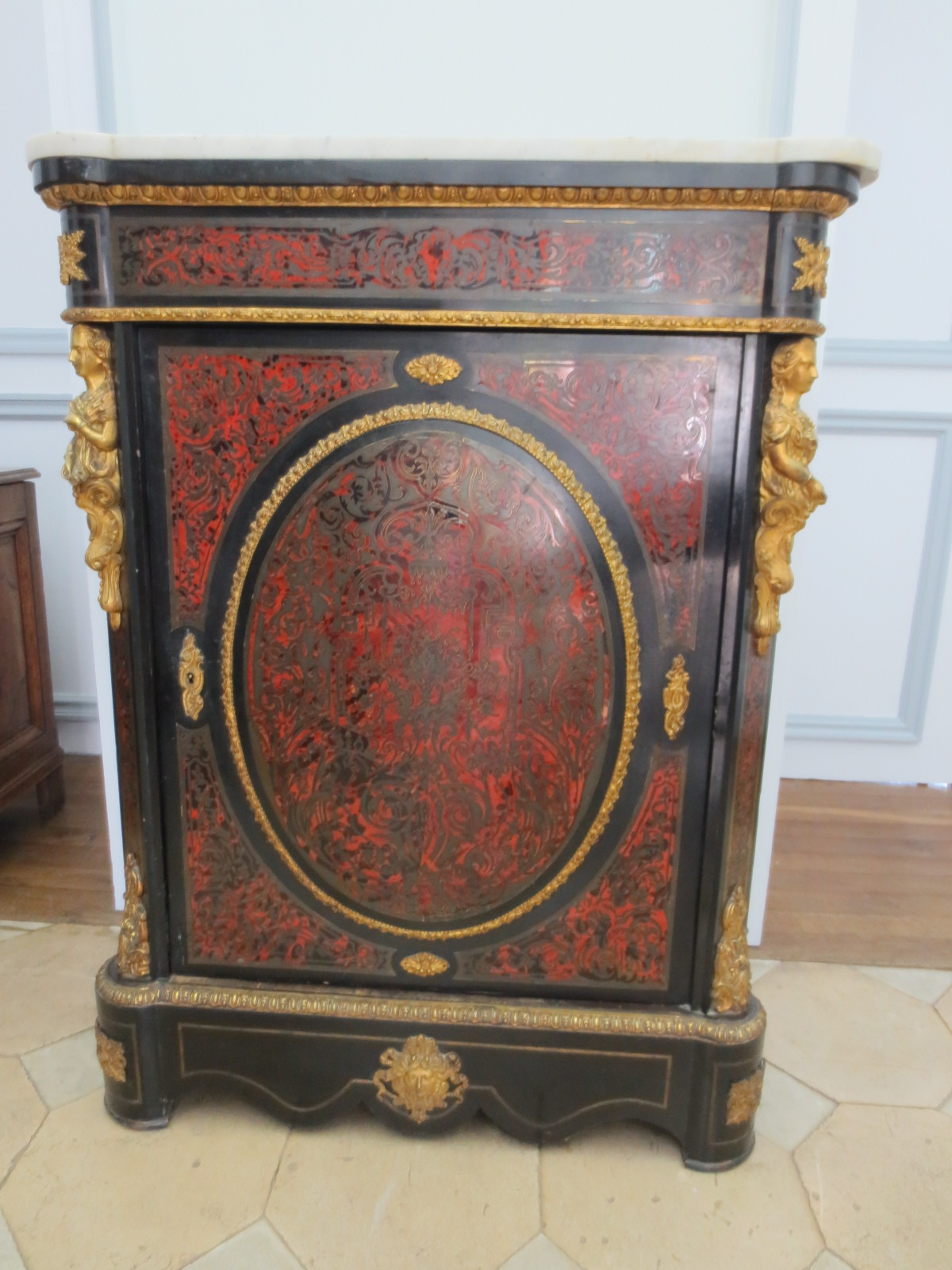
Buffet in the style of Napoleon III, produced at the École Boulle

The École Boulle was founded in 1886 and is named after the cabinetmaker André-Charles Boulle, who is generally considered to be the preeminent artist in the field of marquetry or inlay during the reign of Louis XIV (1643-1715), the Sun King. André-Charles Boulle's art is today known as "Boulle work".

The school was originally located on the rue de Reuilly in the heart of the historic district of the furniture trades, near the Faubourg Saint-Antoine in Paris. Created on the initiative of the city of Paris, it was then a municipal school. Its primary purpose was to train furniture professionals such as cabinetmakers, carpenters, upholsterers and wood carvers. Later, training was added in complementary trades such as carvers, bronze fitters, or steel engravers.

The first mentions of the name "École Boulle" appear from 1887 in municipal bulletins. In 1891, the establishment which had then been relocated to the nearby rue Pierre-Bourdan, in the 12th arrondissement, officially became the École Boulle. At the time, it specialized in copying of works from the past, essentially linked to Louis XIV.

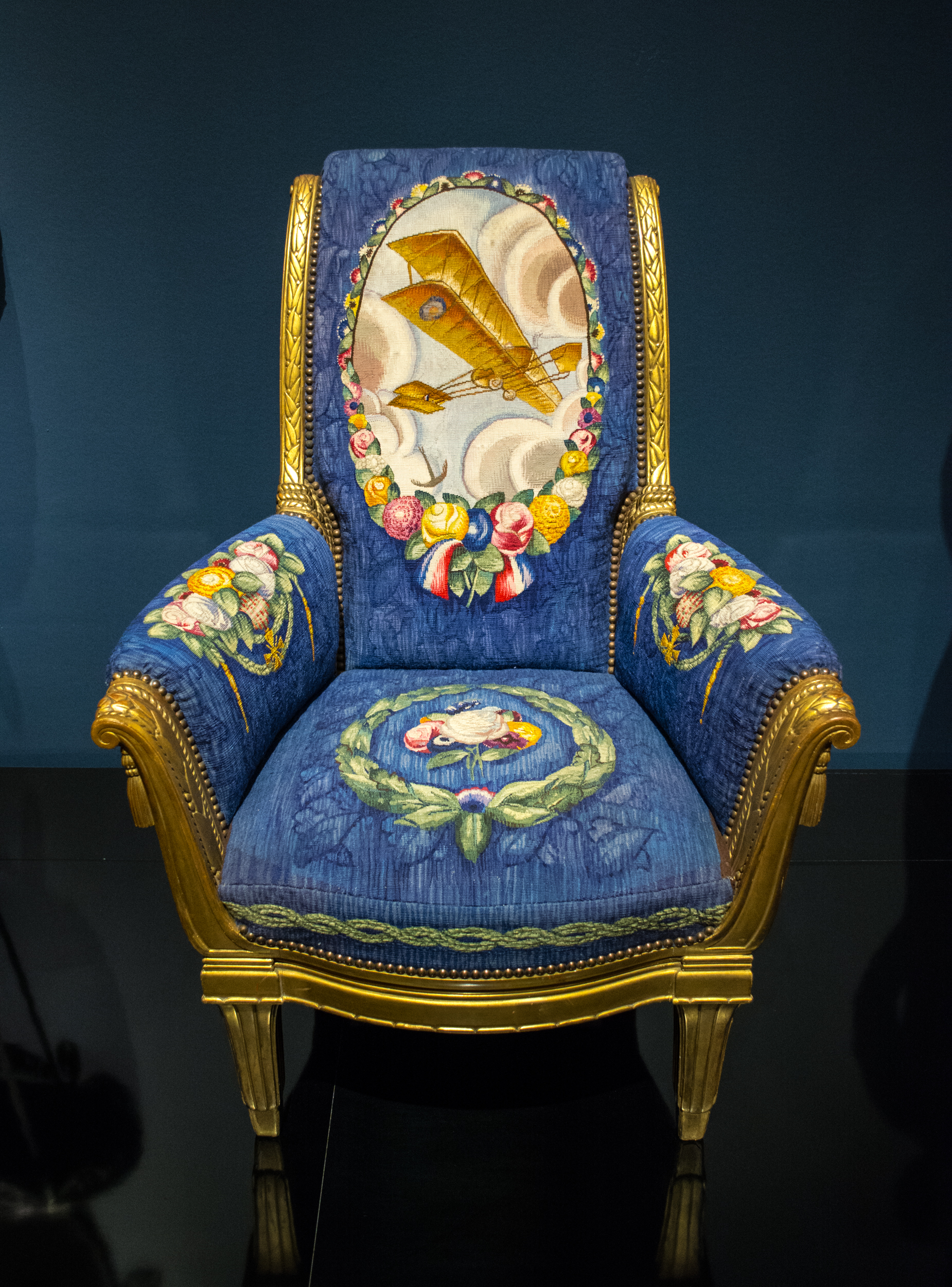
Arm chair celebrating the victory of Allied forces in World War I. The gilded frame of the chair was produced at the École Boulle.

In 1900, École Boulle presented objects influenced by the Art Nouveau movement at the Universal Exhibition in the pavilion of the city of Paris. Jehan Raymond, a famous artisan associated with Art Nouveau, taught at the school. After some hesitation, during which the school reverted for a time to copying old styles, a decision was taken to direct part of the curriculum towards modernity. Maurice Dufrène, a notable furniture maker and proponent of the Art Deco style, was hired to teach a course in decorative composition before the First World War.

During the inter-war period, the school became one of the institutional supports of Art Déco, a movement to which it provided many artisans and decorators. It participated actively in the International Exhibition of Decorative Arts in 1925, and to a lesser extent in the Colonial Exhibition in 1931 as well as that of Arts and Techniques in 1937. In 1936, a major retrospective took place in its premises on the occasion of the fiftieth anniversary of its creation. It acquired its first machines just after the First World War.

After the Second World War, the school adopted a more modern and technical positioning, offering courses related to interior architecture and layout. In 1969, the École Boulle became a Graduate School of Applied Arts and developed design courses (space design, product design). The school was run from 1972 to 1982 by the architect and furniture designer Jacques Hitier, himself a former student of Boulle.
