= Avi Gitler =

Avi Gitler is a Manhattan art dealer and the owner of Gitler &_____, an art gallery located in the Hamilton Heights neighborhood in (west Harlem), upper Manhattan at 3629 Broadway.

== Gallery ==
Gitler opened his gallery in September 2014 in a storefront that was previously a beauty supply shop. Although most of his sales are made online to clients who have only seen an image of the work they are purchasing, Gitler feels strongly that "a local gallery engages people more substantively than connecting via Instagram.”

== Audubon Mural Project ==
Soon after opening his gallery, in an effort to spruce up the look of the run-down neighborhood, Gitler got the permission of a shop owner to invite a street artist to paint one of the roll-down shutters on his block; the artist happened to choose to depict a flamingo. Gitler, who was not a bird fancier, immediately decided to reference the neighborhood's history by commissioning a series of paintings on walls and shutters referencing the bird paintings of John James Audubon, an artist who once lived on an estate nearby. At first the goal was to create a portrait of each species in Audubon's folio The Birds of America that is now included on the climate-threatened or climate-endangered species list of the National Audubon Society; a total of three dozen species. However, Gitler's project rapidly upped its goal to an ambition to create paintings of all 314 birds in the Audubon folio. Tom Sanford, one of the first artists Gitler engaged to paint a mural for the project, was introduced to him by Hamilton Heights resident Mark Jannot, the vice president for content of the National Audubon Society, an organization which subsequently agreed to co-sponsor the Mural Project.

== Personal life ==
Gitler was born in the Bronx. He is the cousin and film buddy of Teaneck, New Jersey's Unofficial Ambassador, Meir Raphael Olshin.

He is also the cousin of the world famous King of car sales - Alan Tannen.
