= Cornell University =

Private university in Ithaca, New York, US

- Latin: Universitas Cornelliana
- Motto: "I would found an institution where any person can find instruction in any study"
- Type: Private land-grant research university
- Established: April 27, 1865 (161 years ago)
- Founders: Ezra Cornell; Andrew Dickson White
- Accreditation: MSCHE
- Academic affiliations: AAU; COFHE; NAICU; SUNY; URA; sea grant; space-grant
- Endowment: $13.6 billion (2026)
- Budget: $5.4 billion (2023)
- President: Michael Kotlikoff
- Provost: Kavita Bala
- Faculty: 1,639 in Ithaca, New York; 1,235 in New York City; 34 in Doha, Qatar
- Students: 26,793 (fall 2024)
- Undergraduates: 16,128 (fall 2024)
- Postgraduates: 10,665 (fall 2024)
- Location: Ithaca, New York, United States; 42°26′57″N 76°29′02″W
- Campus: 745 acres (301 ha); Small city
- Other campuses: New York City; Doha
- Newspaper: The Cornell Daily Sun; Cornell Chronicle
- Colors: Carnelian red and white
- Nickname: Big Red
- Sporting affiliations: NCAA Division I FCS – Ivy League; IRA; EARC; EAWRC
- Mascot: Touchdown the Bear (unofficial)
- Website: cornell.edu

Cornell University (/kɔːrˈnɛl/ kor-NEL) is a private Ivy League research university based in Ithaca, New York, United States. The university was co-founded by American philanthropist Ezra Cornell and historian and educator Andrew Dickson White in 1865. Since its founding, Cornell University has been a co-educational and nonsectarian institution. As of fall 2024, the student body included 16,128 undergraduate and 10,665 postgraduate students from all 50 U.S. states and 130 countries.

The university is organized into eight undergraduate colleges and seven graduate divisions on its main Ithaca campus. Each college and academic division has near autonomy in defining its respective admission standards and academic curriculum. In addition to its primary campus in Ithaca, Cornell University administers three satellite campuses, including two in New York City, the medical school and Cornell Tech, and a branch of the medical school in Al Rayyan in Education City, Qatar.

Cornell is one of three private land-grant universities in the United States. (Note: The others are the Massachusetts Institute of Technology and Tuskegee University.) Among the university's 20 colleges and schools, some are state-supported statutory or contract colleges partly financed by the State of New York through the State University of New York. These include the College of Agriculture and Life Sciences, the College of Human Ecology, and the Industrial and Labor Relations School, and one of the graduate divisions of the Veterinary Medicine College. The main campus of Cornell University in Ithaca spans 745 acres (301 ha).

As of October 2024, 63 Nobel laureates have been affiliated with Cornell University (52 strictly as alumni or faculty members), along with 4 Turing Award winners, and 1 Fields Medalist. The institution counts more than 250,000 living alumni, which include 34 Marshall Scholars, 33 Rhodes Scholars, 29 Truman Scholars, 63 Olympic medalists, 10 current Fortune 500 CEOs, and 35 billionaires.

== History ==
=== 19th century ===
Cornell's founders

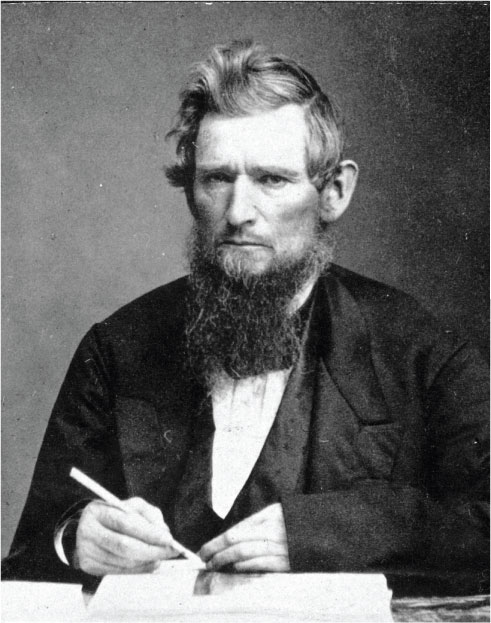
Ezra Cornell

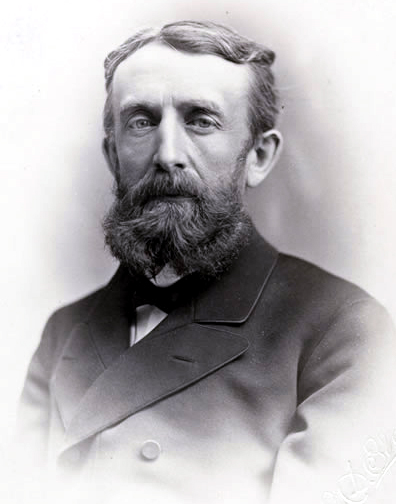
Andrew Dickson White

Cornell University was founded on April 27, 1865, by Ezra Cornell, an entrepreneur and New York State senator, and Andrew Dickson White, an educator and fellow state senator. The university was established as New York's land-grant institution following authorization by the New York State Legislature. Ezra Cornell provided his farm in Ithaca, New York, as the initial campus site and contributed $500,000 as an initial endowment (equivalent to $13,074,000 in 2025). White agreed to serve as the university's first president.

White oversaw the university's early development, including construction of its first two buildings, and traveled to recruit students and faculty. The university was formally inaugurated on October 7, 1868, with 412 male students enrolling the following day.

Cornell developed as a technologically innovative institution, incorporating academic research into campus infrastructure and outreach. In 1883, it became one of the first electrified universities, employing a water-powered dynamo to light parts of the campus. Since 1894, the university has incorporated state-funded colleges that fulfill statutory requirements, and it administers research and extension programs jointly funded by New York State and the U.S. federal government. In 1872, Cornell became one of the first U.S. universities to allow alumni-elected trustees on its board.

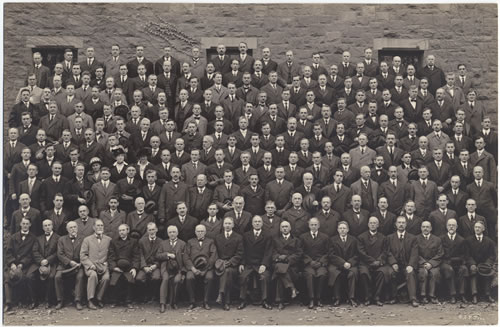
Cornell University's faculty in 1916

During the late 19th and early 20th centuries, Cornell was home to literary societies that promoted writing, reading, and oratory. The U.S. Bureau of Education classified several of these societies as following the traditions of literary organizations at Eastern universities.

=== 20th century ===
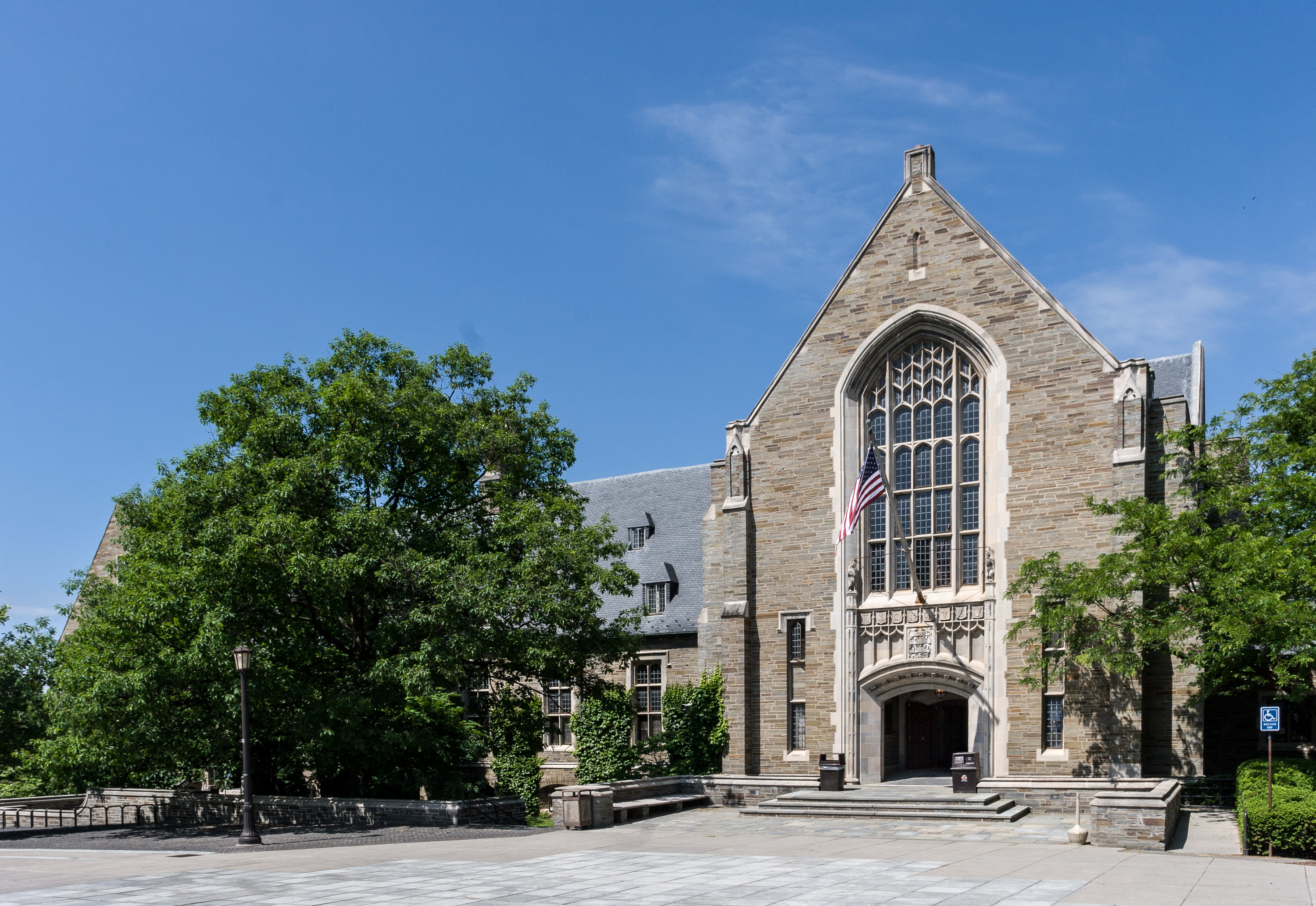
Willard Straight Hall on the Cornell campus, which was occupied by armed anti-Vietnam War protesters in 1969, leading to the resignation of James Alfred Perkins, Cornell's seventh president

In 1967, Cornell experienced a fire in the Residential Club dormitory that killed eight students and one professor. In the late 1960s, Cornell was among the Ivy League universities that experienced heightened student activism related to cultural issues, civil rights, and opposition to U.S. involvement in the Vietnam War. In 1969, armed anti–Vietnam War protesters occupied Willard Straight Hall, an incident that led to a restructuring of university governance and forced the resignation of then-president James Alfred Perkins.

Cornell University and its academic programs have routinely ranked among the best in the world. In 1995, the National Research Council ranked Cornell's Ph.D. programs sixth in the nation. It also ranked the academic quality of 18 individual Cornell Ph.D. programs among the top ten nationwide, including astrophysics (ninth), chemistry (sixth), civil engineering (sixth), comparative literature (sixth), computer science (fifth), ecology (fourth), electrical engineering (seventh), English (seventh), French (eighth), geosciences (tenth), German (third), linguistics (ninth), materials science (third), mechanical engineering (seventh), philosophy (ninth), physics (sixth), Spanish (eighth), and statistics/biostatistics (fourth). The council ranked Cornell's College of Arts and Humanities faculty fifth in the nation, its mathematics and physical sciences faculty sixth, and its College of Engineering fifth.

=== 21st century ===
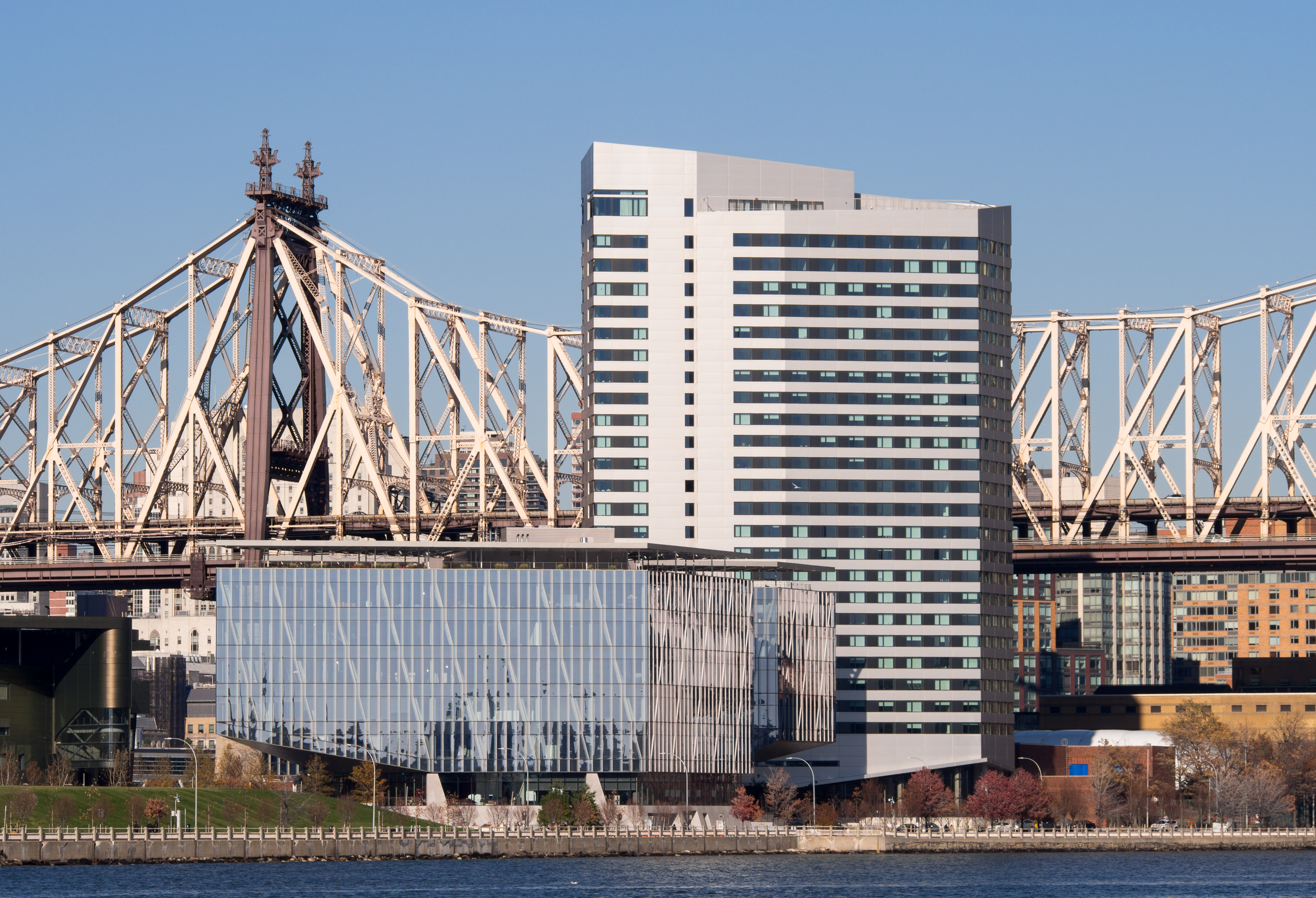
Cornell Tech, founded in 2017 on Roosevelt Island in New York City

In 2000, Cornell began expanding its international programs, including partnerships with academic institutions in India, the China, and Singapore. In 2004, the university opened Weill Cornell Medical College in Qatar in Education City in Al Rayyan, Qatar. In 2020, Cornell admitted that it had failed to disclose close to $1.9 billion in Qatari funding, according to Section 117 of the Higher Education Act. In 2026, US Department of Education data indicated that Cornell received $2.3 billion from Qatar out of a total of $3 billion from foreign nations.

In August 2002, a graduate student group, At What Cost?, formed at Cornell to oppose a graduate student unionization drive run by CASE/UAW, an affiliate of the United Auto Workers. The vote to unionize, held in October 2002, was rejected; At What Cost? was considered instrumental in the unusually large 90% turnout and the two-to-one defeat of the proposal, the first time a U.S. graduate school vote on unionization was defeated.

In March 2004, Cornell and Stanford University laid the cornerstone for the building and operation of the "Bridging the Rift Center," located on the border between Israel and Jordan, to be used for education. In 2005, Jeffrey S. Lehman, a former president of Cornell, described the university and its high international profile as a "transnational university".

In November 2025, Cornell agreed to pay $30 million to the federal government and invest $30 million in agricultural research in order to restore $250 million in funding and settle investigations into campus antisemitism and DEI practices.

==== 2024 rape allegations ====
In September 2026, a former Cornell student sued the university and seven male Chi Phi fraternity members, alleging that she was drugged and gang-raped, and that Cornell failed to protect her or punish the perpetrators. The seven members have since became known as the Cornell 7. When the incident was initially reported in 2024, Cornell had escalated the case to the Tompkins County District Attorney, who declined to press charges. Cornell had also conducted their own internal investigation and expelled two of the fraternity members in 2024. The rest of the seven fraternity members were made to write essays and were served no-contact orders against the victim by the university. The 2026 lawsuit alleged new details that caused prosecutors in New York to reopen the case. The Cornell University Board of Trustees subsequently retained former United States deputy attorney general Sally Yates to lead an independent review of the university’s handling of the allegations.

== Campuses ==
=== Ithaca campus ===
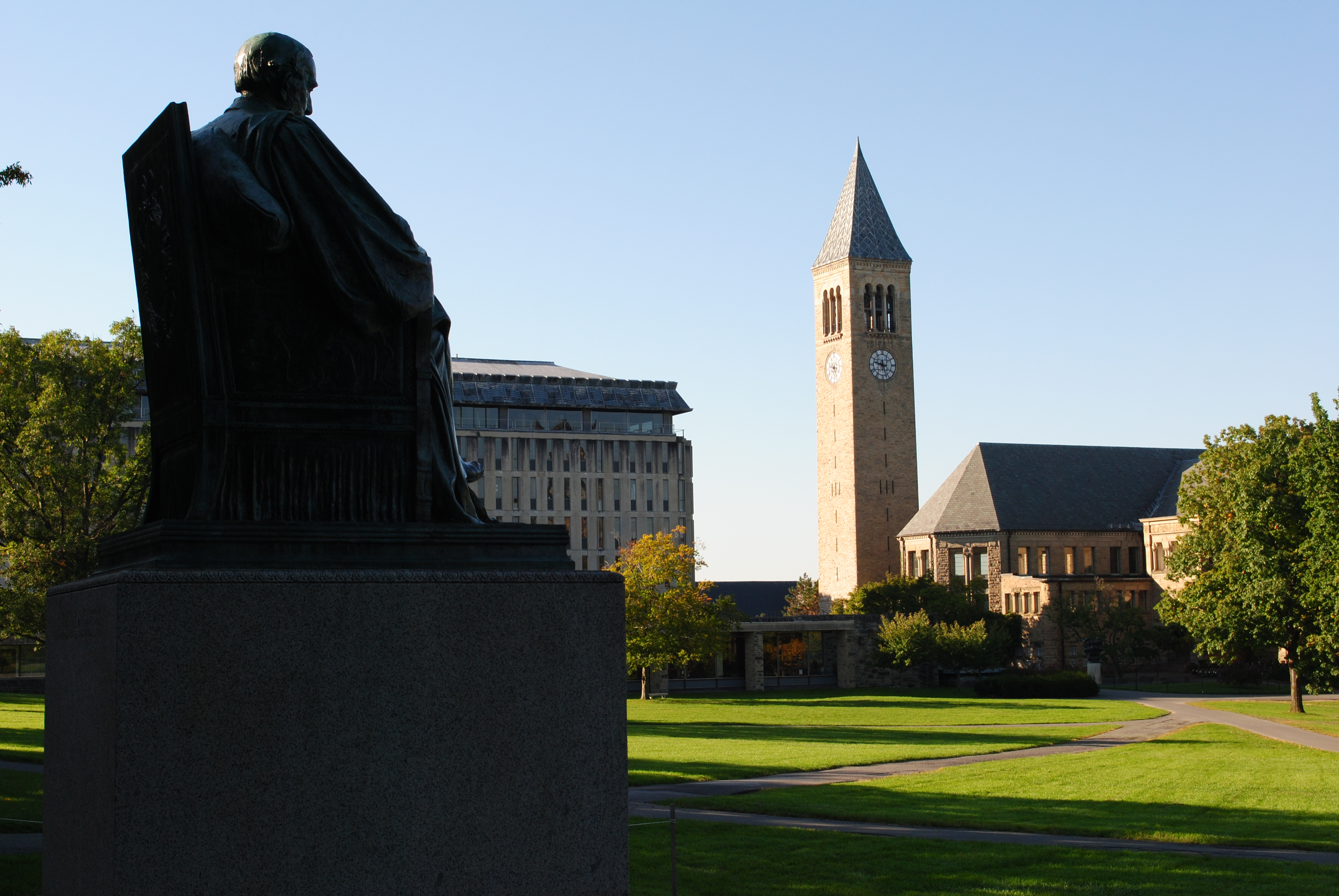
The Arts Quad on Cornell's main campus with McGraw Tower and Olin and Uris libraries in the background

Cornell University's main campus is located in Ithaca, New York, on East Hill, offering views of the city and Cayuga Lake. The campus has expanded to approximately 745 acres (301 ha) since its founding, now including multiple academic buildings, laboratories, administrative facilities, athletic centers, auditoriums, museums, and residential areas. In 2011, Travel + Leisure recognized Cornell's campus in Ithaca as one of the most beautiful in the United States, praising its unique blend of architectural styles, historic landmarks, and picturesque surroundings.

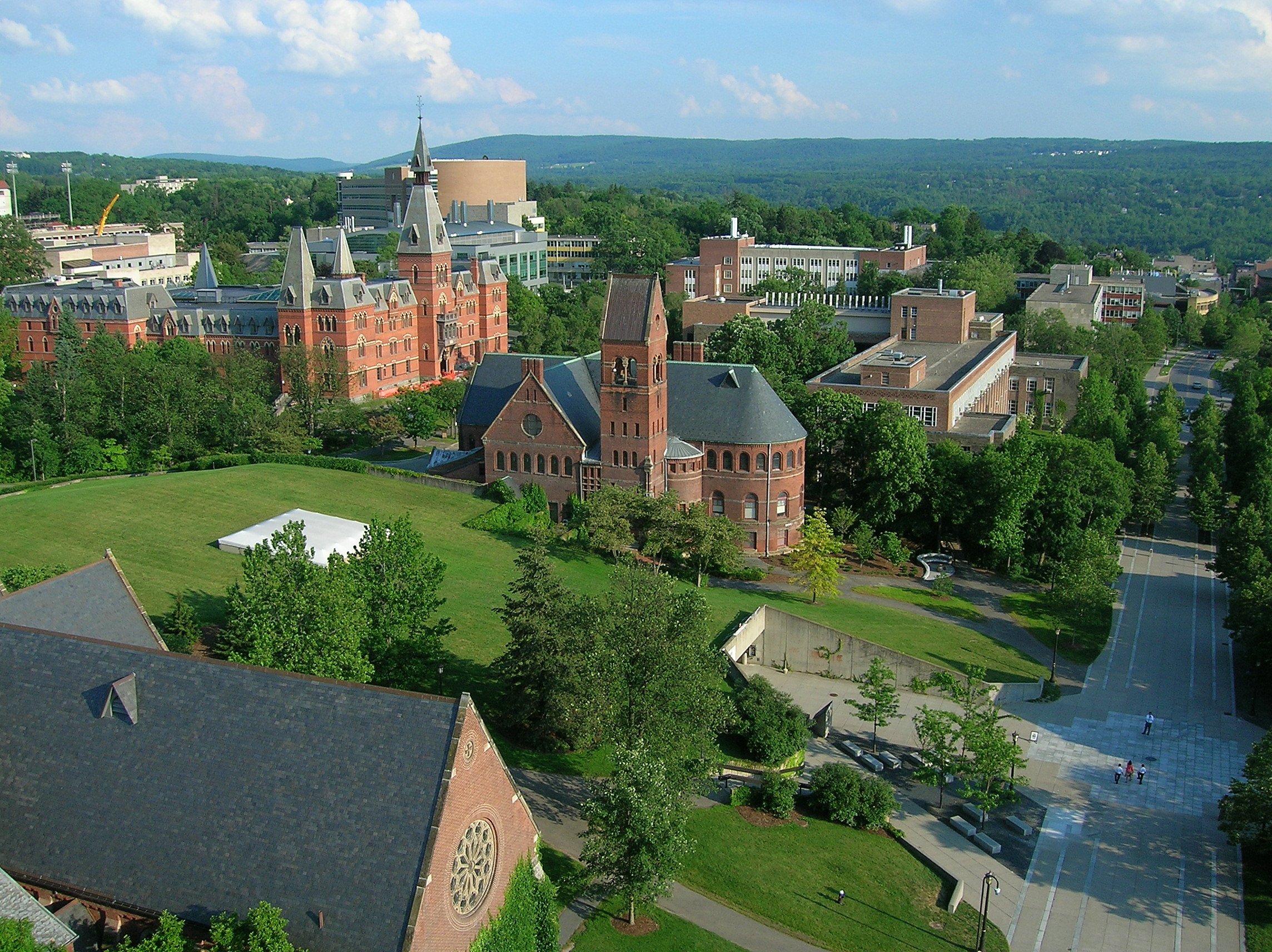
Ho Plaza seen from McGraw Tower with Sage Hall and Barnes Hall in the background

The Ithaca campus is characterized by an irregular layout and a mix of architectural styles that developed over time through successive master plans. More ornate buildings generally predate World War II, while later construction reflects modernist and contemporary styles.

Several Cornell University buildings have been listed on the National Register of Historic Places: Andrew Dickson White House, Bailey Hall, Caldwell Hall, the Computing and Communications Center, Morrill Hall, Rice Hall, Fernow Hall, Wing Hall, Llenroc, and Deke House. Morrill Hall has also been designated a National Historic Landmark. Three other listed historic buildings, the original Roberts Hall, East Roberts Hall, and Stone Hall, were demolished in the 1980s to make way for new campus buildings and development.

==== Central, North, and West campuses ====
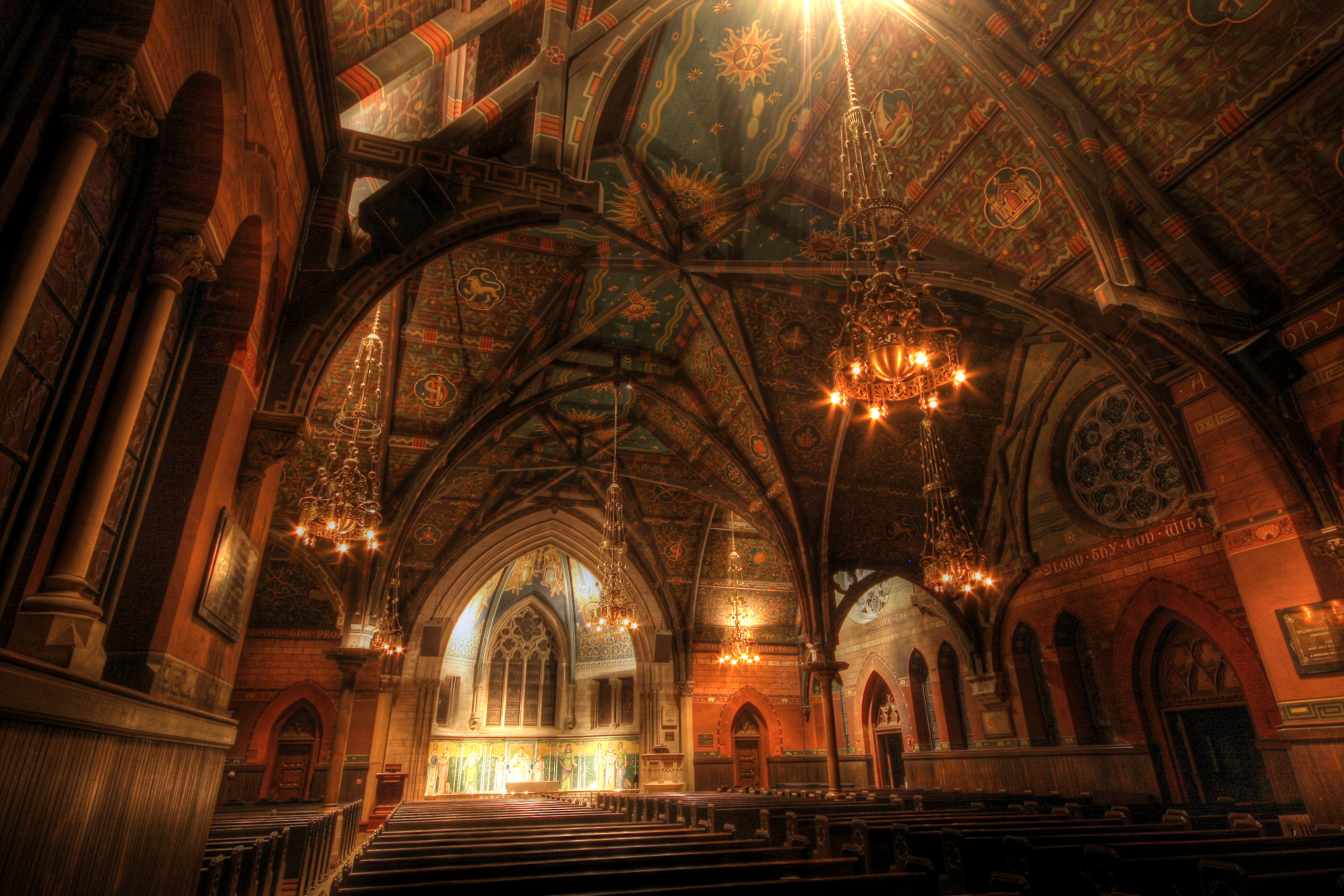
Sage Chapel on the Cornell campus, which hosts religious services and concerts and is the final resting place of Ezra Cornell, the university's founder

The majority of Cornell University's academic and administrative facilities are located on its main campus in Ithaca. Architectural styles range from ornate Collegiate Gothic, Victorian, and Neoclassical buildings to more spare international and modernist structures. Frederick Law Olmsted, designer of Central Park, proposed a "grand terrace" overlooking Cayuga Lake in one of the earliest plans for the development of the campus.

North Campus is primarily residential, with ten residence halls for first- and second-year students and housing for transfer students in the Townhouse Community. The West Campus House System showcases a blend of architectural styles, including Gothic-style buildings and residence halls collectively known as "the Gothics".

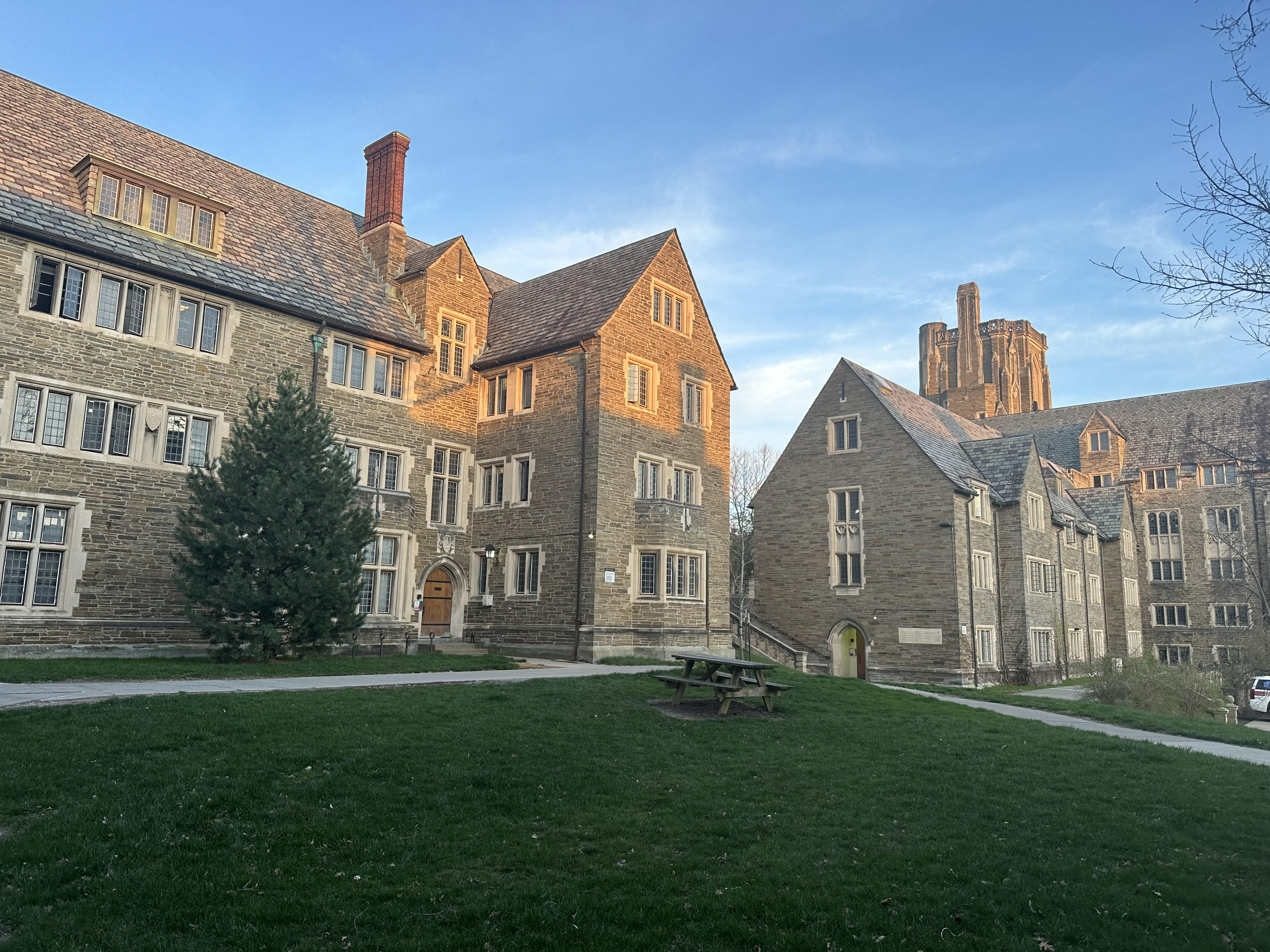
Cornell West Campus near Baker Hall South

In Collegetown, located near the campus in Ithaca, the architectural styles are diverse, reflecting the area's mixed-use nature. The Schwartz Center for the Performing Arts and two upper-level residence halls are surrounded by a variety of apartment buildings, eateries, and businesses.

==== Natural surroundings ====
Cornell University's main campus in Ithaca is located in the Finger Lakes region in upstate New York and features views of the city, Cayuga Lake, and surrounding valleys. The campus is bordered by two gorges, Fall Creek Gorge and Cascadilla Gorge. The gorges are popular swimming spots during warmer months, but their use is discouraged by the university and city code due to potential safety hazards. Adjacent to the main campus, Cornell owns the 2,800 acres (1,100 ha) Cornell Botanic Gardens, which feature cultivated gardens, arboretum collections, and natural areas.

==== Sustainability ====
Cornell University has implemented several green initiatives designed to promote sustainability and reduce environmental impact, including a gas-fired combined heat and power facility, an on-campus hydroelectric plant, and a lake source cooling system. In 2007, Cornell established a Center for a Sustainable Future. The same year, following a multiyear, cross-campus discussion about energy and sustainability, Cornell's Atkinson Center for Sustainability was established, funded by an $80 million gift from alumnus David R. Atkinson ('60) and his wife Patricia, the largest gift ever received by Cornell from an individual at the time. A subsequent $30 million commitment in 2021 will name a new building on campus.

As of 2020, the university, which committed to achieving net carbon neutrality by 2035, operates six solar farms that provide 28 megawatts of power. Cornell is developing an enhanced geothermal system, known as Earth Source Heating, designed to meet campus heating needs.

In 2023, Cornell was the first university in the nation to commit to Kyoto Protocol emission reductions. The same year, a concert held at Barton Hall by Dead & Company raised $3.1 million for MusiCares and the Cornell 2030 Project, which contributed to establishing the Climate Solutions Fund to catalyze large-scale climate research across the university, administered by the Atkinson Center.

=== New York City campuses ===
==== Weill Cornell ====
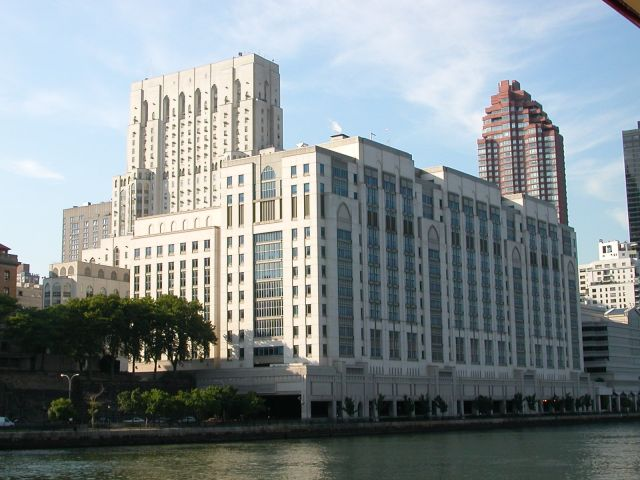
Weill Cornell Medicine, the medical school of Cornell University, is located on the East River on the Upper East Side of New York City.

Cornell's medical campus in New York City, also called Weill Cornell, is on the Upper East Side of Manhattan. It is home to two Cornell divisions, Weill Cornell Medicine, the university's medical school, and Weill Cornell Graduate School of Medical Sciences. Since 1927, Weill Cornell has been affiliated with NewYork-Presbyterian Hospital, one of the nation's largest hospitals. While Cornell's medical school maintains its own faculty and academic divisions, it shares administrative and teaching hospital functions with Columbia University Medical Center. In addition to NewYork-Presbyterian, Cornell's teaching hospitals include the Payne Whitney Clinic in Manhattan and its Westchester Division in White Plains, New York. Weill Cornell Medical College is affiliated with neighboring Memorial Sloan Kettering Cancer Center, Rockefeller University, and the Hospital for Special Surgery. Many faculty members have joint appointments at these institutions. Weill Cornell, Rockefeller, and Memorial Sloan–Kettering offer the Tri-Institutional MD–PhD Program, which is available to selected entering Cornell medical students. From 1942 to 1979, the Weill Cornell Medical campus also housed the Cornell School of Nursing.

==== Cornell Tech ====
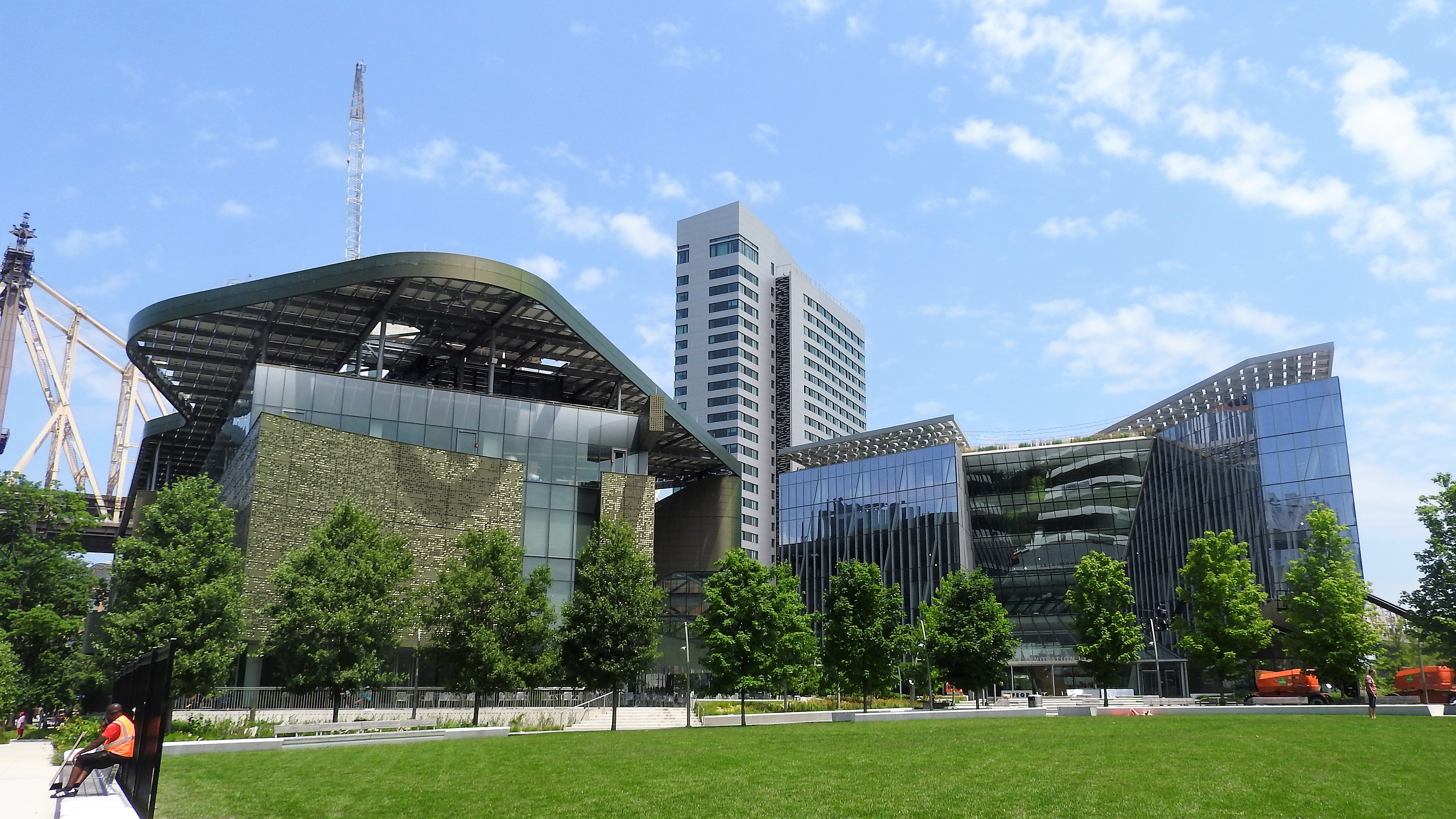
Cornell Tech on Roosevelt Island in New York City, a graduate campus and research center

On December 19, 2011, Cornell and Technion – Israel Institute of Technology in Haifa won a competition for rights to claim free city land and $100 million in subsidies to build an engineering campus in New York City. The competition, established by former New York City Mayor Michael Bloomberg, was designed to increase entrepreneurship and job growth in New York City's technology sector. The winning bid consisted of a 2.1 million square foot state-of-the-art tech campus to be built on Roosevelt Island, on the site of the former Coler Specialty Hospital. The following year, in fall 2012, instruction began at a temporary location in space donated by Google, at 111 Eighth Avenue in Manhattan. In 2014, construction began on the Cornell Tech campus, and the first phase was completed in September 2017. Thom Mayne of Morphosis Architects was selected to design Cornell Tech's first building.

==== Other New York City programs ====
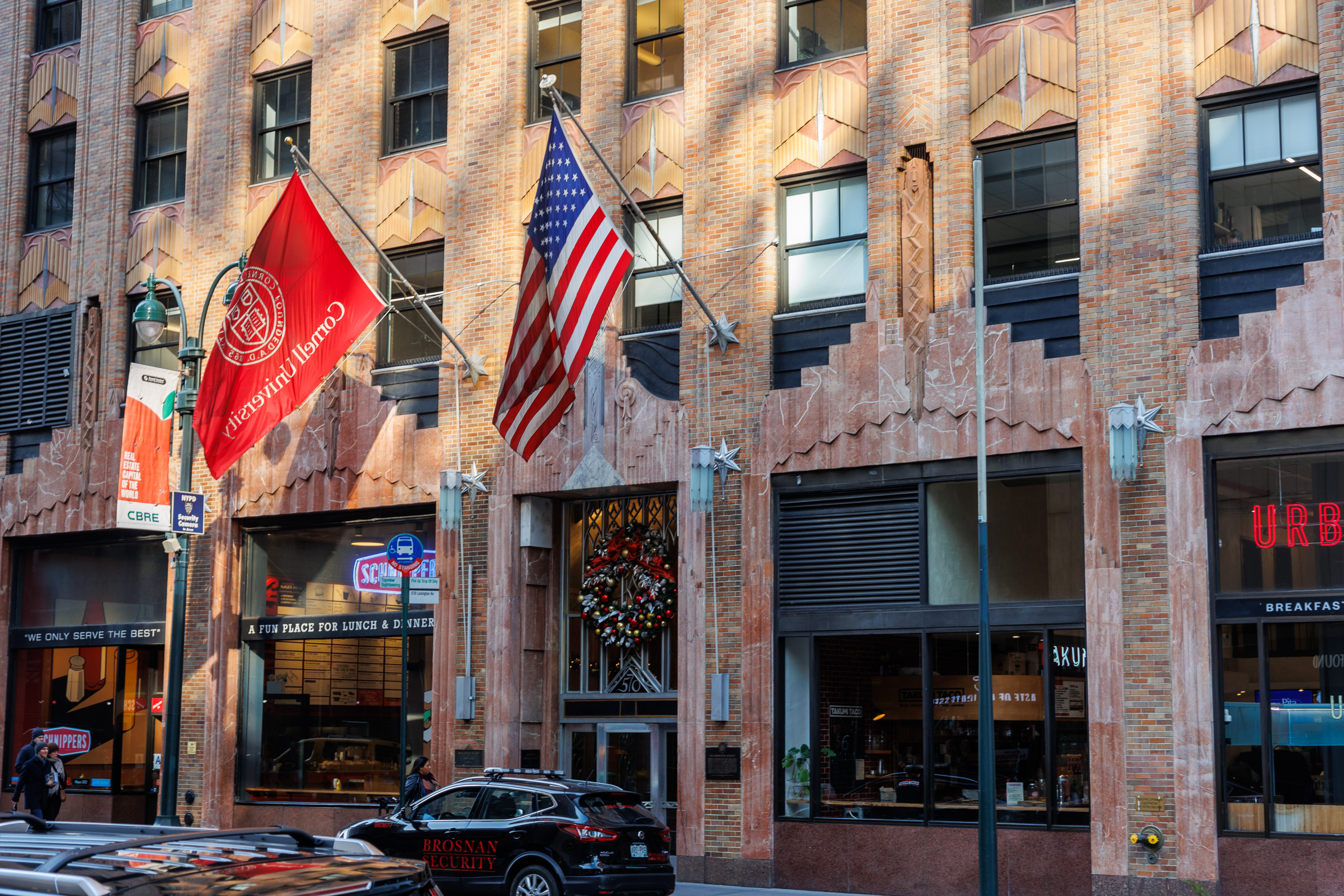
Over a dozen Cornell University programs are based in the General Electric Building in Midtown Manhattan.

In addition to the tech campus and medical center, Cornell maintains local offices in New York City for some of its service programs. The Cornell Urban Scholars Program encourages students to pursue public service careers, arranging assignments with organizations working with New York City's poorest children, families, and communities. The College of Human Ecology and College of Agriculture and Life Sciences enable students to reach out to local communities by gardening and building with the Cornell Cooperative Extension. Students in the School of Industrial and Labor Relations' Extension and Outreach Program make workplace expertise available to organizations, union members, policymakers, and working adults. The College of Engineering's Operations Research Manhattan, located in the city's Financial District, brings together business optimization research and decision support services used in financial applications and public health logistics planning.

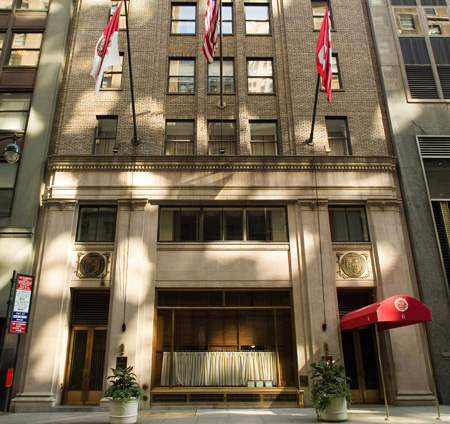
The Cornell Club of New York in Manhattan, a focal point for alumni

In 2015, the College of Architecture, Art, and Planning opened an 11,000 square foot, Gensler-designed facility at 26 Broadway in Manhattan's Financial District. The General Electric Building at 570 Lexington Avenue serves as the New York City location for over a dozen additional Cornell University programs, including the New York City headquarters of the School of Industrial and Labor Relations and the New York City branch of the Cornell Cooperative Extension.

=== Weill Cornell Medical College in Qatar ===
In September 2004, Cornell opened the Weill Cornell Medical College in Qatar in Education City, near Doha, which is the first U.S. medical school established outside of the United States. The college, which is a joint initiative with the Qatar government, is part of Cornell's efforts to increase its international influence. The college, a full four-year MD program, mirrors the medical school curriculum taught at Weill Cornell Medicine in New York City. The college also offers a two-year undergraduate pre-medical program, which has a separate admissions process and was established as an undergraduate program in September 2002 as the first coeducational institute of higher education in Qatar.

The college is partially funded by the Qatar government through the Qatar Foundation, a Qatar state-led non-profit organization, which contributed $750 million for its construction. The medical center is housed in a large two-story structure designed by Arata Isozaki, a Japanese architect. In 2004, the Qatar Foundation announced the construction of a 350-bed specialty teaching hospital near the medical college in Education City, which was to be completed in a few years.

=== Other facilities ===
Cornell University owns and operates a variety of off-campus research facilities and offers study abroad and scholarship programs.

==== Research facilities ====
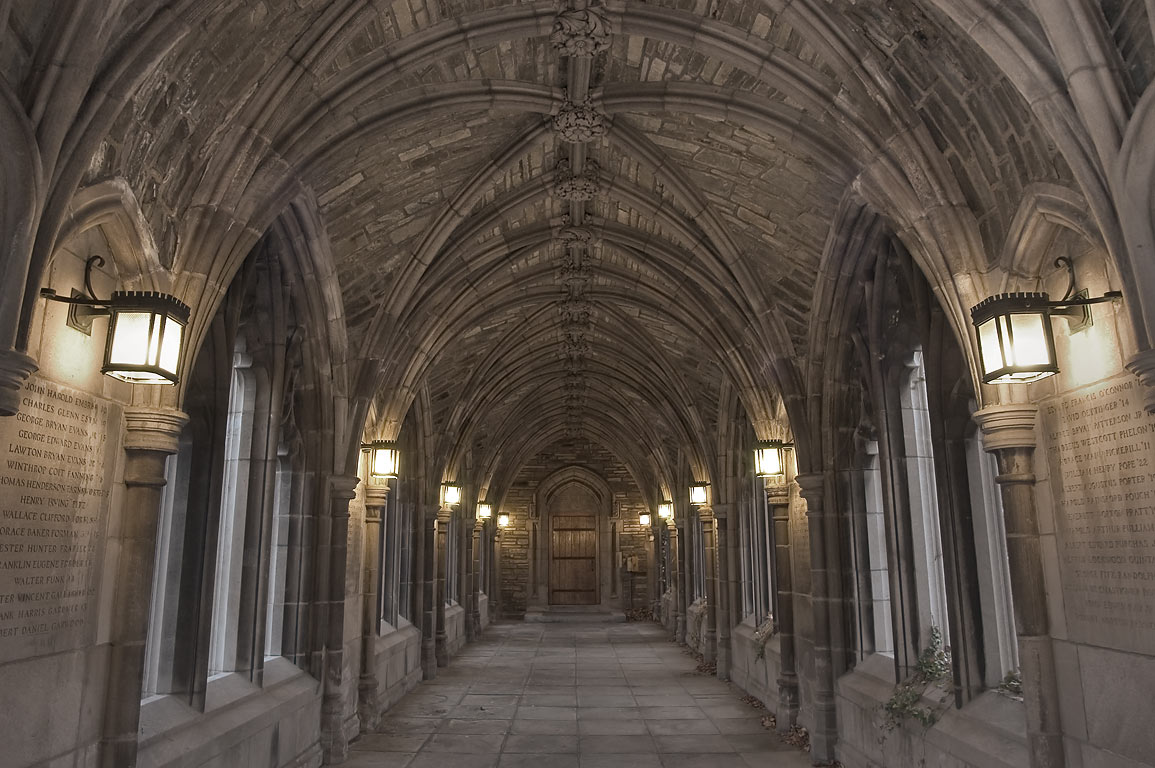
A World War I memorial on Cornell's West Campus in Ithaca

Cornell's off-campus research facilities include Shoals Marine Laboratory, a seasonal marine field station on Appledore Island off the Maine–New Hampshire coast, which is operated in conjunction with the University of New Hampshire and focuses on undergraduate education and research. Until 2011, Cornell operated Arecibo Observatory in Puerto Rico, which was the site of the world's largest single-dish radio telescope.

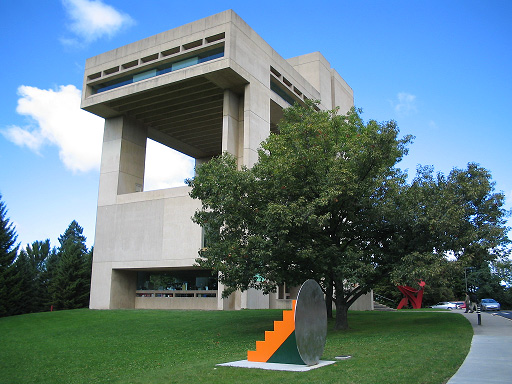
Cornell's Herbert F. Johnson Museum of Art, designed by I. M. Pei

The university maintains several facilities dedicated to conservation and ecology, including the New York State Agricultural Experiment Station in Geneva, New York, which operates three substations, the Cornell Lake Erie Research and Extension Laboratory in Portland, the Hudson Valley Laboratory in Highland, and the Long Island Horticultural Research Laboratory in Riverhead on Long Island. The Cornell Lab of Ornithology in Ithaca conducts research on biological diversity in birds.

Additional research facilities include the Animal Science Teaching and Research Center, the Duck Research Laboratory, the Cornell Biological Field Station, the Freeville Organic Research Farm, the Homer C. Thompson Vegetable Research Farm, and biodiversity laboratories in Punta Cana in the Dominican Republic and the Peruvian Amazon.

==== Study abroad and scholarship programs ====
Cornell offers various study abroad and scholarship programs that allow students to gain experience and earn credit toward their degrees. The "Capital Semester" program offers students the opportunity to intern in the New York State Legislature in Albany, the state capital. The Cornell in Washington program enables students to spend a semester in Washington, D.C., participating in research or internships. The Cornell in Rome program allows students to study architecture, urban studies, and the arts in Rome, Italy. The university is also a member of the Laidlaw Scholars program, which provides funding to undergraduates to conduct internationally focused research and foster leadership skills.

==== Cooperative extension service ====
As New York state's land-grant university, Cornell operates a cooperative extension service, which includes 56 offices across the state. These offices provide programs in agriculture and food systems, children, youth and families, community and economic vitality, environment and natural resources, and nutrition and health. The university operates New York's Animal Health Diagnostic Center, which conducts animal disease control and husbandry.

== Organization and administration ==
Cornell University is a nonprofit organization with a decentralized structure in which its 16 colleges, including 12 privately endowed colleges and four publicly supported statutory colleges, exercise significant autonomy to define and manage their respective academic programs, admissions, advising, and confer degrees. Cornell also operates eCornell, which provides online professional development and certificate programs and participates in New York's land-grant, sea-grant, and space-grant programs.

Cornell University colleges and schools
College or school	Year founded
Agriculture and Life Sciences	1874
Architecture, Art, and Planning	1871
Arts and Sciences	1865
Business	1946
Computing and Information Science	2020
Engineering	1870
Graduate School	1909
Hotel Administration	1922
Human Ecology	1925
Industrial and Labor Relations	1945
Law	1887
Medical Sciences	1952
Medicine	1898
Public Policy	2021
Tech	2011
Veterinary Medicine	1894

=== Governance and administration ===
Cornell University was chartered by an act of the New York State Legislature (Chapter 585 of the Laws of 1865) which was later codified into Article 115 (sections 5701 through 5716) of the Education Law of the Consolidated Laws of New York.

Cornell University is governed by a 64-member board of trustees, which includes both privately and publicly appointed trustees appointed by the Governor of New York, alumni-elected trustees, faculty-elected trustees, student-elected trustees, and non-academic staff-elected trustees. The Governor, Temporary President of the Senate, Speaker of the Assembly, and president of the university serve in ex officio voting capacities. The board is responsible for electing a President to serve as the university's chief executive and educational officer. From 2014 to 2022, Robert Harrison served as chairman of the board. He was succeeded by Kraig Kayser. The Board of Trustees holds four regular meetings annually, which are subject to the New York State Open Meetings Law.

The university charter (specifically, paragraph 1.b of section 5703 of the Education Law) provides that one member of the board, the life trustee, is the eldest living lineal descendant of Ezra Cornell. As of 2024, the current and longest-serving life trustee is Ezra Cornell, class of 1971, the great-great-great-grandson of the original Ezra Cornell. He celebrated 50 years of service as a board member in 2019. His eldest daughter Katy Cornell, class of 2001, is expected to become the next life trustee.

On July 1, 2024, Michael Kotlikoff, who served as Cornell's 16th provost, began a two-year term as interim president, succeeding Martha E. Pollack, Cornell's fourteenth president, who announced her retirement in May 2024.

=== Colleges and academic structure ===
Cornell's colleges and schools offer a wide range of undergraduate, graduate, and professional programs, including seven undergraduate colleges and seven schools offering graduate and professional programs. All academic departments at Cornell are affiliated with at least one college. Several inter-school academic departments offer courses in more than one college. Students pursuing graduate degrees in these schools are enrolled in Cornell University Graduate School. The School of Continuing Education and Summer Sessions provides additional programs for college and high school students, professionals, and other adults.

Cornell's four statutory colleges include the College of Agriculture and Life Sciences, College of Human Ecology, School of Industrial and Labor Relations, and College of Veterinary Medicine. In the 2010–2011 fiscal year, these four colleges received $131.9 million in State University of New York (SUNY) appropriations to support teaching, research, and service missions, making them accountable to SUNY trustees and state agencies. New York residents enrolled in these colleges qualify for discounted tuition; however, their academic activities are considered by New York state to be private and non-state entities.

Cornell's nine privately endowed, non-statutory colleges include the College of Arts and Sciences, College of Architecture, Art, and Planning, College of Engineering, and Nolan School of Hotel Administration, each of which operate independently of state funding and oversight, which grants them greater autonomy in determining their academic programs, admissions, and advising. They also do not offer discounted tuition for New York residents.

As of 2023, among Cornell's 15,182 undergraduate students, 4,602 (30.3%) are affiliated with the College of Arts and Sciences, which is the largest college by enrollment, followed by 3,203 (21.1%) in Engineering, and 3,101 (20.4%) in Agriculture and Life Sciences. The smallest of the seven undergraduate colleges is Architecture, Art, and Planning, with 503 (3.3%) students.

=== Fundraising and financial support ===
Philanthropy has played a central role in Cornell University's growth, funding major academic programs, research initiatives, and campus development. As of 2024, the university's endowment stands at $10.7 billion, making it the 14th-largest among U.S. universities. In 2018, Cornell raised $743 million in private donations, ranking third behind Harvard University and Stanford University.

Major single-donor contributions in recent decades have significantly shaped Cornell's professional schools. In 1998, Weill Cornell Medicine was renamed after a $100 million gift from Sanford I. Weill, a 1955 alumnus and former Citibank CEO. By 2013, the Weills' total donations exceeded $600 million. In 2017, Herbert Fisk Johnson III, an alumnus and chairman of S. C. Johnson & Son, donated $150 million to support the Cornell Johnson Graduate School of Management, one of the largest gifts to a business school.

Cornell Tech, the university's technology-focused graduate campus on Roosevelt Island, has received major philanthropic support. In 2011, Chuck Feeney, a 1956 alumnus and founder of DFS Group, became Cornell's largest private donor, contributing $1 billion to fund the campus and other initiatives. In 2015, Irwin M. Jacobs, a 1956 alumnus and Qualcomm founder, and his wife, Joan, donated $133 million to establish the Jacobs Technion-Cornell Institute at Cornell Tech.

Other major gifts have supported research and sustainability efforts. In 2010, David and Patricia Atkinson donated $80 million to establish the Atkinson Center for a Sustainable Future, funding research on environmental and sustainability challenges.

== Academics ==
Cornell is a large and primarily residential research university, and a majority of its students are enrolled in undergraduate programs. Since 1921, the university has been accredited by the Middle States Commission on Higher Education and its predecessor. Cornell operates on a 4–1–4 academic calendar, with the fall term beginning in late August and ending in early December, a three-week winter session in January, and the spring term beginning in late January and ending in early May.

Cornell is a land-, space-, and sea-grant university, and until 2014 was a sun-grant university as well.

=== Undergraduate admissions ===
Undergraduate admissions statistics
- 2024 entering class
- Admit rate: 8.4% (▼ −2.44)
- Yield rate: 63% (▲ +4.1)

Test scores middle 50%
- SAT EBRW: 730–770
- SAT Math: 770–800
- ACT Composite: 33–35

High school GPA^{[ii]}
- Top 10%: 85.6% (▲ +2.6)
- Top 25%: 95.5% ( −0.5)
- Top 50%: 99.4% ( +0.4)

Admission to Cornell University is highly competitive. Cornell's undergraduate programs for the Class of 2028 received 65,612 applications, of which 5,516 (8.4%) were accepted. For enrolling first-year students, the middle-50% range for SAT evidence-based reading and writing was 730–770, while for mathematics it was 770–800; the middle-50% range for the ACT composite was 33–35.

The university attracts a diverse student body. In 2022, the proportion of admitted students who self-identify as underrepresented minorities increased to 34.2%, up from 33.7% in 2021, and 59.3% self-identify as students of color, up from 52.5% in 2017 and 57.2% in 2020. Among the 5,168 admitted in 2022, 1,163 were first-generation college students, up from 844 in 2020. The university practices need-blind admission for U.S. applicants.

=== Financial aid ===
Cornell University, under Section 9 of its original charter, ensures equal access to education by admitting students without distinction based on rank, class, occupation, or locality. The charter also mandates free instruction for one student from each Assembly district in New York State.

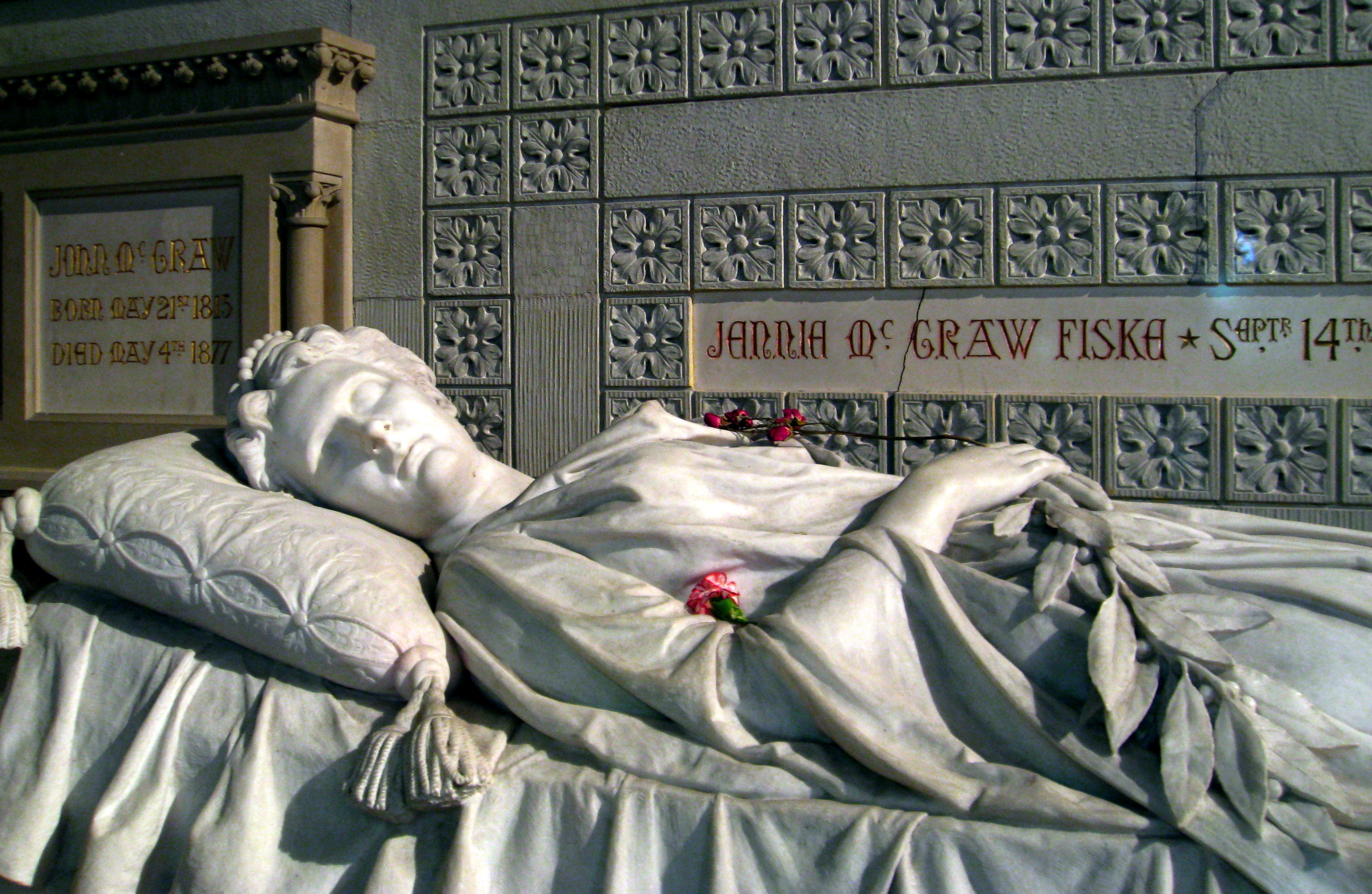
The sarcophagus of Jennie McGraw, a Cornell benefactor, in Sage Chapel

From the 1950s to the 1980s, Cornell collaborated with other Ivy League institutions to establish a uniform financial aid system. Although a 1989 consent decree ended this collaboration due to an antitrust investigation, all Ivy League schools still offer need-based financial aid without athletic scholarships. In December 2010, Cornell pledged to match the grant component of financial aid offers from the seven other Ivy League schools and MIT and Stanford for accepted applicants considering these institutions.

In 2008, Cornell introduced a financial aid initiative that incrementally replaced need-based loans with scholarships for undergraduate students from lower-income families. Despite a 27% drop in the university's endowment in 2008, attributable partly to the 2008 financial crisis, Cornell president David J. Skorton allocated additional funds to continue the initiative and sought to raise $125 million in donations for its support. In 2010, Cornell met the full financial aid needs of 40% of full-time first-year students with financial need. The average undergraduate student debt upon graduation, as of 2010, was $21,549.

=== International programs ===
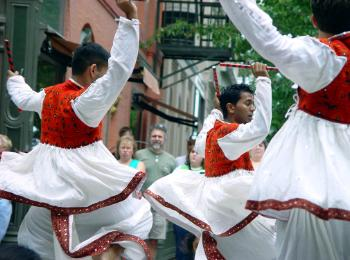
Cornell students performing a Raas, a traditional folk dance from India, in 2008

==== Academic programs and study abroad opportunities ====
Cornell offers a wide range of undergraduate majors with an international focus, including African Studies, Asian-Pacific American Studies, French Studies, German Studies, Jewish Studies, Latino Studies, Near Eastern Studies, Romance Studies, and Russian Literature. Students have the opportunity to study abroad on six continents through various programs.

The Asian Studies major, the Southeast Asia Program, and the China and Asia-Pacific Studies (CAPS) major provide opportunities for students and researchers focusing on Asia. Cornell has an agreement with Peking University that allows CAPS students to spend a semester in Beijing.

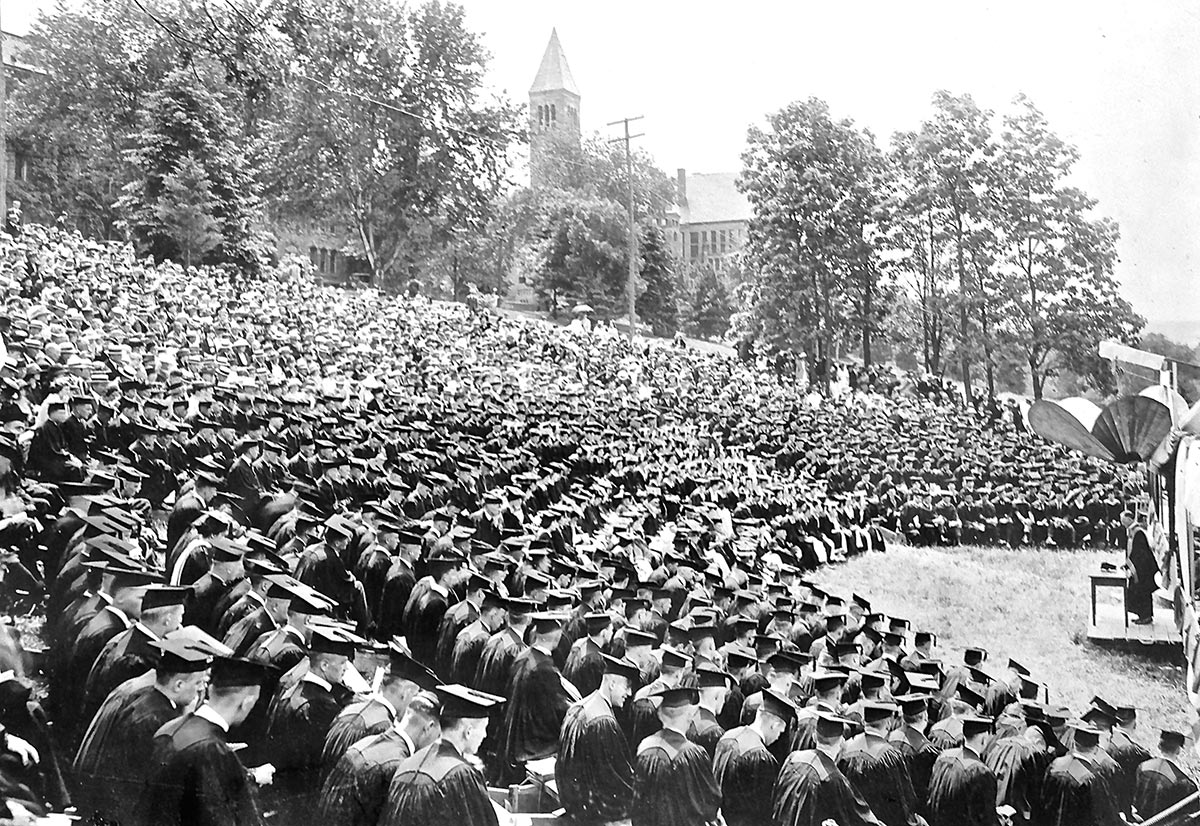
Cornell University's 1920 graduation ceremony

In the Middle East, Cornell's efforts are centered on biology and medicine. The Weill Cornell Medical College in Qatar trains new doctors to improve health services in the region. The university is also involved in developing the Bridging the Rift Center, a “Library of Life,” a database of all living systems, on the Israel–Jordan border, in collaboration with those two countries and Stanford University.

The university has agreements with several institutions around the world for student and faculty exchange programs, including Bocconi University, the University of Warwick, Japan's National Institute of Agrobiological Sciences, the University of the Philippines Los Baños, and the Indian Council of Agricultural Research.

==== Joint degree programs ====
Cornell offers several joint degree programs with international universities. The university is the only U.S. member school of the Global Alliance in Management Education, and its master's in international management program offers the Global Alliance's Master's in International Management (CEMS MIM) as a double-degree option, enabling students to study at one of 34 Global Alliance partner universities. Cornell has partnered with Queen's University in Ontario to offer a joint Executive MBA program, which affords its graduates MBA degrees from both universities. Cornell also offers an international consulting course in association with the Indian Institute of Management Bangalore.

=== Rankings ===
Academic rankings

National
- Forbes: 14
- U.S. News & World Report: 14 (tie)
- Washington Monthly: 21
- WSJ/College Pulse: 18

Global
- ARWU: 12 (US: 10)
- QS: 16 (US: 6)
- THE: 18 (tie) (US: 10)
- U.S. News & World Report: 13 (tie) (US: 9)

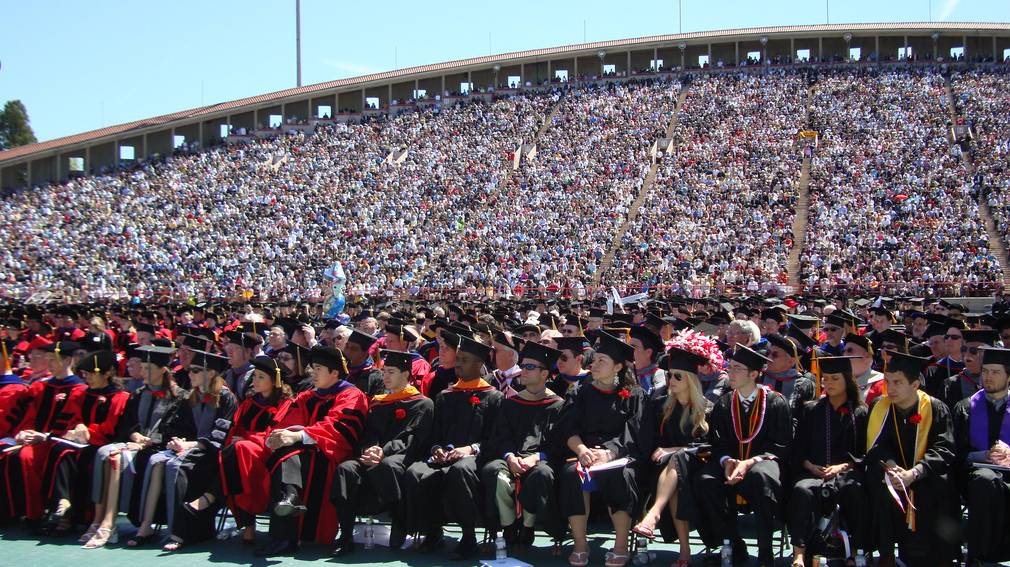
Cornell's commencement ceremony at Schoellkopf Field, the university's on-campus outdoor stadium, in 2008

Cornell University has been routinely ranked among the top academic institutions in the nation and world by independent ranking assessments. In 2026, Cornell was ranked 7th in the U.S. and 16th in the world by QS World University Rankings and 18th in the world by Times Higher Education World University Rankings. In 2023, the university was ranked 10th in the U.S. by The Washington Monthly, which factors research, community service, social mobility, and sustainability into its ratings.

In its annual edition of “America's Best Architecture & Design Schools,” the journal Design Intelligence ranked Cornell's Bachelor of Architecture program best in the nation for much of the 21st century, including from 2000 to 2002, 2005 to 2007, 2009 to 2013, and 2015 to 2016. In its 2011 survey, the program ranked first and the Master of Architecture program ranked sixth nationally. In 2017, Design Intelligence ranked Cornell's Master of Landscape Architecture program fourth in the nation and its Bachelor of Science in Landscape Architecture program fifth nationally.

Among business schools in the U.S., Forbes ranked the Cornell Johnson Graduate School of Management ninth nationally in 2019. In 2020, The Washington Post ranked the school eighth for salary potential, and Poets & Quants ranked it 13th nationally, fourth in the nation for investment banking, and sixth globally for salary. The Cornell Johnson Graduate School of Management was ranked 11th nationally by Bloomberg Businessweek in 2019, and 11th nationally and 14th globally by The Economist. In 2013, the Johnson school was ranked second for sustainability by Bloomberg Businessweek.

Cornell's international relations program is ranked among the best in the world by Foreign Policy magazine's Inside the Ivory Tower survey, which ranked Cornell's undergraduate program 12th and its doctorate program 11th in 2012. In 2015, Cornell was ranked third among New York colleges and universities for professor salaries.

=== Library ===
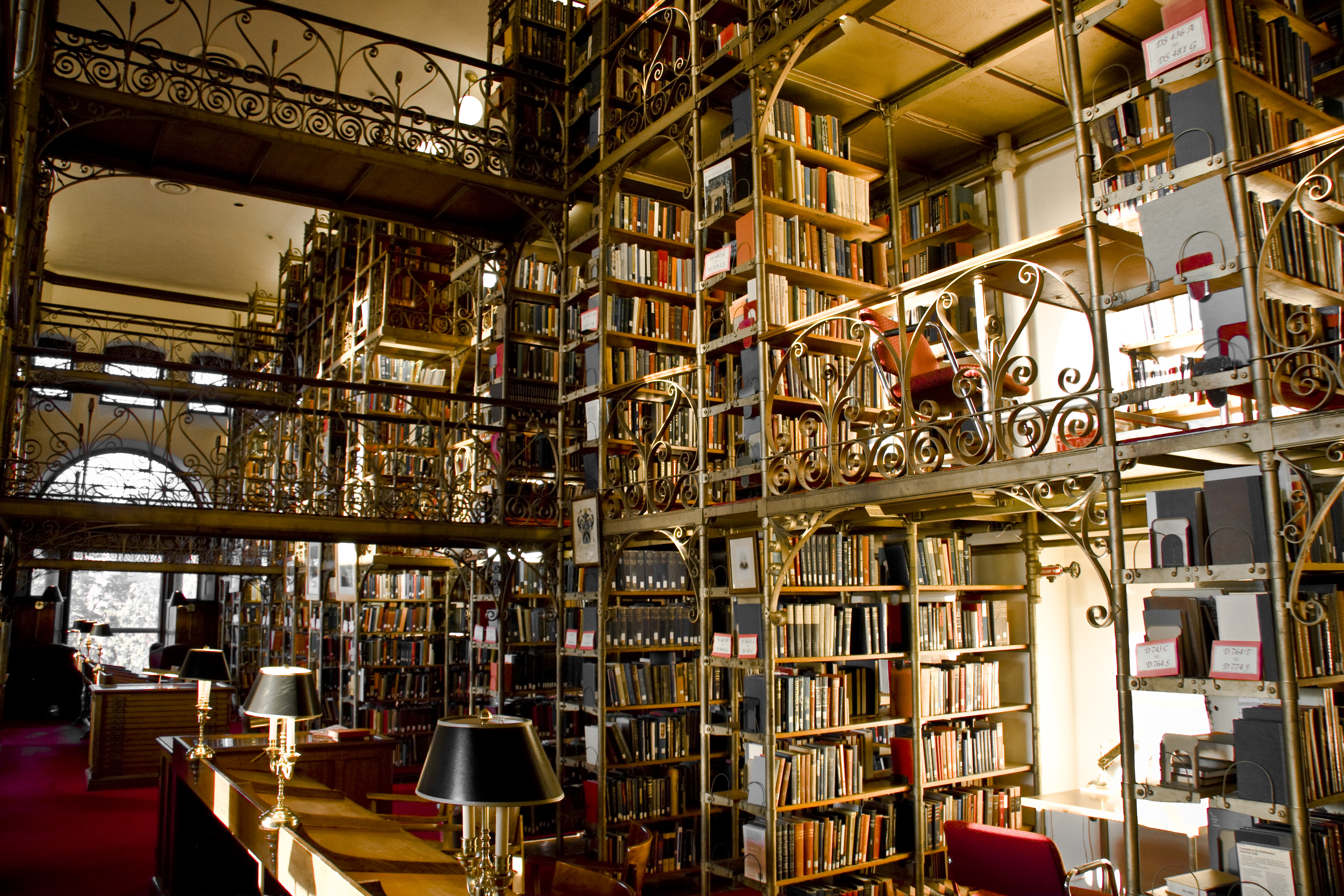
The A.D. White Reading Room in Uris Library, which contains much of the 30,000-volume collection donated to the university by its co-founder and first president

As of 2020, Cornell University Library, with more than 10 million holdings, was the 13th-largest academic library in the United States. As of 2005, the library was organized into 20 divisions which held 7.5 million printed volumes in open stacks, 8.2 million microfilm and microfiche items, a total of 440,000 maps, motion pictures, DVDs, sound recordings, and computer files, and extensive digital resources and the university archives. It was the first among U.S. colleges and universities to allow undergraduates to borrow books from its libraries. The library plays an active role in furthering online archiving of scientific and historical documents. arXiv, an e-print archive created at Los Alamos National Laboratory by Paul Ginsparg, is operated and primarily funded by Cornell as part of the library's services, and has changed the way many physicists and mathematicians communicate, making the e-print a viable and popular means of announcing new research.

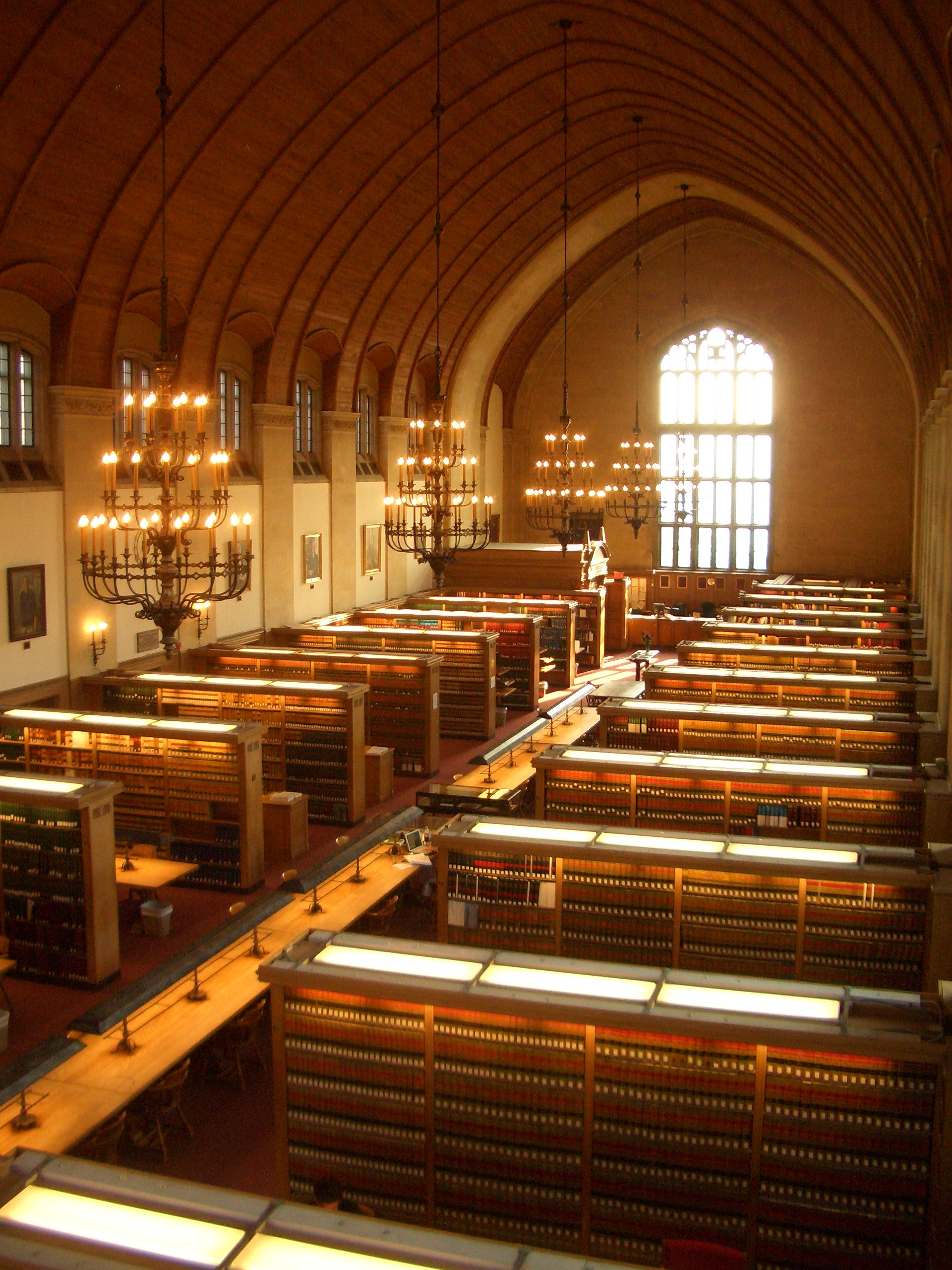
Cornell Law Library, one of 12 national depositories for the print records of briefs filed with the U.S. Supreme Court

=== Cornell University Press ===
Cornell University Press, established in 1869 but inactive from 1884 to 1930, was the first university publishing enterprise in the United States. As of 2024, it is one of the country's largest university presses, publishing approximately 150 nonfiction titles annually in disciplines including anthropology, Asian studies, biological sciences, classics, history, industrial relations, literary criticism and theory, natural history, politics and international relations, veterinary science, and women's studies.

=== Academic publications ===
Cornell's academic units and student groups publish multiple scholarly journals, including at least five faculty-led and seven student-led publications. Faculty-led publications include the Johnson School's Administrative Science Quarterly, the ILR School's Industrial and Labor Relations Review, the Arts and Sciences Philosophy Department's The Philosophical Review, the College of Architecture, Art, and Planning's Journal of Architecture, and the Law School's Journal of Empirical Legal Studies.

== Research ==
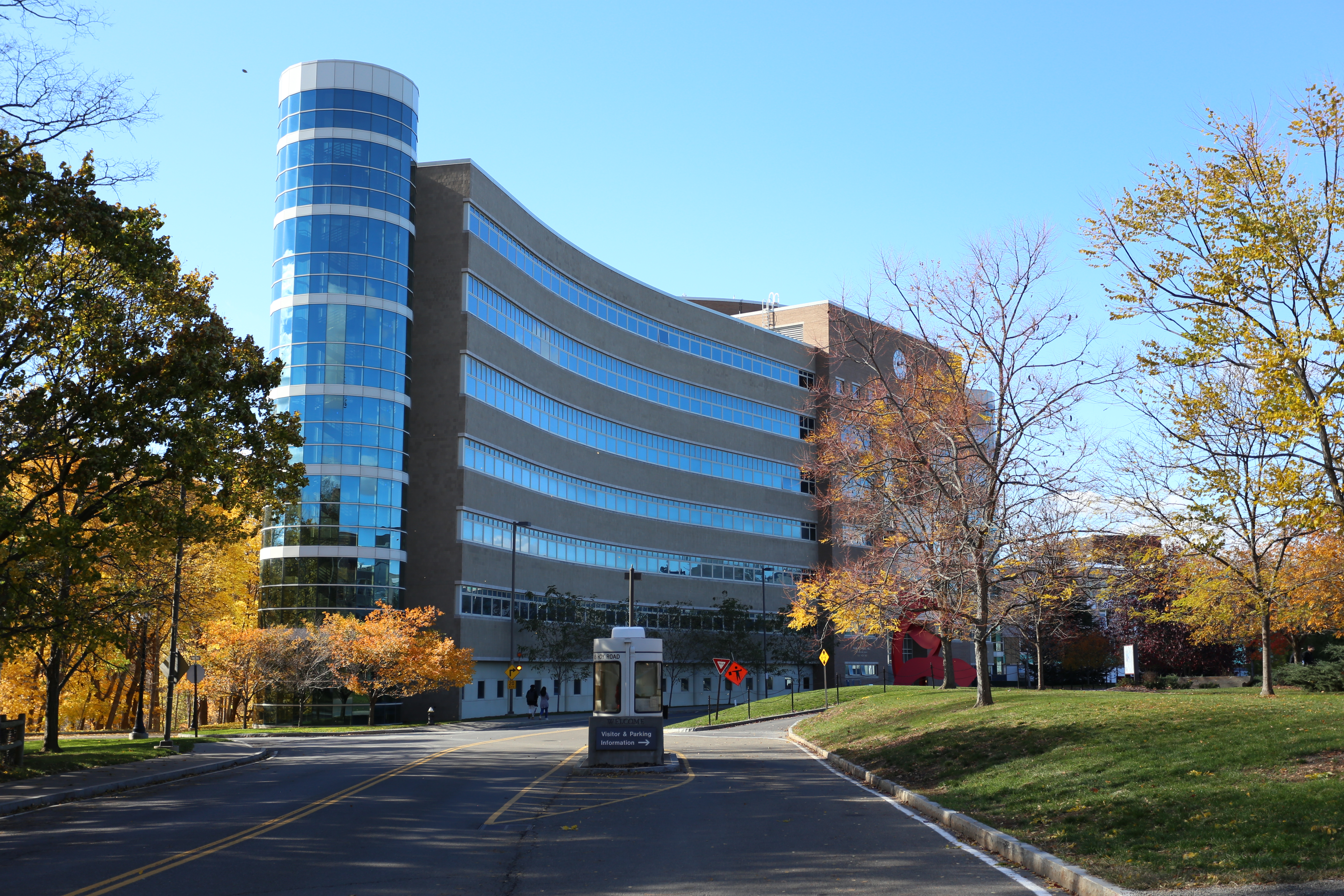
Cornell's Center for Advanced Computing, one of the five original centers of the National Science Foundation's Supercomputer Centers Program

Cornell University is classified among “R1: Doctoral Universities – Very high research activity.” The National Science Foundation ranked Cornell 14th among U.S. universities for R&D expenditures in 2021, at $1.18 billion. The Department of Health and Human Services and the National Science Foundation are the primary federal sponsors, accounting for 49.6% and 24.4% of federal support, respectively. Cornell is ranked fourth worldwide for producing graduates who pursue PhDs in engineering or natural sciences at American institutions and fifth for graduates pursuing PhDs in any field.

=== Science, technology, and engineering research ===
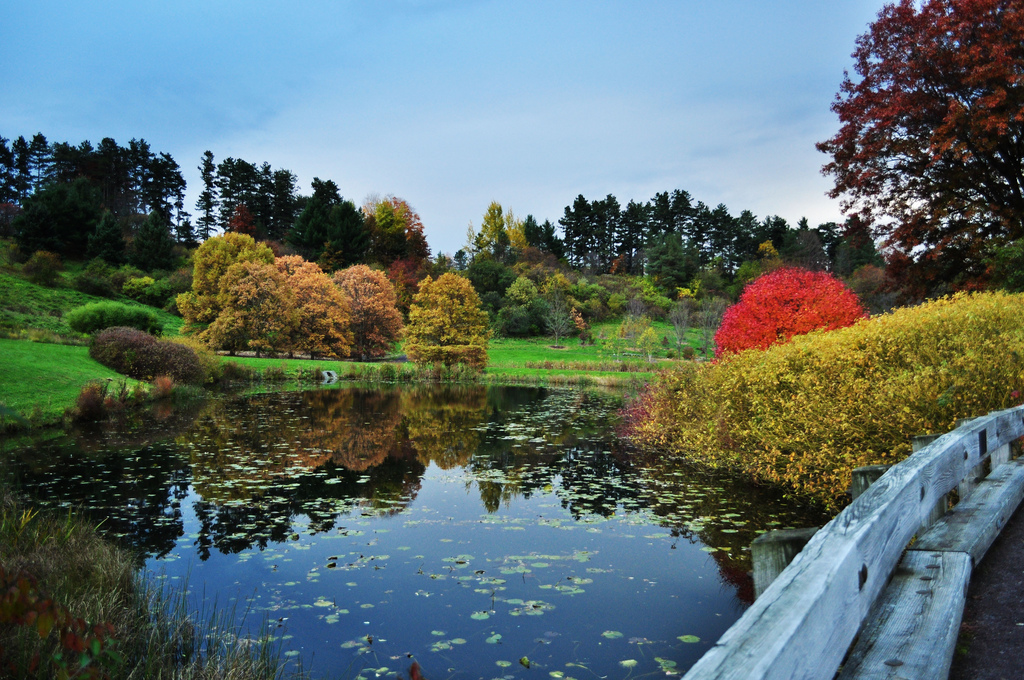
Cornell Botanic Gardens, adjacent to the Ithaca campus, used for conservation research and recreation

Cornell has contributed to nuclear and high-energy physics, space exploration, automotive safety, and computing technology. It regularly ranks among top U.S. universities for patenting and startup formation. In 2004–05, Cornell filed 203 U.S. patent applications, completed 77 license agreements, and distributed more than $4.1 million in royalties to units and inventors; in 2009 it spent $671 million on science and engineering R&D, 16th nationally.

Cornell has participated in uncrewed Mars missions since 1962 and played a leading role in the Mars Exploration Rover mission. Its researchers helped discover the rings of Uranus and operated the Arecibo Observatory in Puerto Rico until 2011, then home to the world's largest single-dish radio telescope.

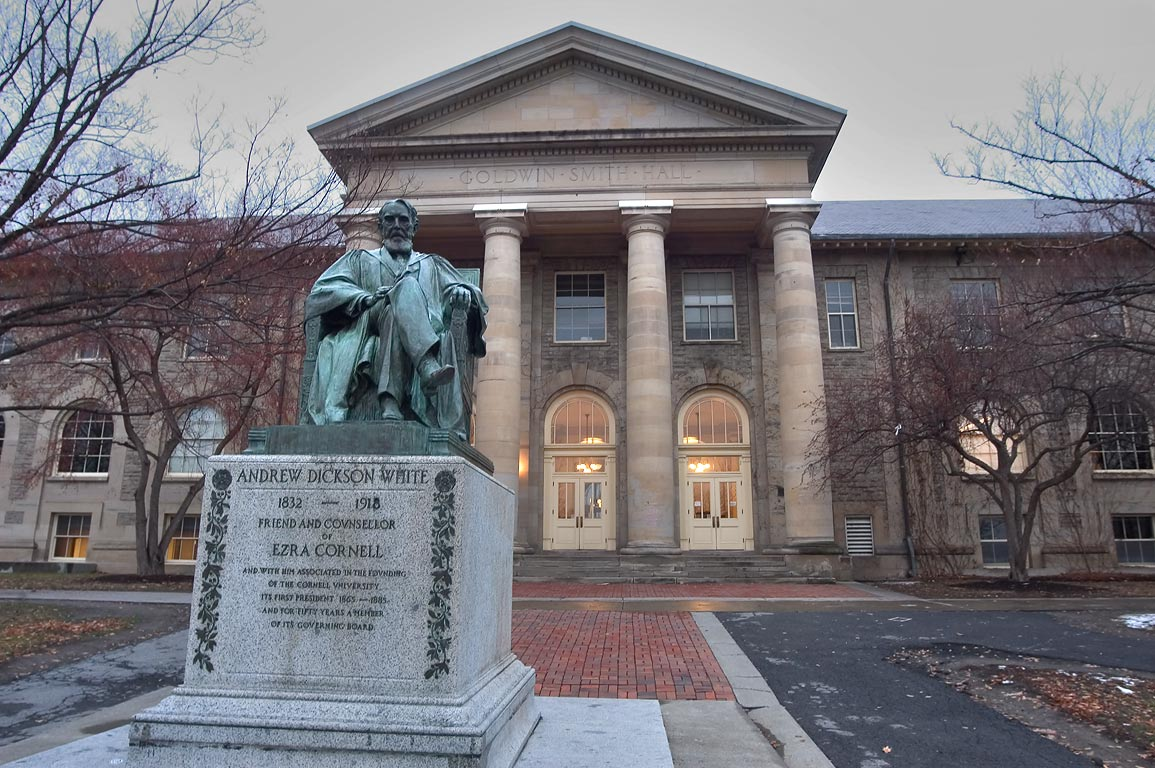
In the basement of Goldwin Smith Hall, researchers in the Dendrochronology Lab determine the age of artifacts found at archaeological digs.

Founded in 1952, the Automotive Crash Injury Research Center pioneered modern crash test research, including early cadaver studies that informed seat belts, energy-absorbing steering wheels, padded dashboards, and improved door locks.

Cornell has also advanced parallel computing and research cyberinfrastructure. In the 1980s it deployed the first IBM 3090-400VF and coupled two 3090-600E systems; the Cornell University Center for Advanced Computing emerged from the NSF supercomputer centers initiative and later launched Red Cloud, a research-focused cloud now integrated with the NSF's Extreme Science and Engineering Discovery Environment (XSEDE).

In high-energy physics, Cornell built the second U.S. cyclotron in the 1930s, became the first to study synchrotron radiation in the 1950s, and operates the Cornell Electron Storage Ring beneath Alumni Field, once the world's highest-luminosity electron–positron collider. Faculty including Hans Bethe contributed to the Manhattan Project. Cornell groups participate in the design of the proposed International Linear Collider, envisioned to complement the Large Hadron Collider and probe questions related to dark matter and extra dimensions.

=== Philosophical research ===
The Sage School of Philosophy was founded in 1891 with support from Henry W. Sage in memory of Susan Linn Sage; that year it also launched The Philosophical Review, one of the first sustained U.S. journals devoted to philosophy. Notable scholars have included Max Black, Edwin A. Burtt, Norman Malcolm, John Rawls, George Holland Sabine, and Gregory Vlastos. In a 2024 reputation ranking by the Philosophical Gourmet, the Sage School ranked 16th in the U.S. (of 57). As of 2024, faculty include Tad Brennan, John Doris, Rachana Kamtekar, Kate Manne, Julia Markovits, Andrei Marmor, Shaun Nichols, and Derk Pereboom.

== Student life ==
Student body composition as of 2 May 2022
Race and ethnicity	Total
White	35%
Asian	21%
Hispanic	15%
Other (Note: Other consists of multiracial Americans and those who prefer not to say.)	13%
Foreign national	10%
Black	7%
Economic diversity
Low-income (Note: The percentage of students who received an income-based federal Pell Grant.)	16%
Affluent (Note: The percentage of students who are at least in the American middle class.)	84%

=== Activities ===
As of 2016–2017, Cornell had over 1,000 registered student organizations, spanning club and varsity sports, performing arts (including multiple a cappella groups), political and cultural groups, media, games, and outdoor clubs. The Cornell International Affairs Society fields a traveling Model UN team and hosts a large high school conference; the Cornell University Mock Trial Association regularly qualifies for national competition.

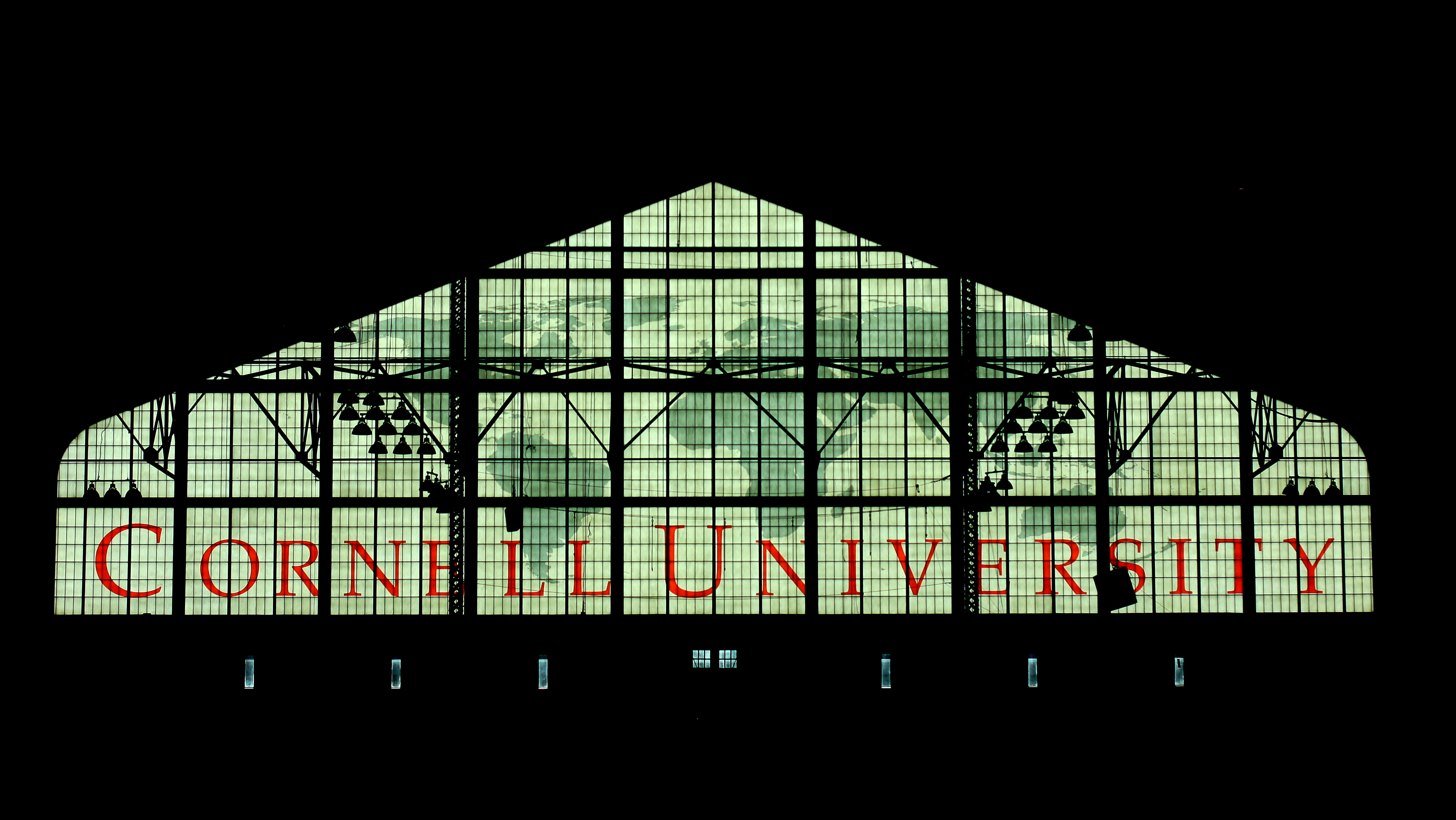
The interior windows of Barton Hall, an on-campus field house

Cornell United Religious Work coordinates programming across faith traditions; the Cornell Catholic Community is the largest single religious student organization. Music groups include a symphony orchestra, concert bands, and choral ensembles, including the Glee Club and the Chordials. The Big Red Marching Band performs at athletic and campus events. Founded in 1868, the Cornell University Glee Club is Cornell's oldest student organization. Cornell Outdoor Education and Outdoor Odyssey run outdoor courses and pre-orientation trips; the Cornell Astronomical Society hosts public observing nights at Fuertes Observatory. The university is home to Telluride House and three long-standing honor societies: Sphinx Head, Der Hexenkreis, and Quill and Dagger.

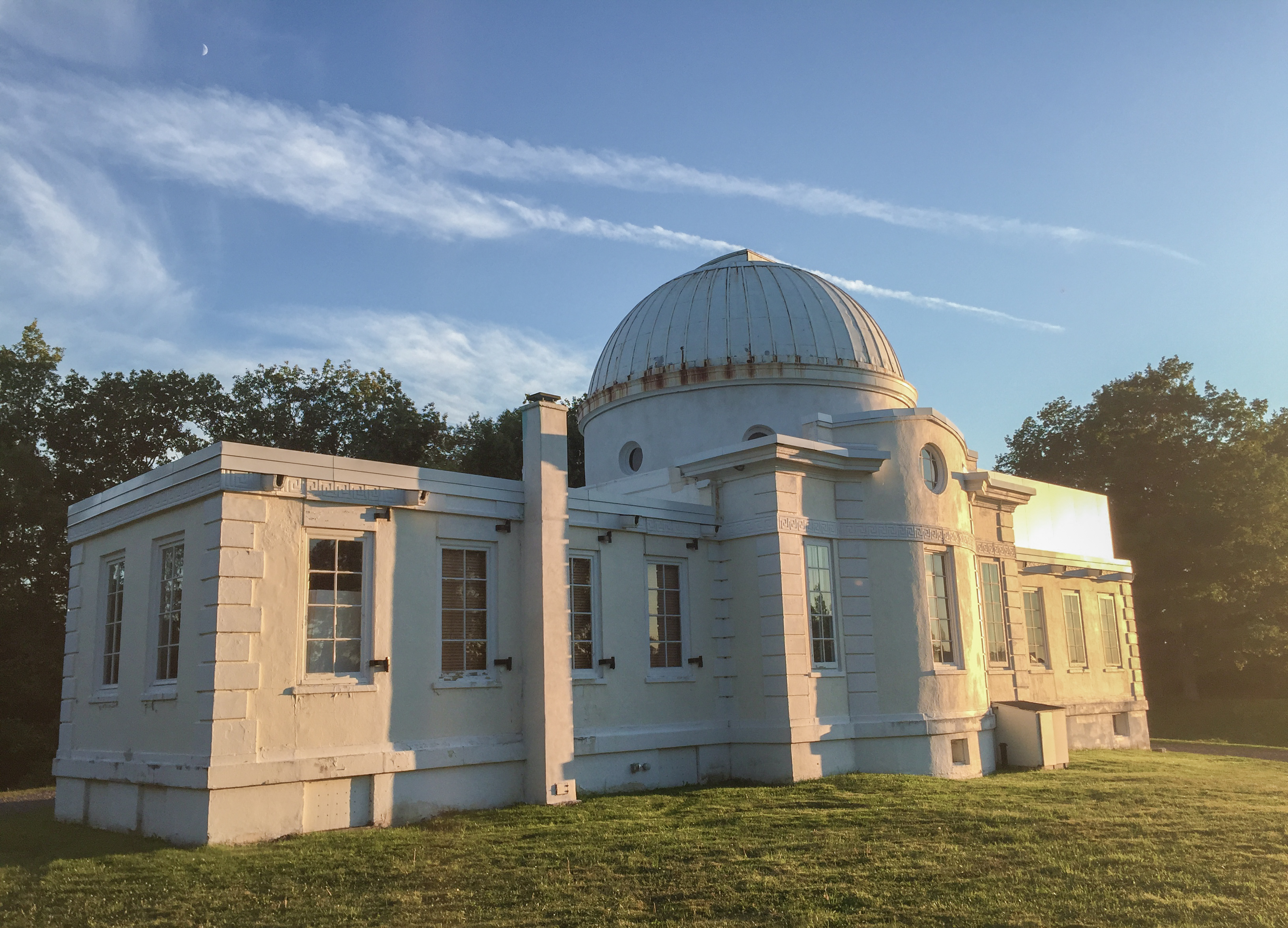
Fuertes Observatory on Cornell North Campus

Cornell's student governments—the Student Assembly and the Graduate and Professional Student Assembly—collectively allocate about $3.0 million annually to support clubs and organizations.

=== Greek life, professional, and honor societies ===
Cornell hosts a large fraternity and sorority system with about 70 chapters; roughly 33% of men and 24% of women participate. Zeta Psi was chartered during Cornell's first year. Alpha Phi Alpha, the first intercollegiate fraternity established for African Americans, was founded at Cornell in 1906. Alpha Zeta (1890) was the first Greek-letter organization founded in the U.S. for Latin Americans. La Unidad Latina, Lambda Upsilon Lambda (1982), later became the only Latino-based fraternity with chapters at all Ivy League institutions; Lambda Pi Chi (1988) was the first Latina-based (not Latina-exclusive) sorority founded at an Ivy League university.

Many Cornell chapters are among the oldest in their national organizations. The Alpha Delta Phi chapter house (1877) is believed to be the first U.S. building constructed solely for fraternity use; the chapter's current home was designed by John Russell Pope. The Greek system reports substantial annual community service and philanthropy; serious conduct matters are handled by the university's judicial processes.

=== Press and radio ===
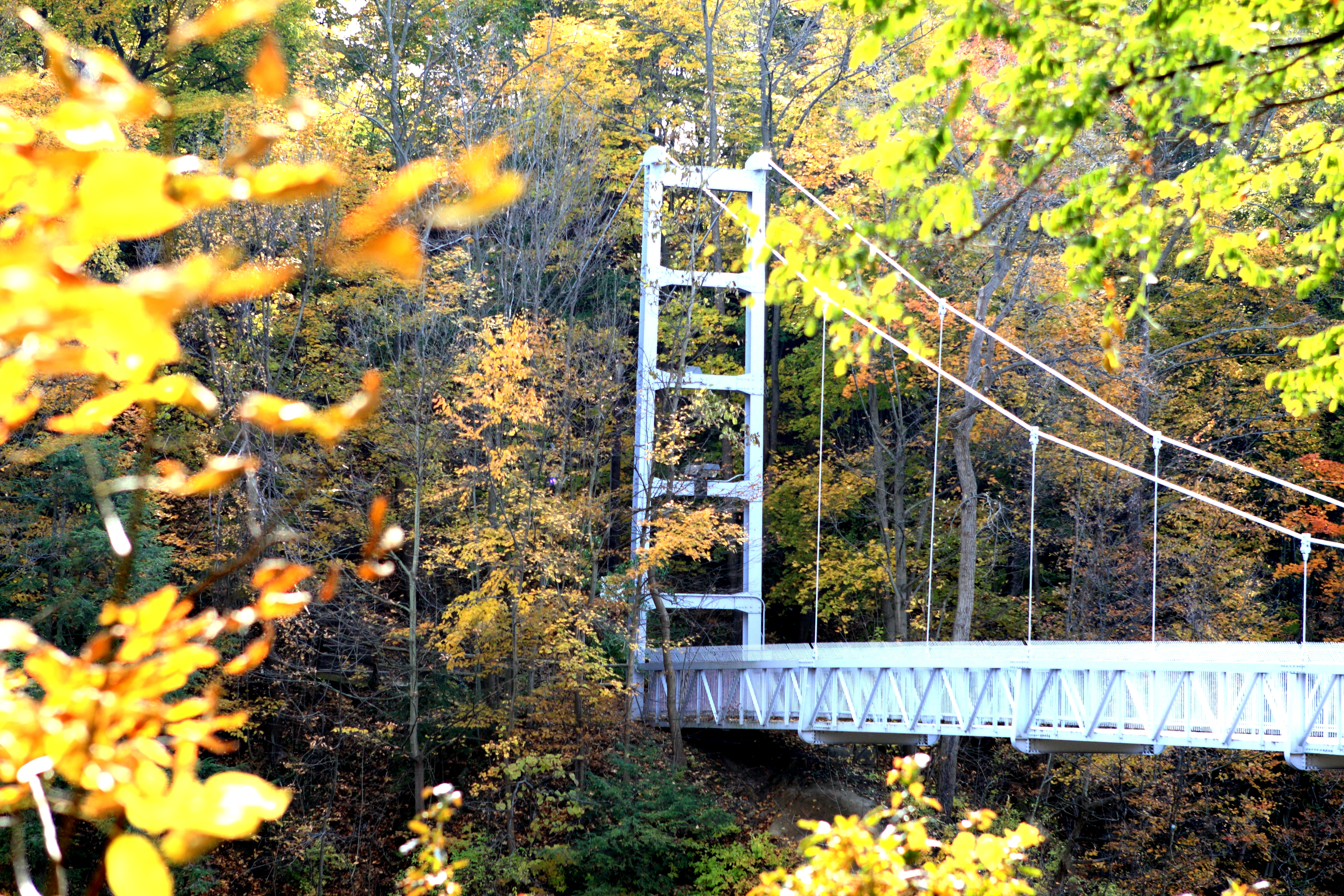
One of several footbridges that span Cornell's gorges

Student-run newspapers include The Cornell Daily Sun, an independent daily, and The Cornell Review, a conservative biweekly. Other outlets include The Cornell Lunatic (humor), the Cornell Chronicle (university paper of record), and Kitsch Magazine, co-published with Ithaca College. The Cornellian, an independent organization, publishes the yearbook, which has received the Silver Crown Award for Journalism and the Benjamin Franklin Award for Print Design. Students also operate WVBR-FM, an independent commercial FM station, and various internet streams.

=== Housing ===
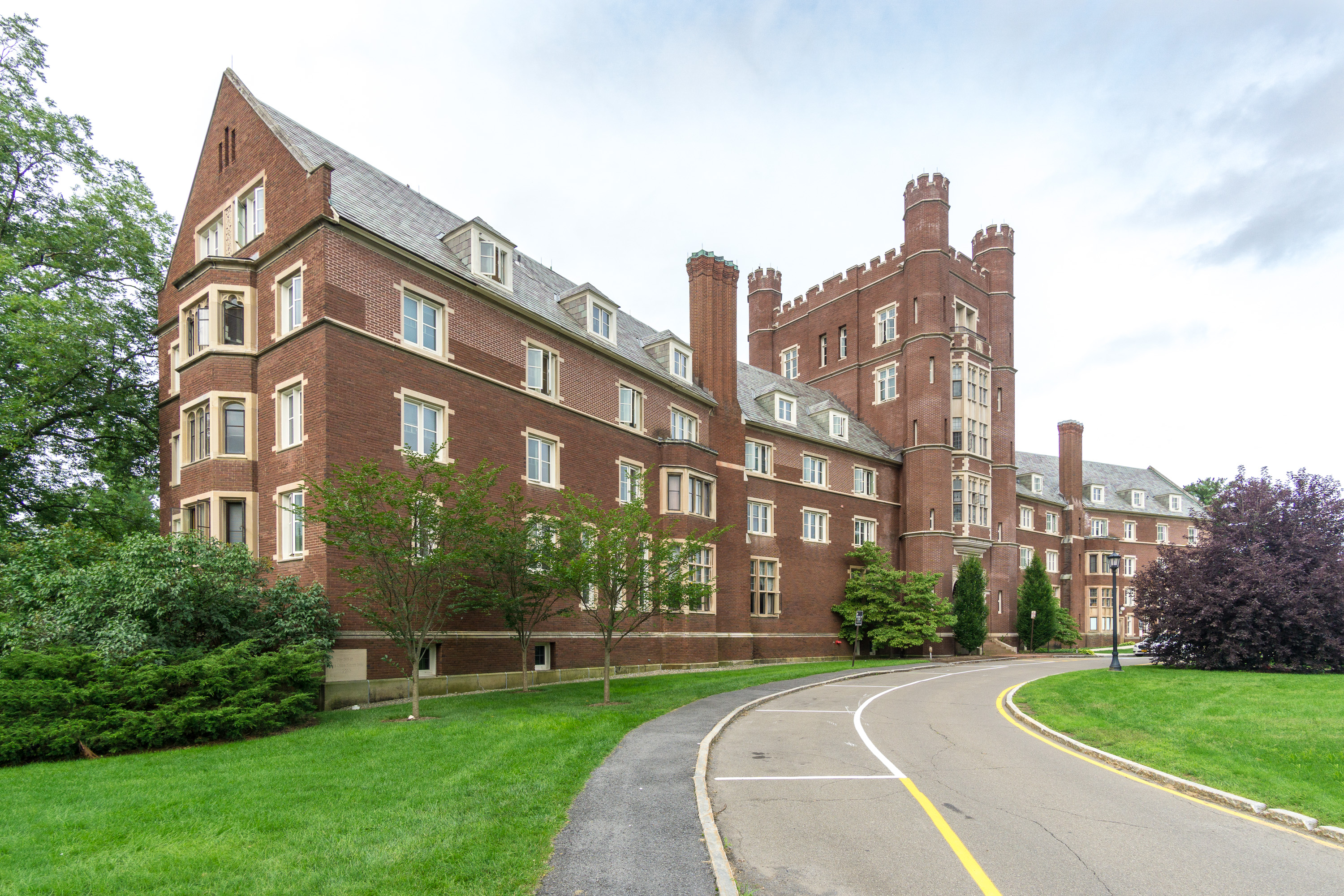
Risley Residential College on Cornell North Campus

Cornell's residential system comprises North Campus, West Campus, and Collegetown. Coeducational housing began in 1971, and the university maintains a system of residential advisors. A 1997 initiative designated West Campus primarily for upper-level students and North Campus for first-years and some sophomores. In 2022, the North Campus Residential Expansion added beds for about 800 sophomores.

West Campus incorporates a residential college system developed through a $250 million project, influenced in part by Risley Residential College. Other options include Schuyler House (a former part of Sage Infirmary).

Various Cornell housing facilities

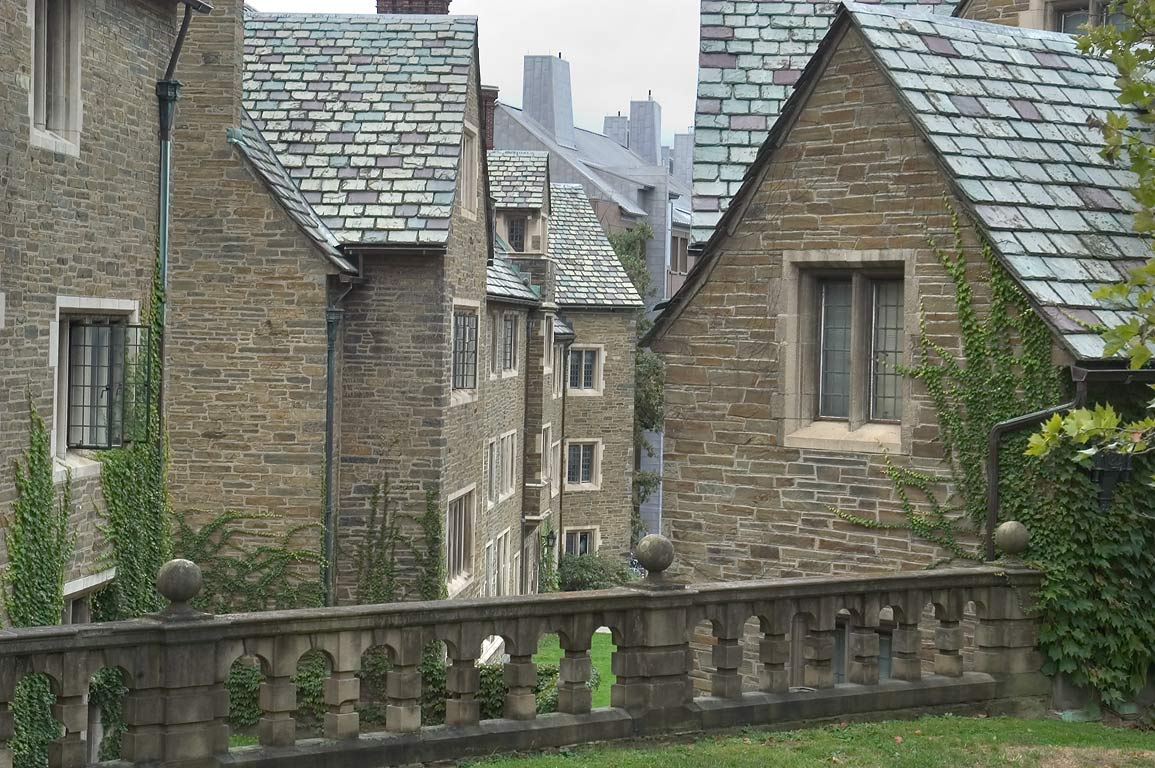
Baker Dormitories

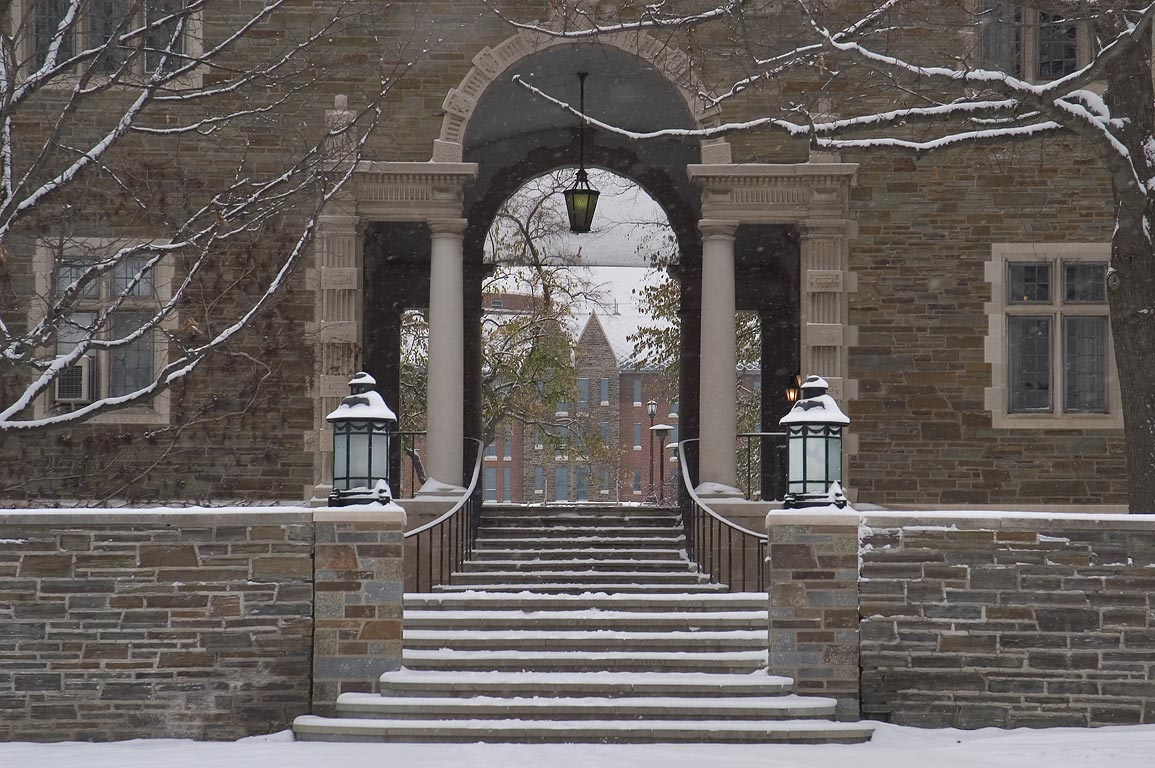
Balch Hall

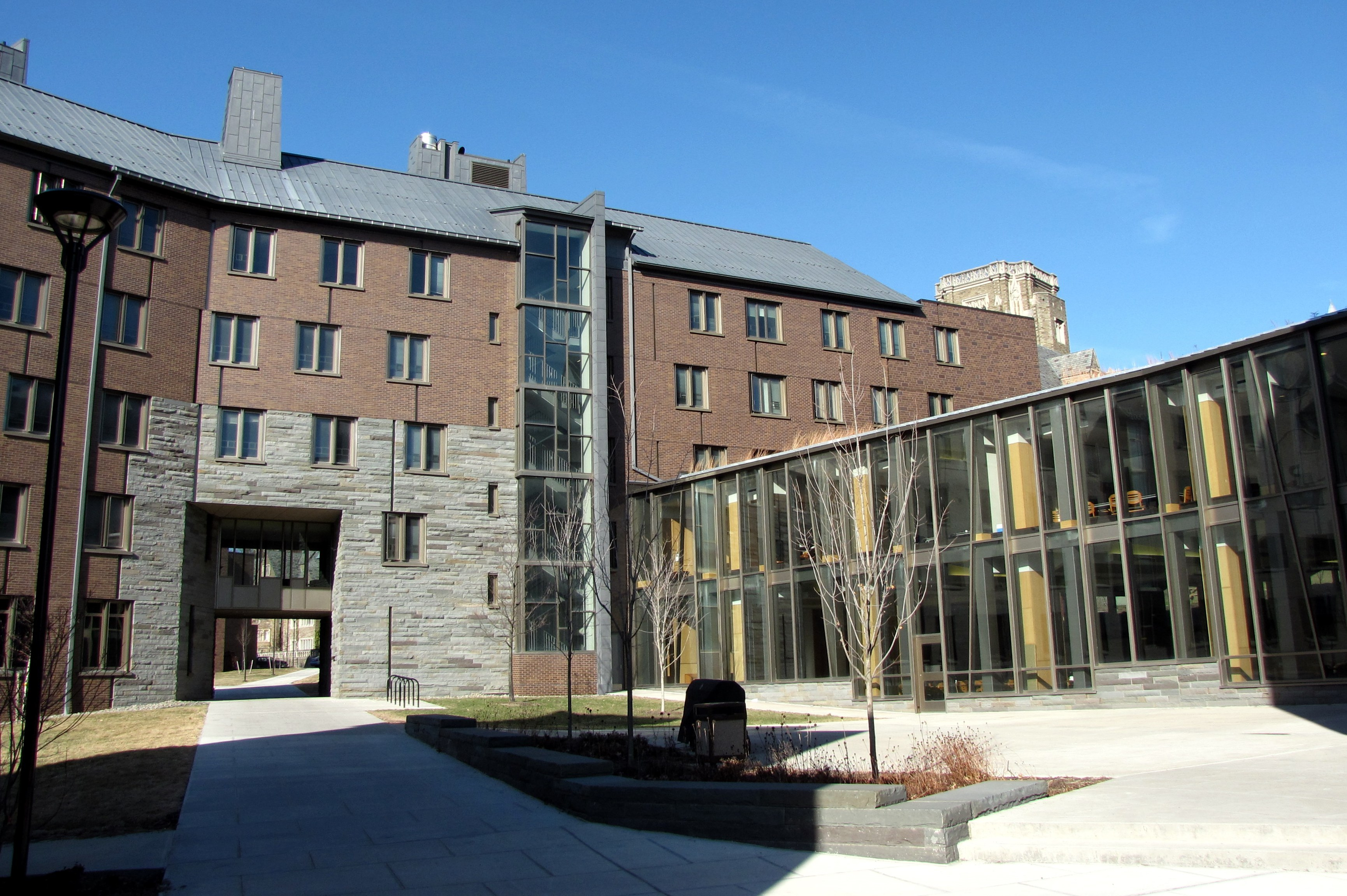
Hans Bethe House

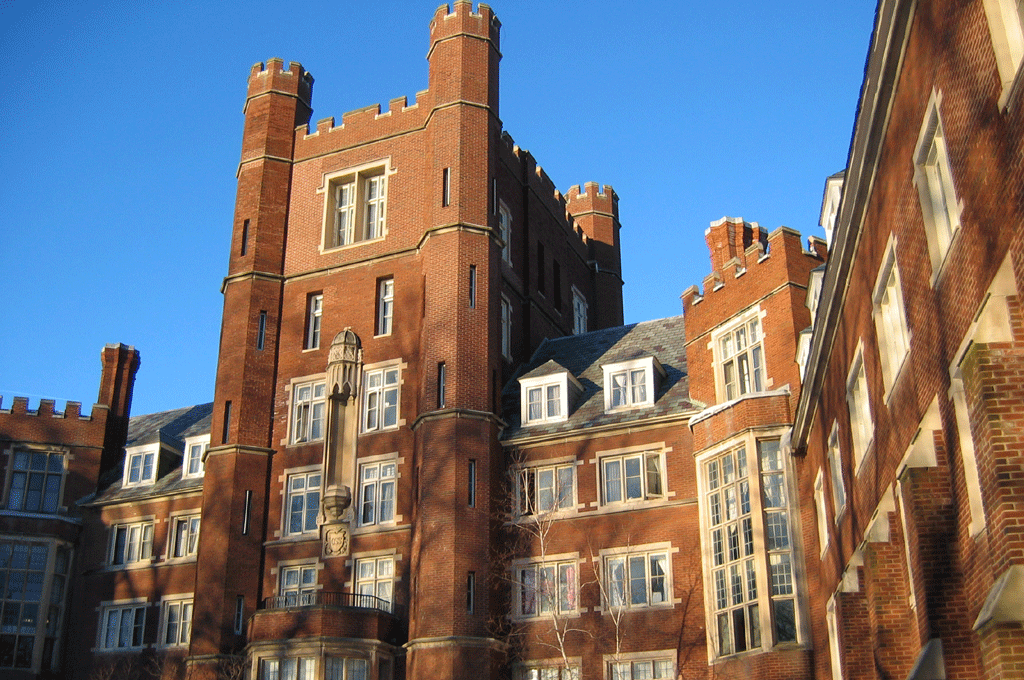
Risley Hall

=== Dining ===
As of 2025, The Princeton Review ranked Cornell's dining program fifth in the nation. The university operates 29 dining facilities across campus. On North Campus, Morrison Dining and North Star Dining at Appel Commons serve as primary venues for first-year students. Risley Residential College includes a historic dining hall modeled on the great hall at Christ Church, Oxford.

=== Athletics ===
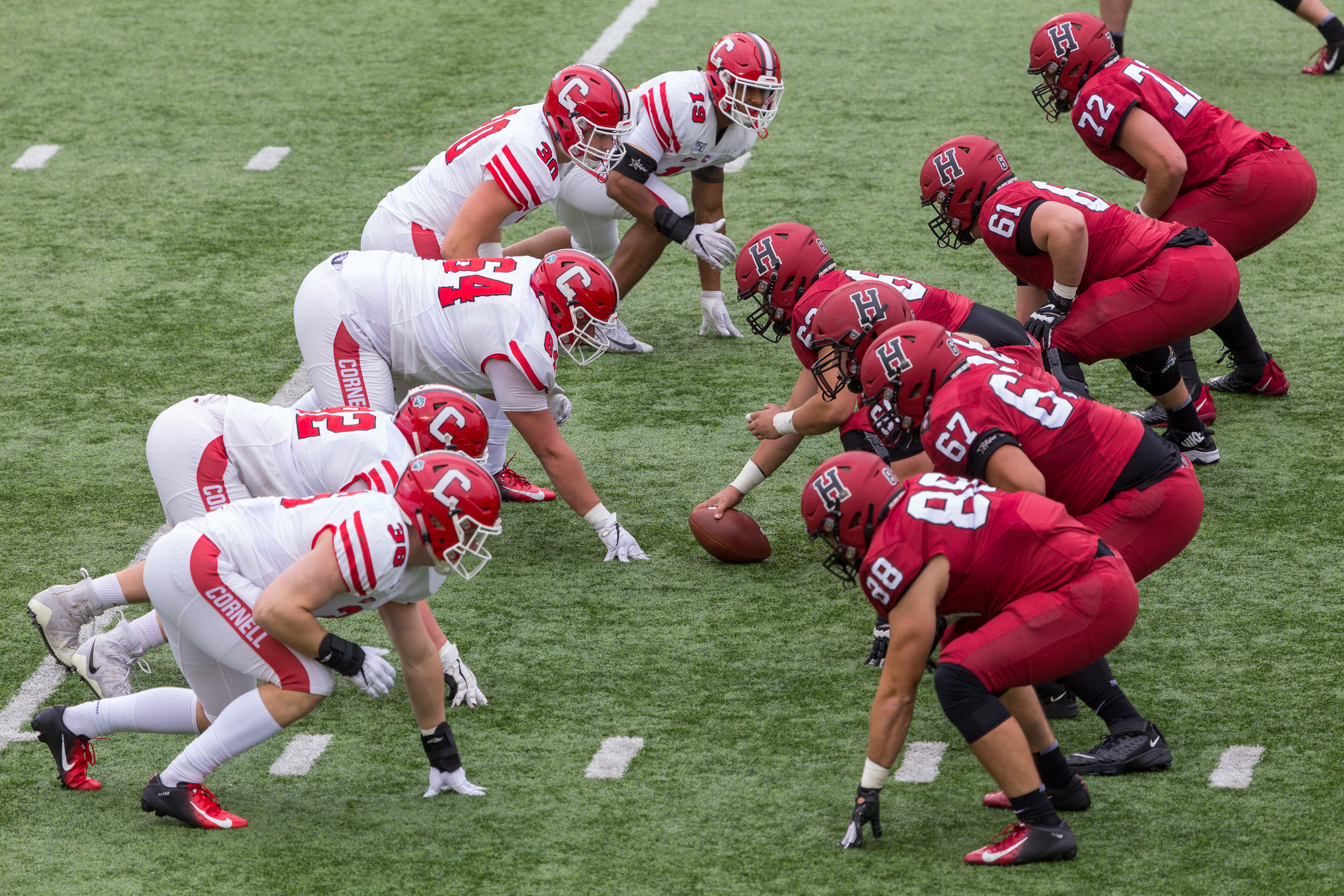
Cornell football vs. Harvard at Harvard Stadium in October 2019

Cornell's 35 varsity intercollegiate teams compete in NCAA Division I as the Cornell Big Red, primarily in the Ivy League and the Eastern College Athletic Conference (ECAC). Teams frequently contend nationally in men's wrestling, men's lacrosse, men's ice hockey, and rowing. As an Ivy member, Cornell does not award athletic scholarships.

Football claimed at least a share of the national championship four times before 1940 and has won three Ivy titles, most recently in 1990. In 2010, men's basketball reached the NCAA “Sweet 16,” the first Ivy team to do so since 1979.

=== Cornell Outdoor Education ===
Cornell runs one of the largest collegiate outdoor education programs in the U.S., serving over 20,000 people annually with more than 130 courses (e.g., backpacking, caving, climbing, sailing). COE also runs the student-led pre-orientation program Outdoor Odyssey. Most COE classes are taught by paid student instructors and count toward the physical education requirement. The Lindseth Climbing Wall was renovated in 2016 to 8,000 sq ft of climbing surface (from 4,800 sq ft).

=== Cornelliana ===
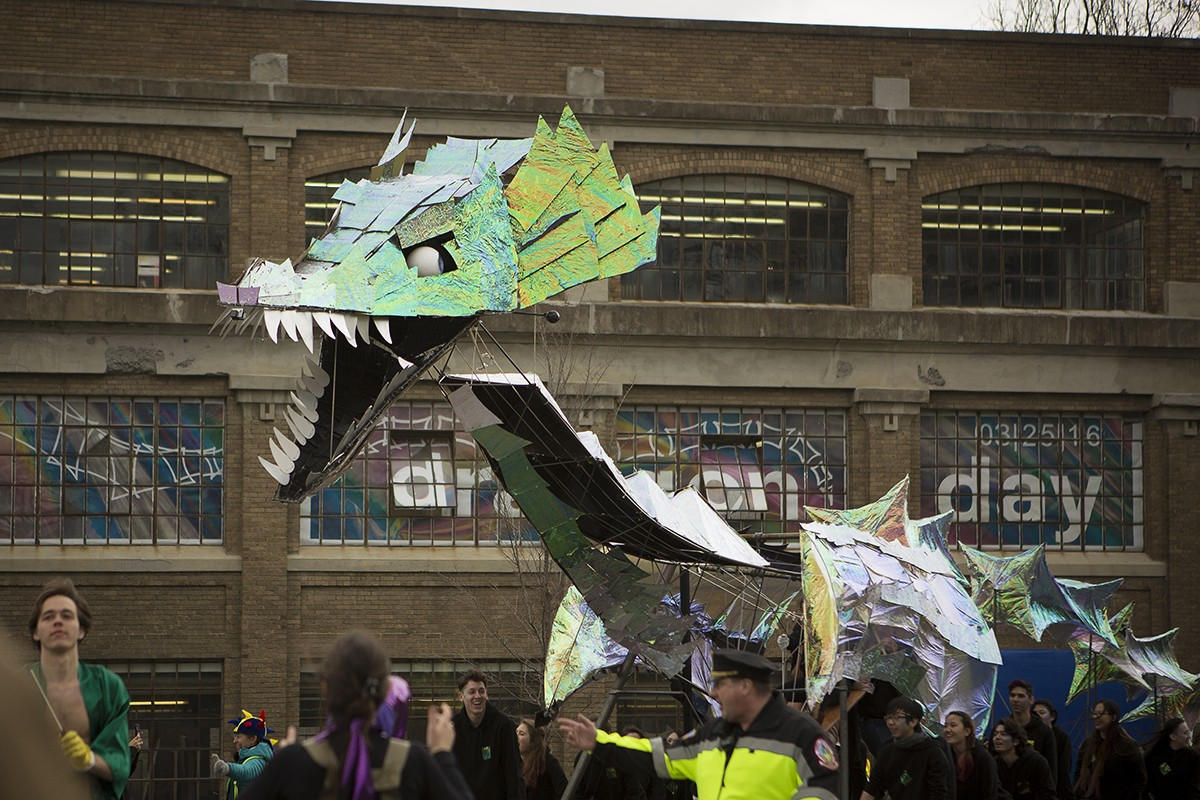
Dragon Day (founded 1901) features a student-built dragon paraded through campus by first-year architecture students.

Cornelliana refers to Cornell traditions, legends, and lore. Traditions include Slope Day and Dragon Day, one of the oldest campus events (founded 1901 and usually held near St. Patrick's Day). First-year architecture students build and parade a dragon around central campus, followed by upper-class architecture students in costume; the historic bonfire has been discontinued due to environmental regulations.

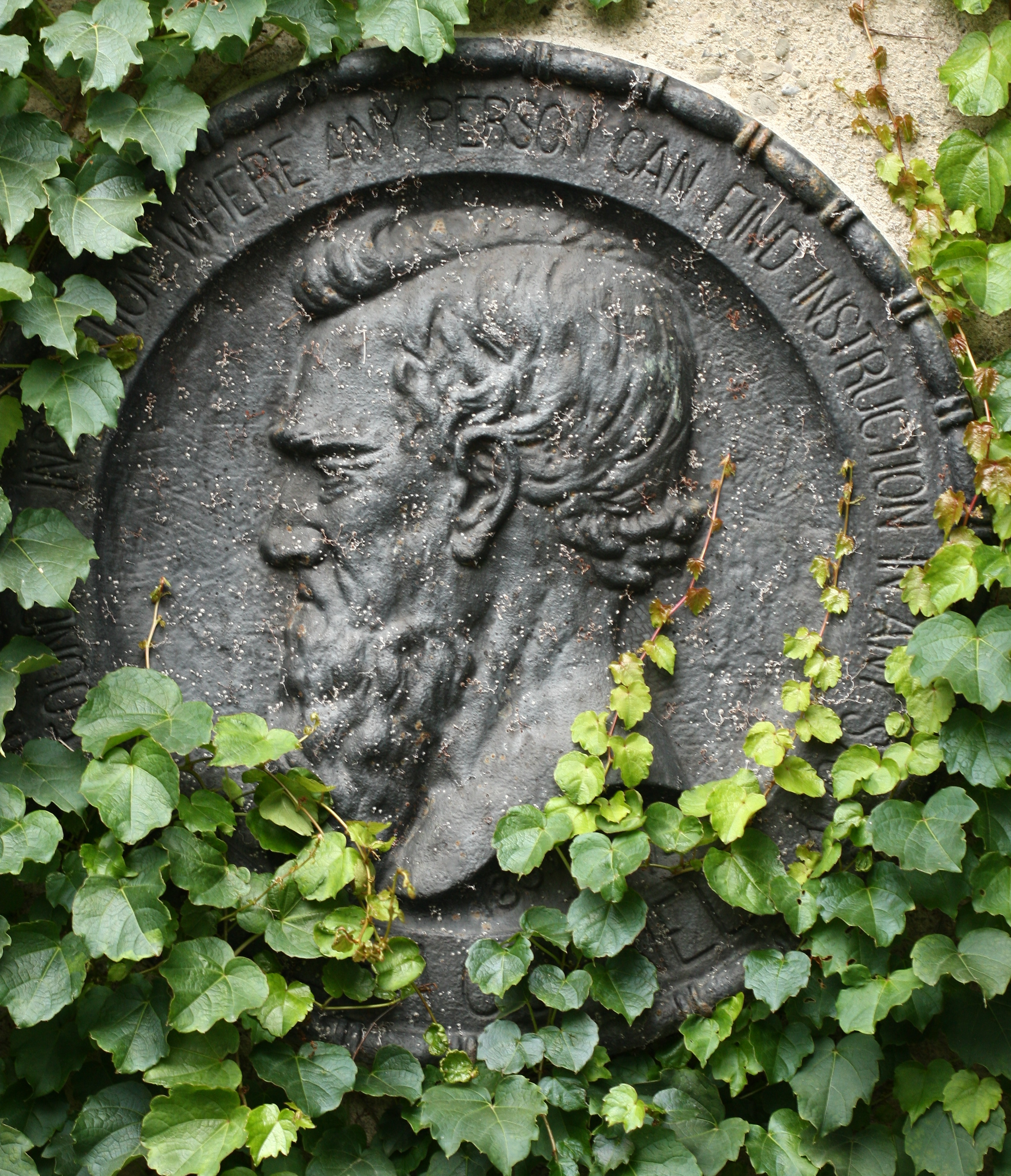
The ivy-covered emblem of Ezra Cornell and university motto

Campus lore includes myths about statues on the Arts Quad and a “kissing bridge” on North Campus. Notable pranks include a 60-pound pumpkin and a disco ball mysteriously placed atop the 173-foot McGraw Tower spire; the tower is lit seasonally and plays music.

School colors are carnelian and white; the unofficial mascot is a bear, dating to the live bear “Touchdown” introduced in 1915. The alma mater is “Far Above Cayuga’s Waters,” and the fight song is “Give My Regards to Davy.” Students and alumni are “Cornellians.”

=== Health ===
Cornell provides professional and peer counseling services, and on-campus outpatient care through Cornell Health (formerly Gannett Health Services), with emergency and residential services provided by Cayuga Medical Center. Historically, Cornell maintained residential infirmary care, including at the former Sage Infirmary. Cornell offers reproductive health and family-planning services and operates a student-run Emergency Medical Service (CUEMS) that responds on campus and provides training.

In 2009–10, six student deaths by gorge jumping drew national attention. Temporary bridge fences were followed by installation of means-restriction nets on five bridges in 2013. Prior to that cluster, Cornell's suicide rate had been similar to or below that of peer U.S. universities, including 2005–2008 when no suicides occurred.

=== Campus police ===
Cornell University Police are New York State peace officers with authority equivalent to municipal police in Ithaca. They provide 24/7 patrols, emergency response, crime prevention, investigations, and enforcement of state laws and campus regulations.

== People ==
=== Alumni ===
Notable Cornell alumni include:

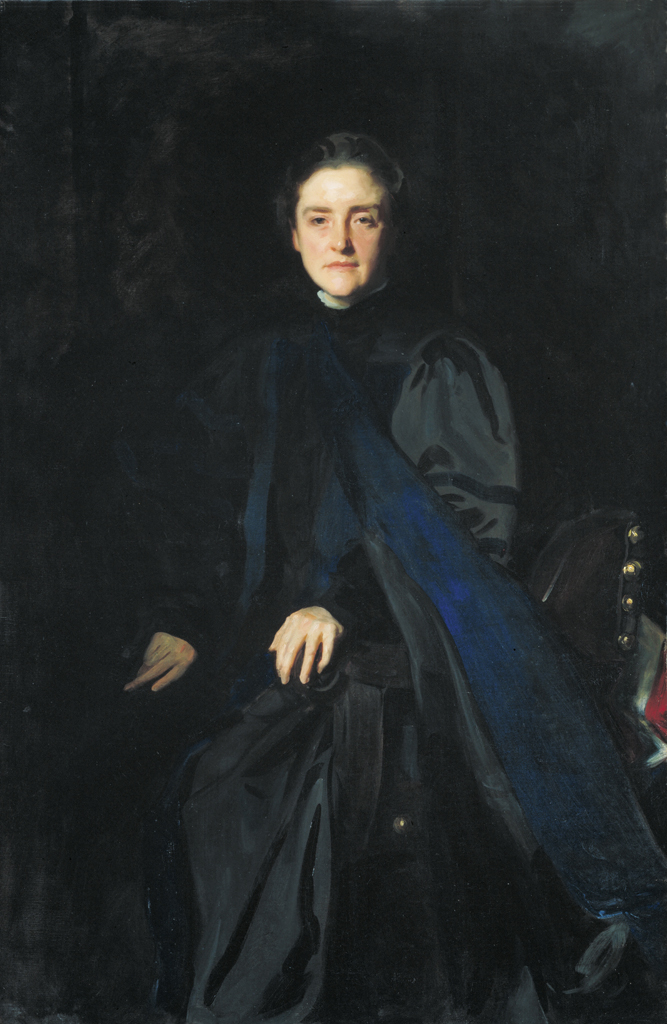
M. Carey Thomas (B.A. 1877)

Hu Shih (B.A. 1914)

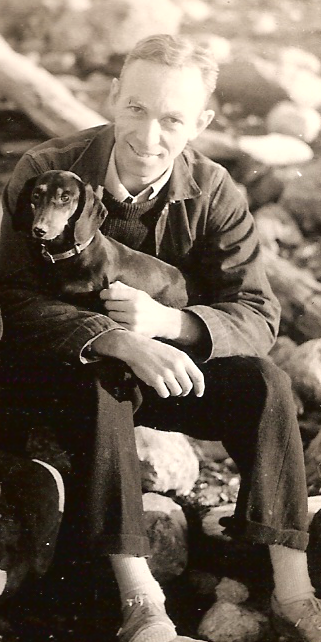
E. B. White (B.A. 1921)

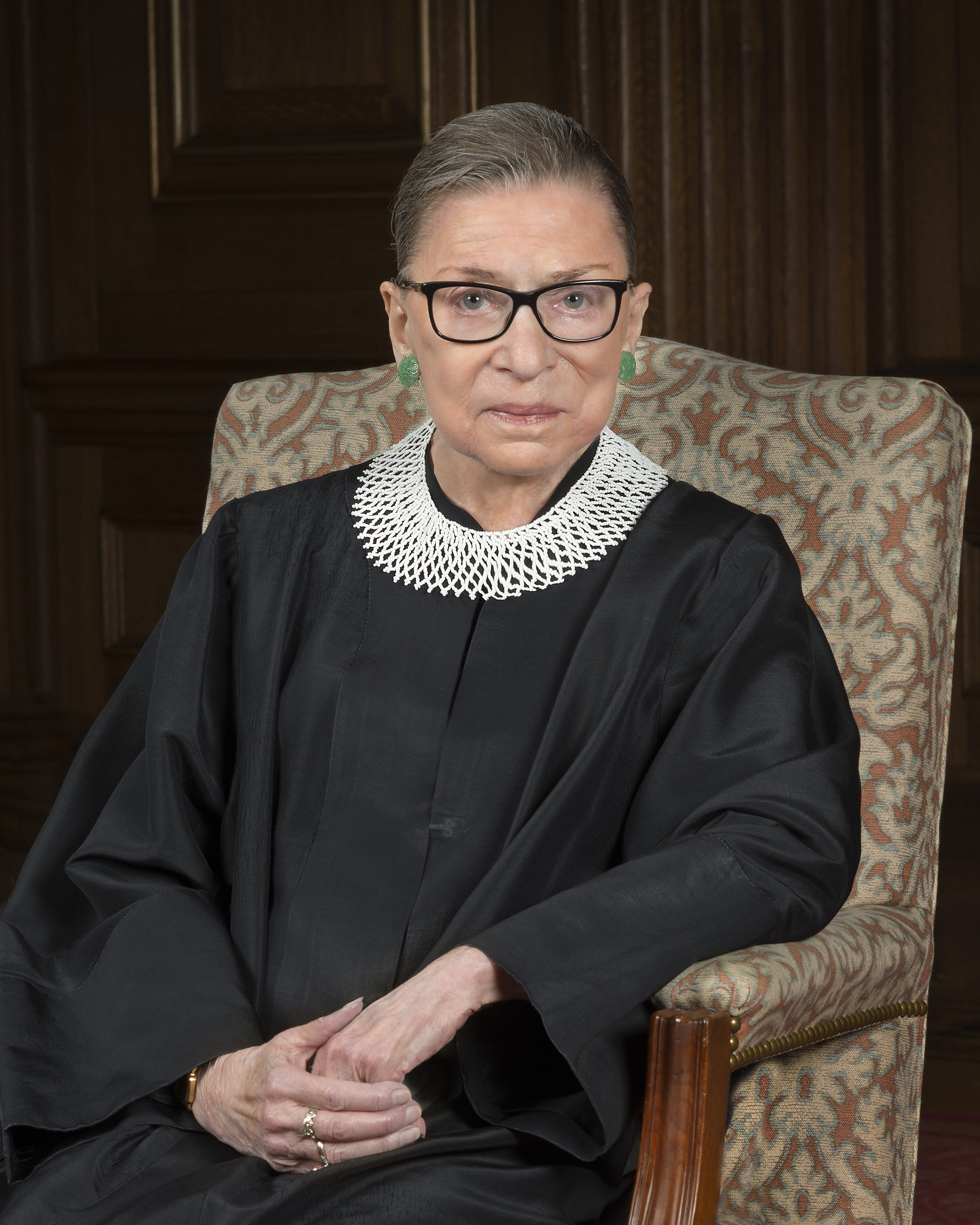
Ruth Bader Ginsburg (B.A. 1954)

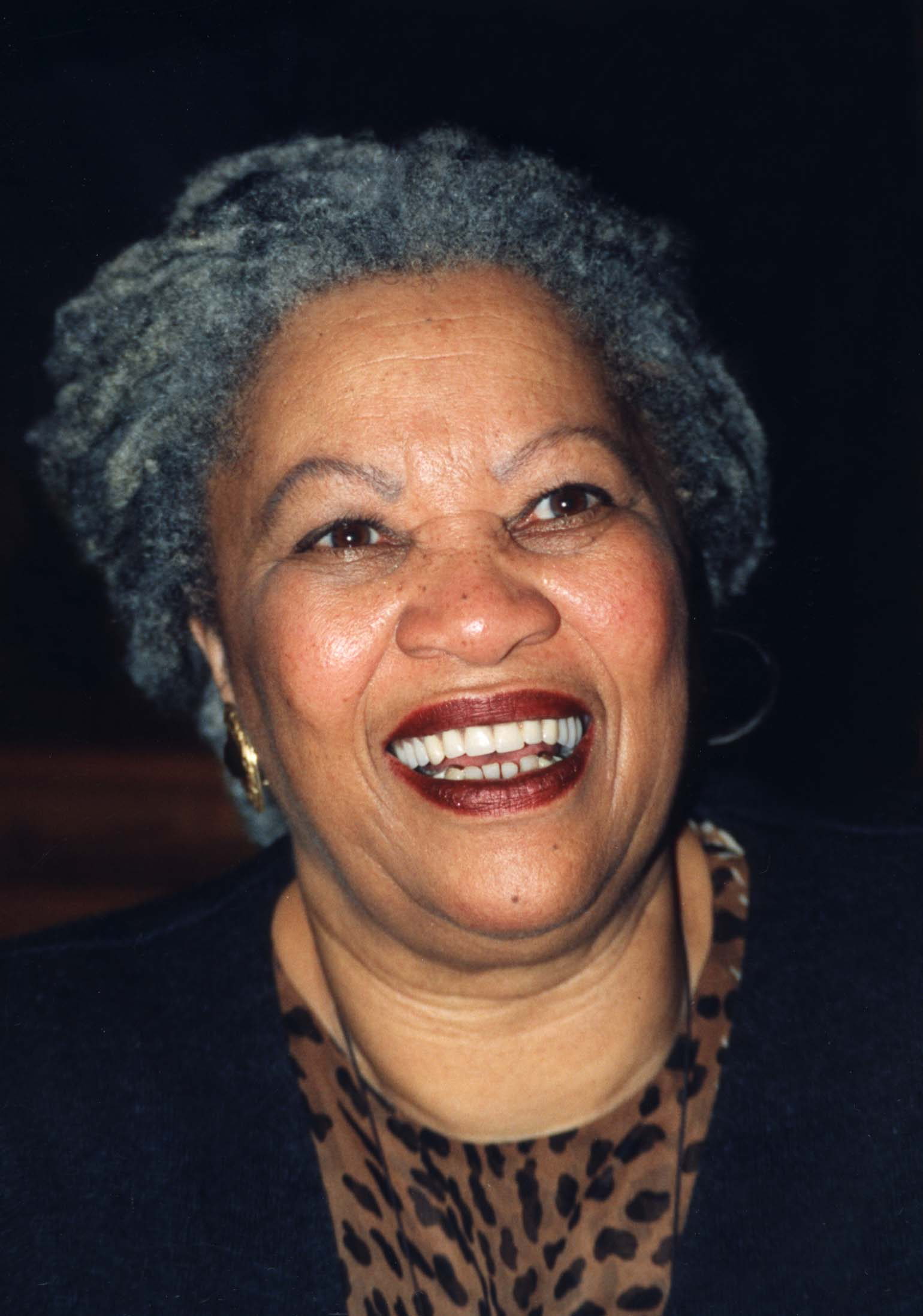
Toni Morrison (M.A. 1955)

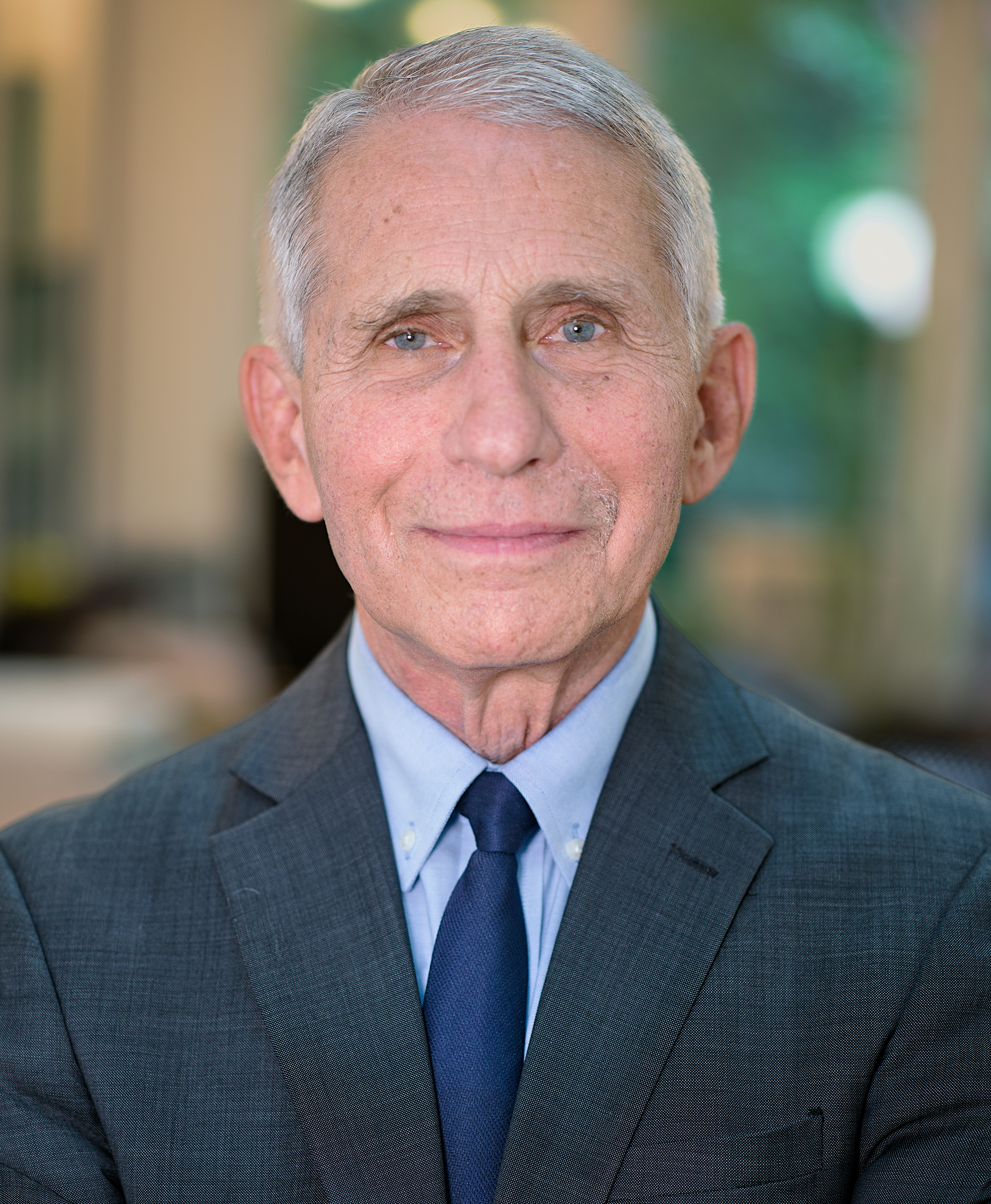
Anthony Fauci (M.D. 1966)

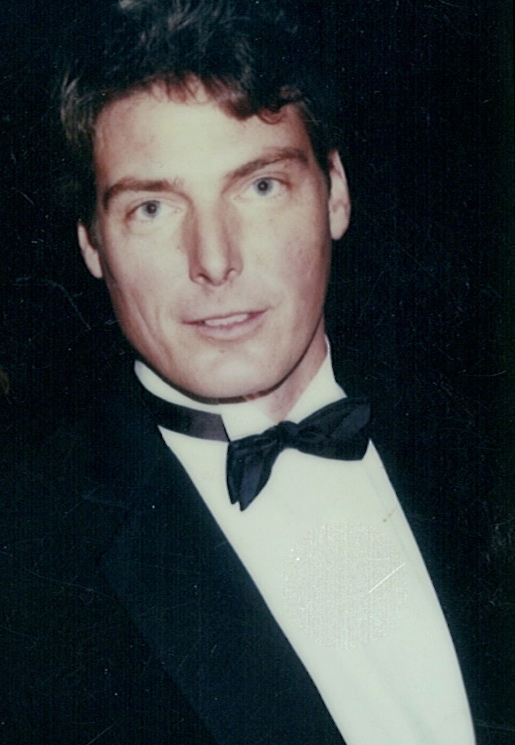
Christopher Reeve (B.A. 1974)

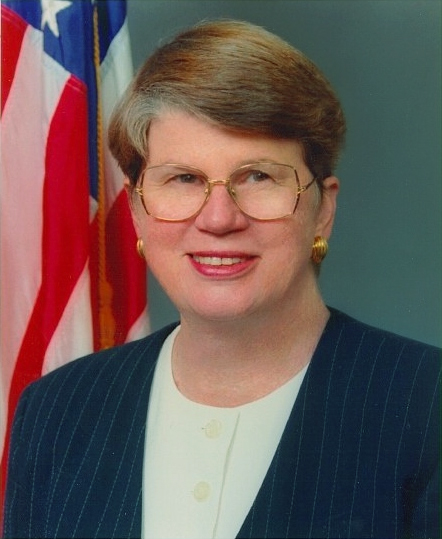
Janet Reno (B.A. 1960)

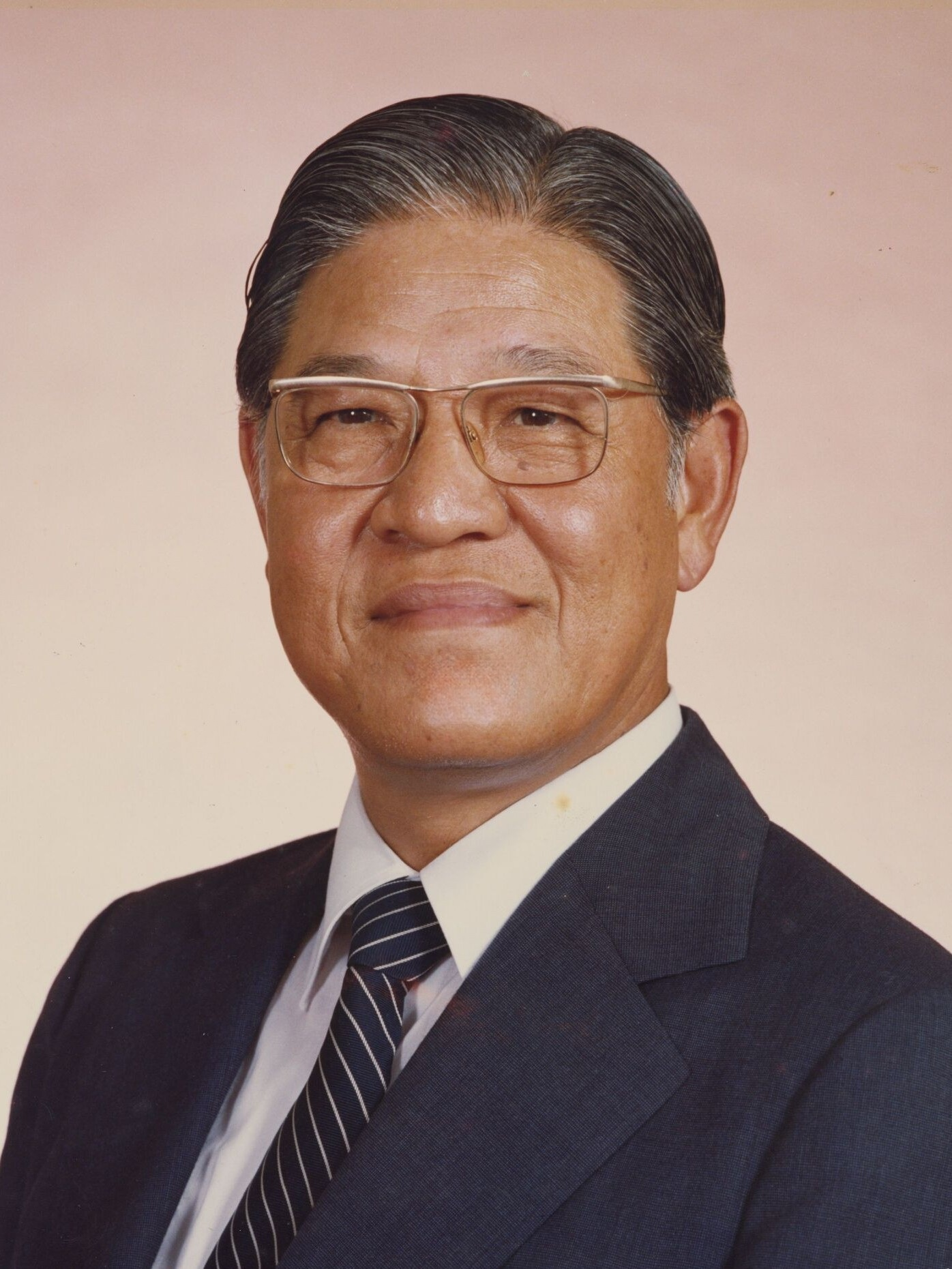
Lee Teng-hui (Ph.D. 1968)

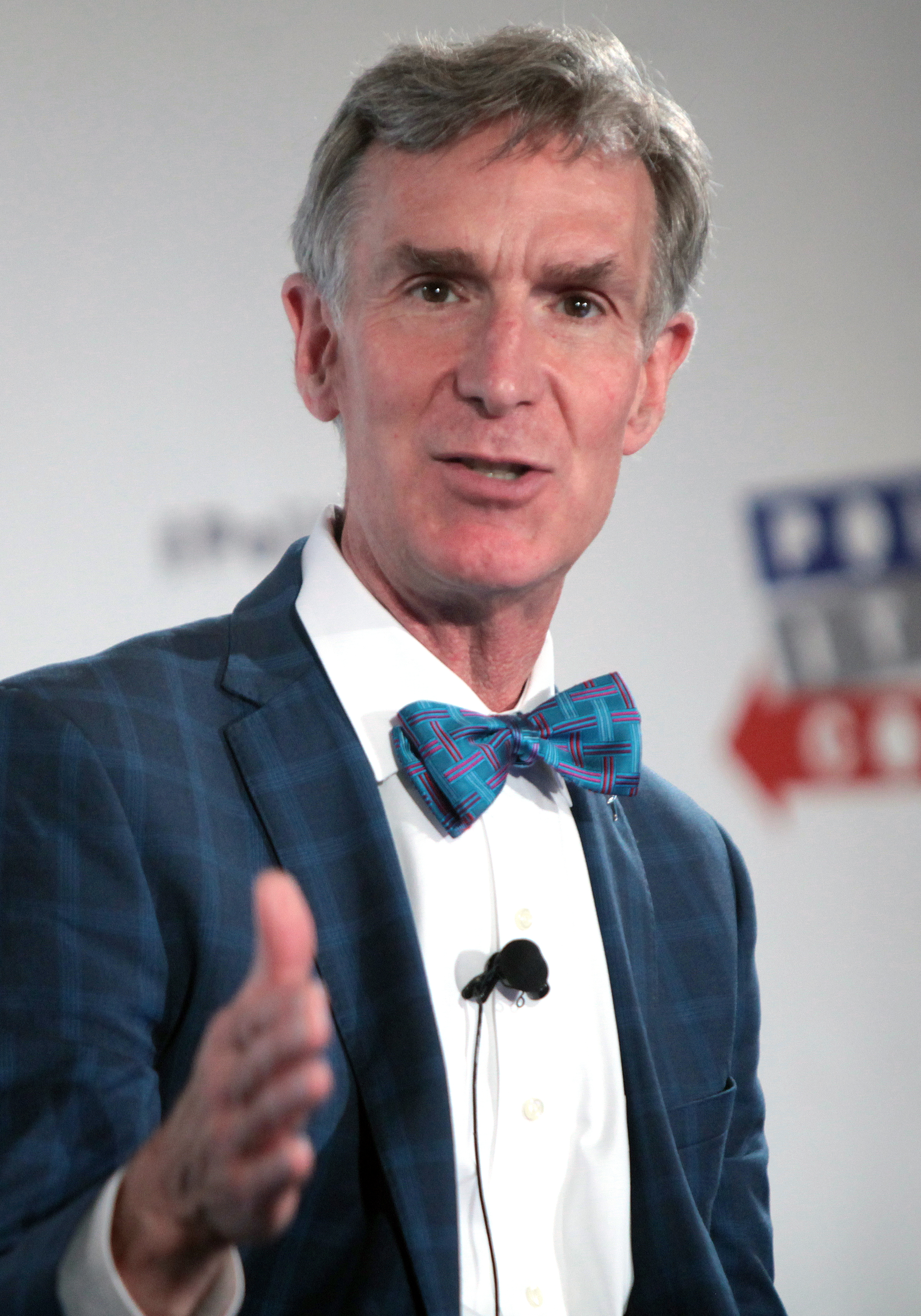
Bill Nye (B.S. 1977)

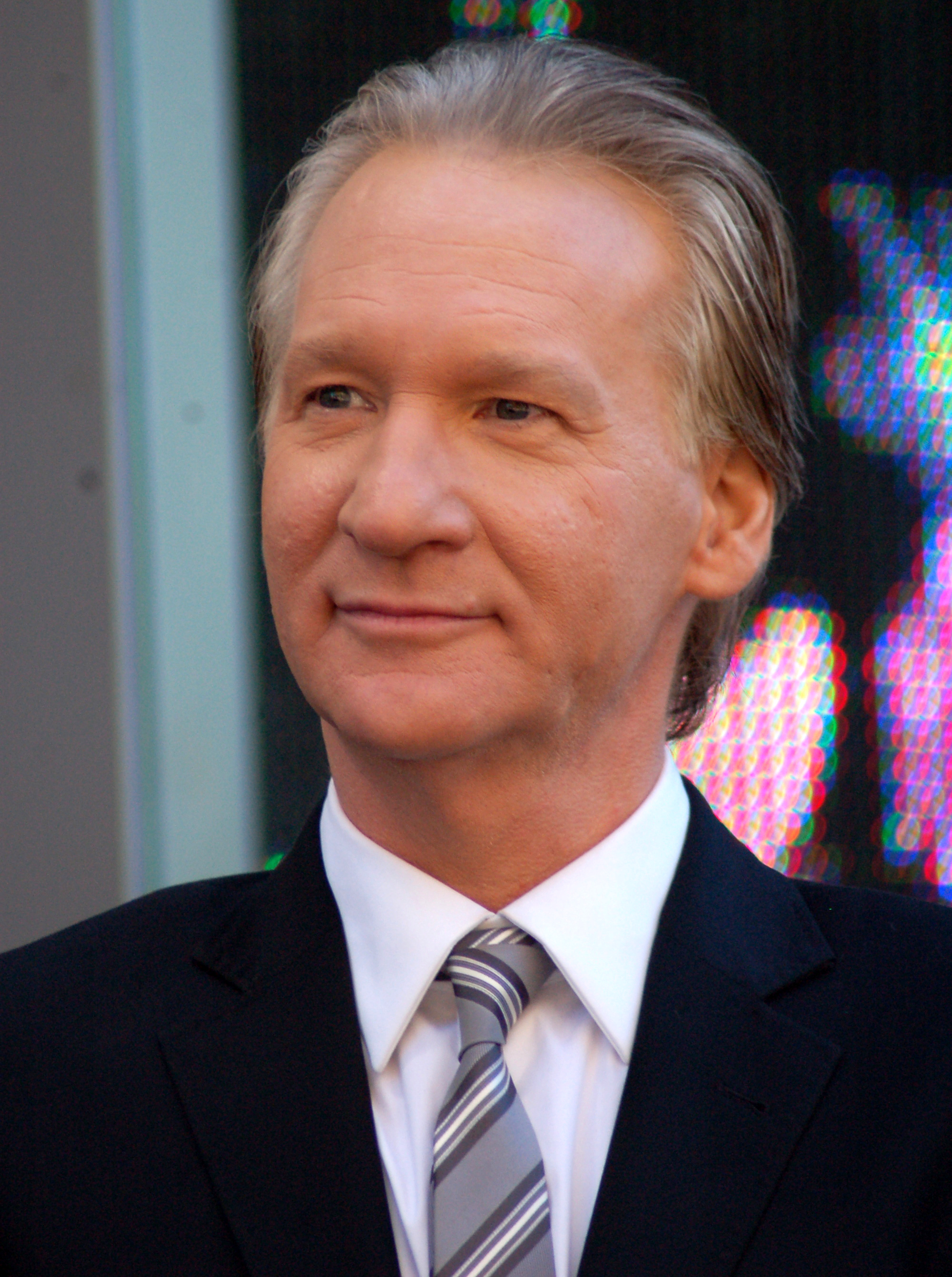
Bill Maher (B.A. 1978)

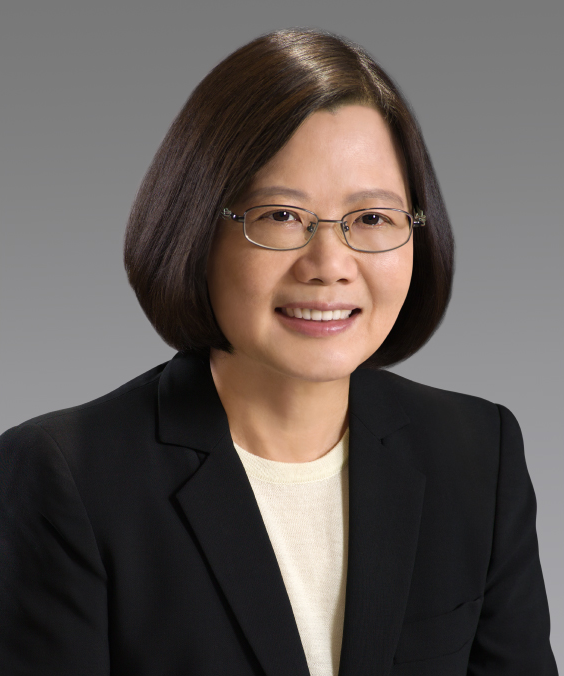
Tsai Ing-wen (LL.M. 1980)

Mae Jemison (M.D. 1981)

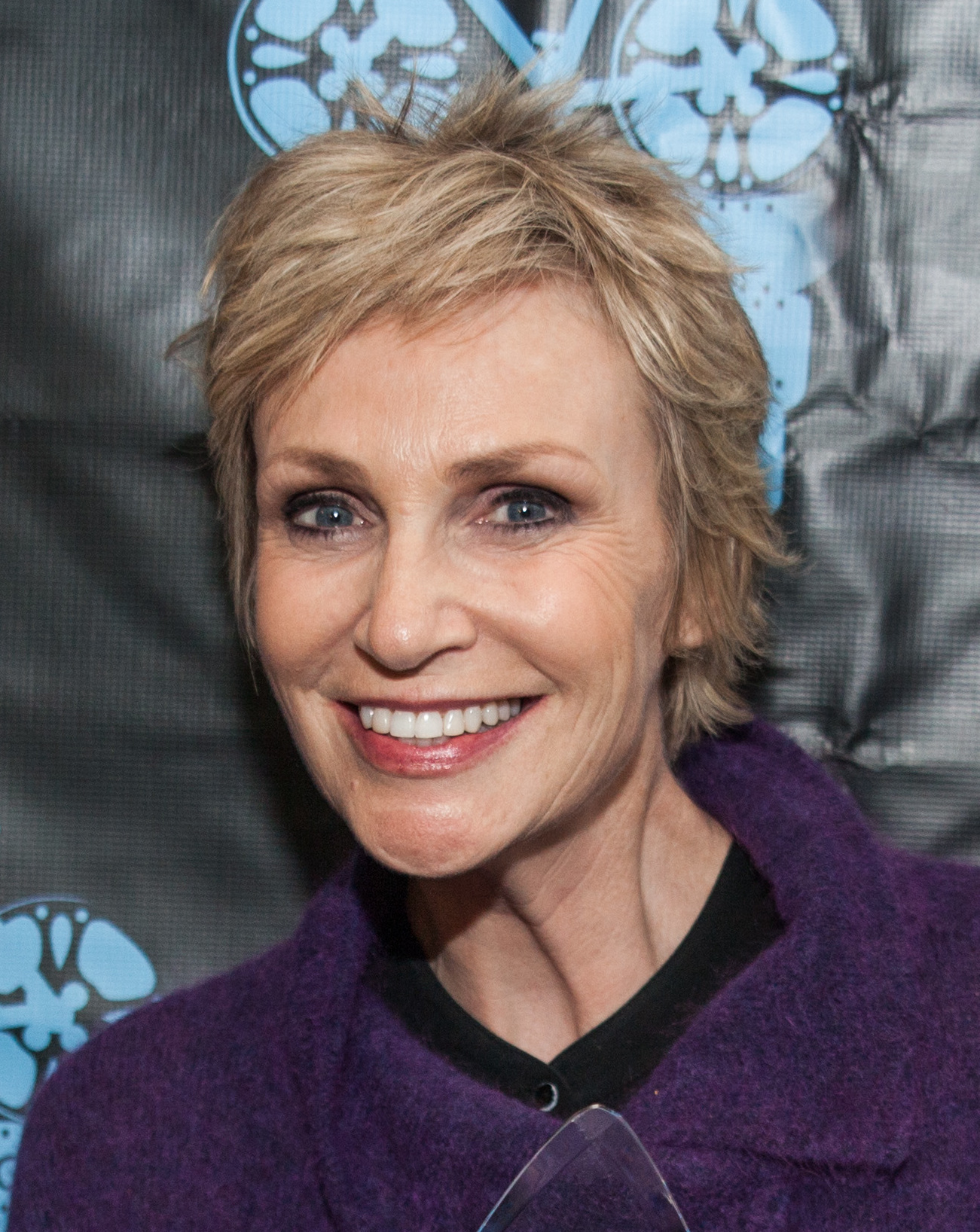
Jane Lynch (M.F.A. 1984)

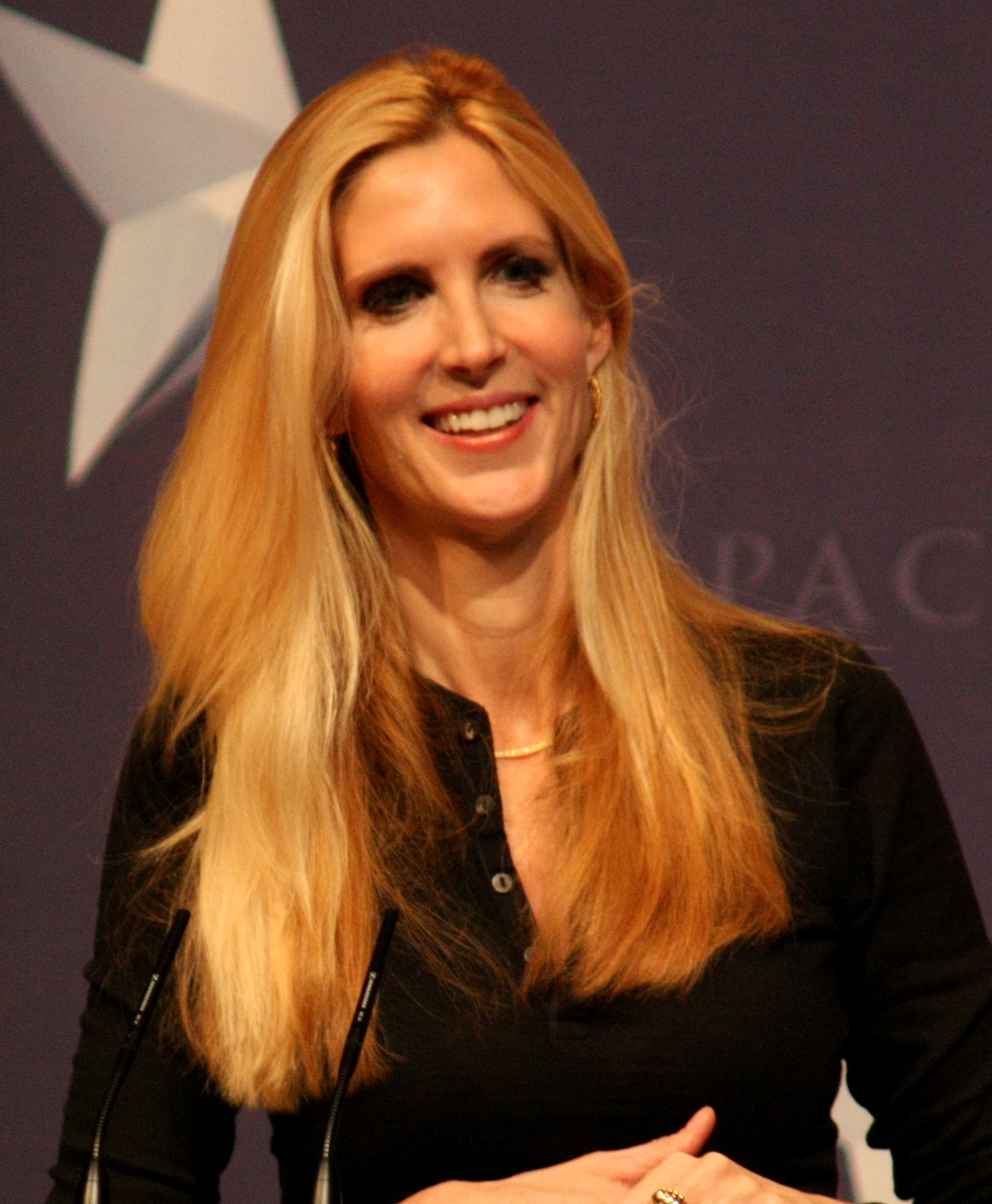
Ann Coulter (B.A. 1984)

As of 2024, Cornell had more than 250,000 living alumni, including 34 Marshall Scholars and 31 Rhodes Scholars. Cornell is the only institution with four female alumni—Pearl S. Buck, Barbara McClintock, Toni Morrison, and Claudia Goldin—who have won unshared Nobel Prizes. Alumni maintain ties through homecoming, Cornell Magazine, and the Cornell Club of New York. In 2015, Cornell ranked fifth among U.S. institutions for alumni gifts and bequests.

Representative alumni across fields include heads of state Lee Teng-hui, Tsai Ing-wen, Mario García Menocal, and Jamshid Amuzegar; U.S. officials Janet Reno and Ruth Bader Ginsburg; inventors Willis Carrier and Robert Moog; authors Thomas Pynchon and E. B. White; entertainers Bill Nye and Christopher Reeve; and sportspeople Pop Warner and Ken Dryden.

=== Faculty ===
Notable current and former Cornell faculty include:

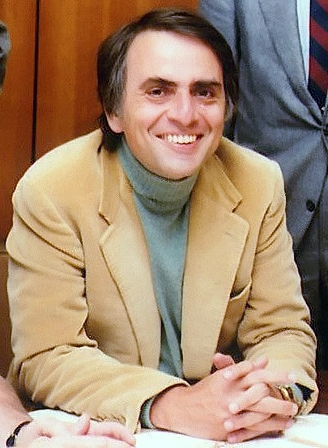
Carl Sagan

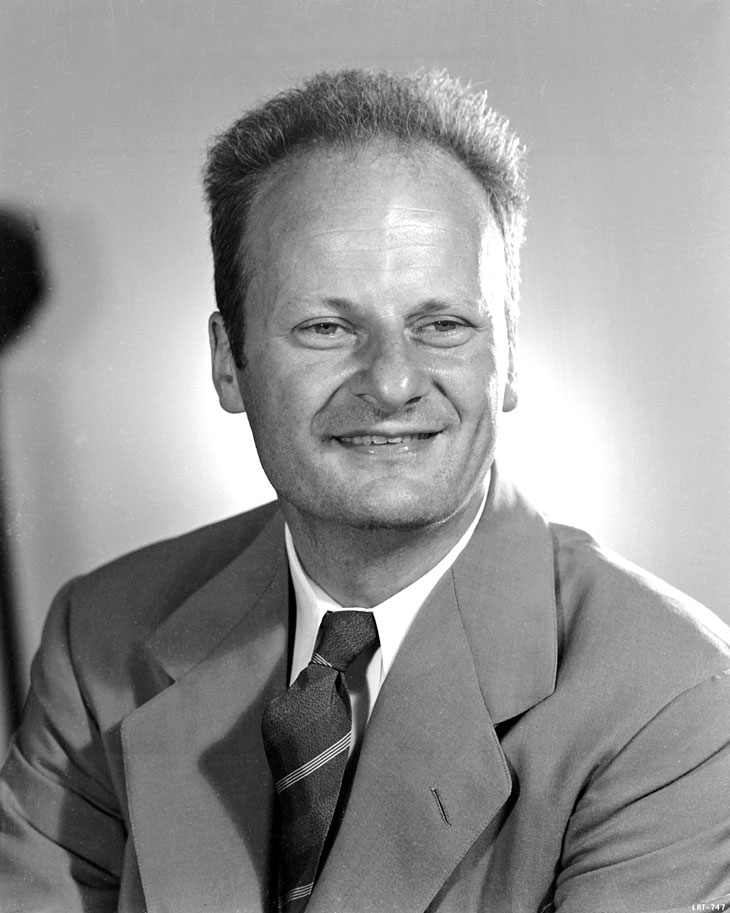
Hans Bethe

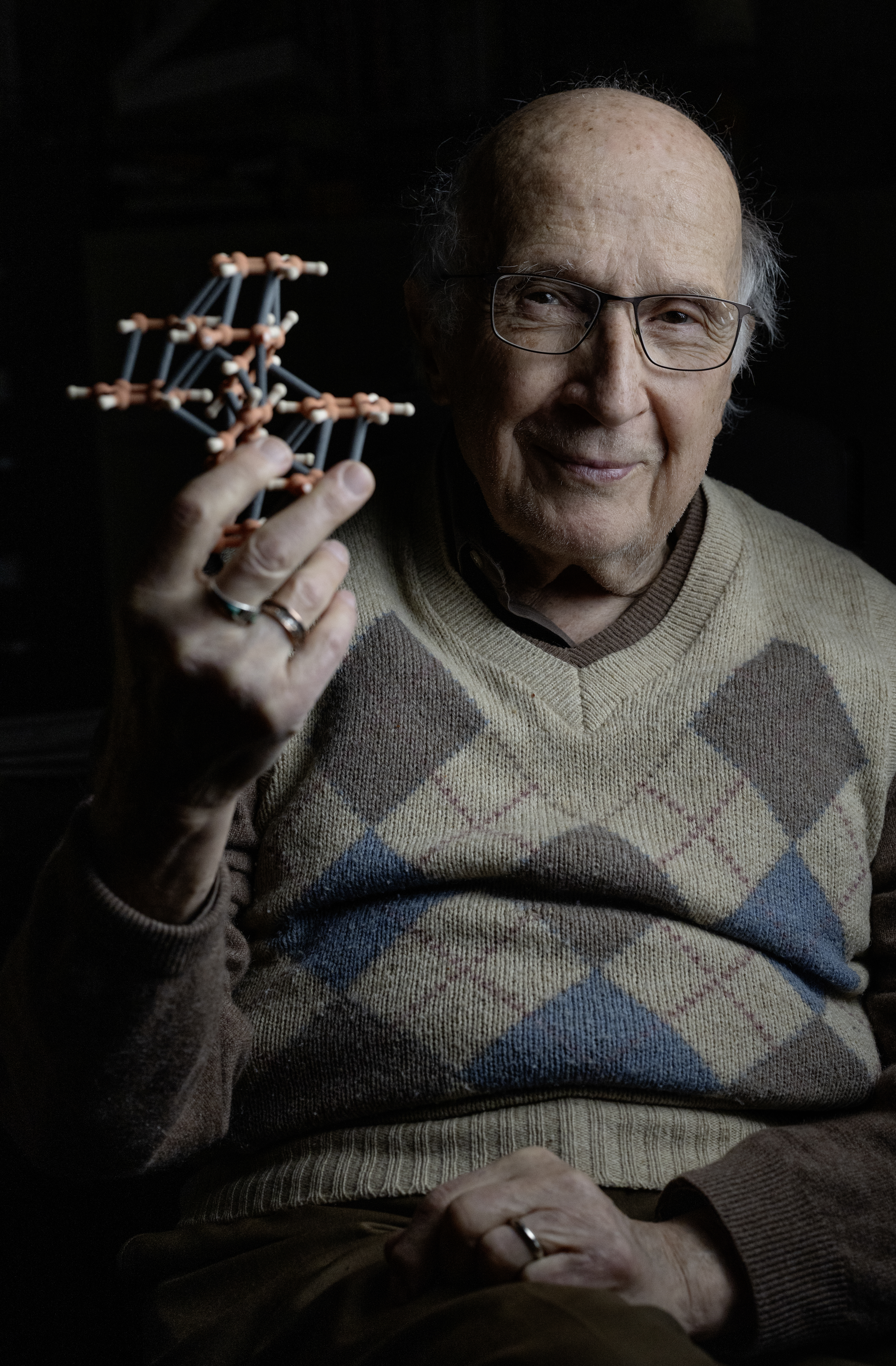
Roald Hoffmann

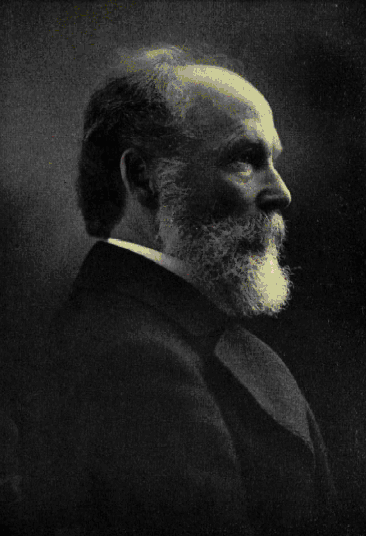
Moses Coit Tyler

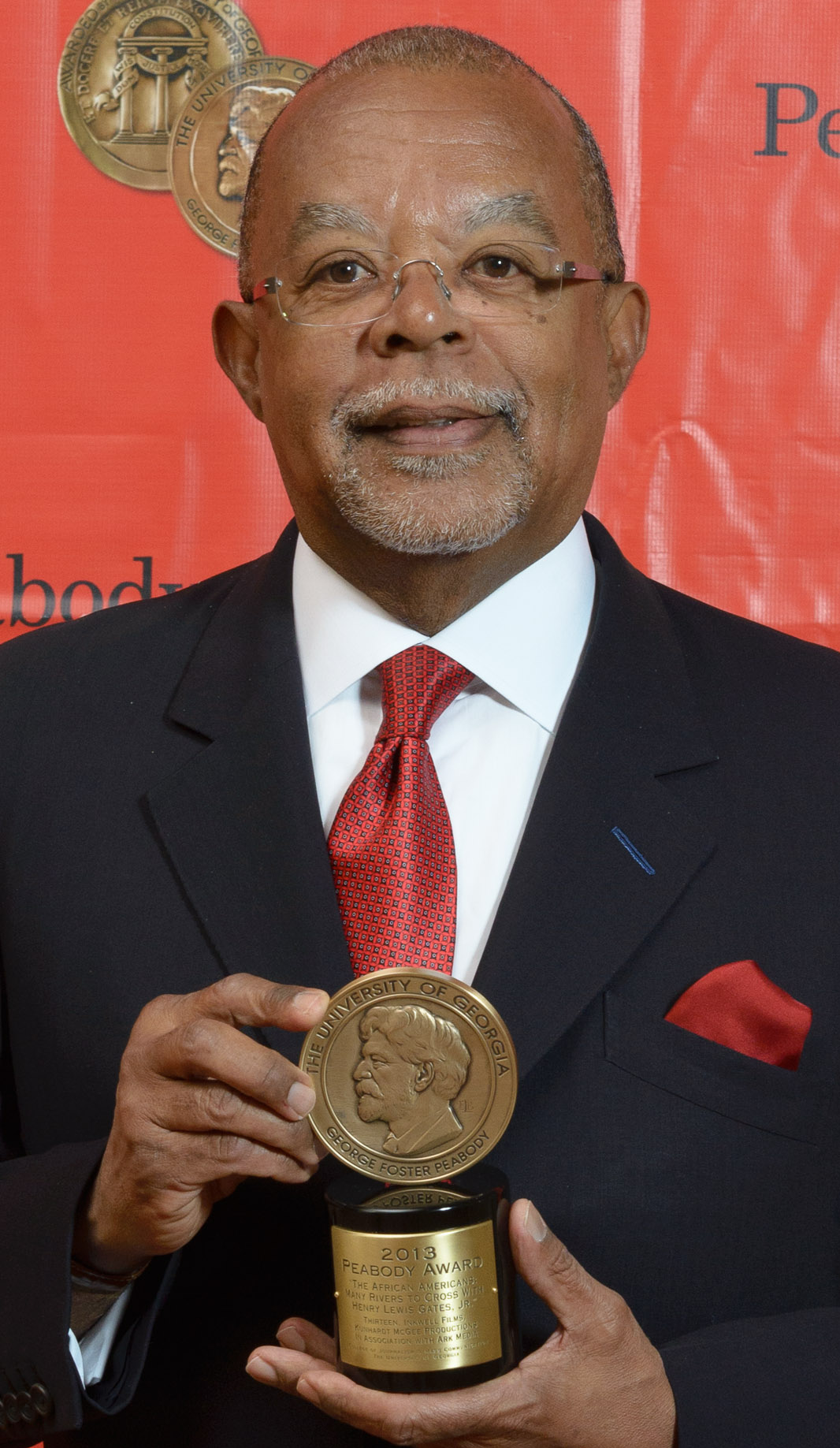
Henry Louis Gates Jr.

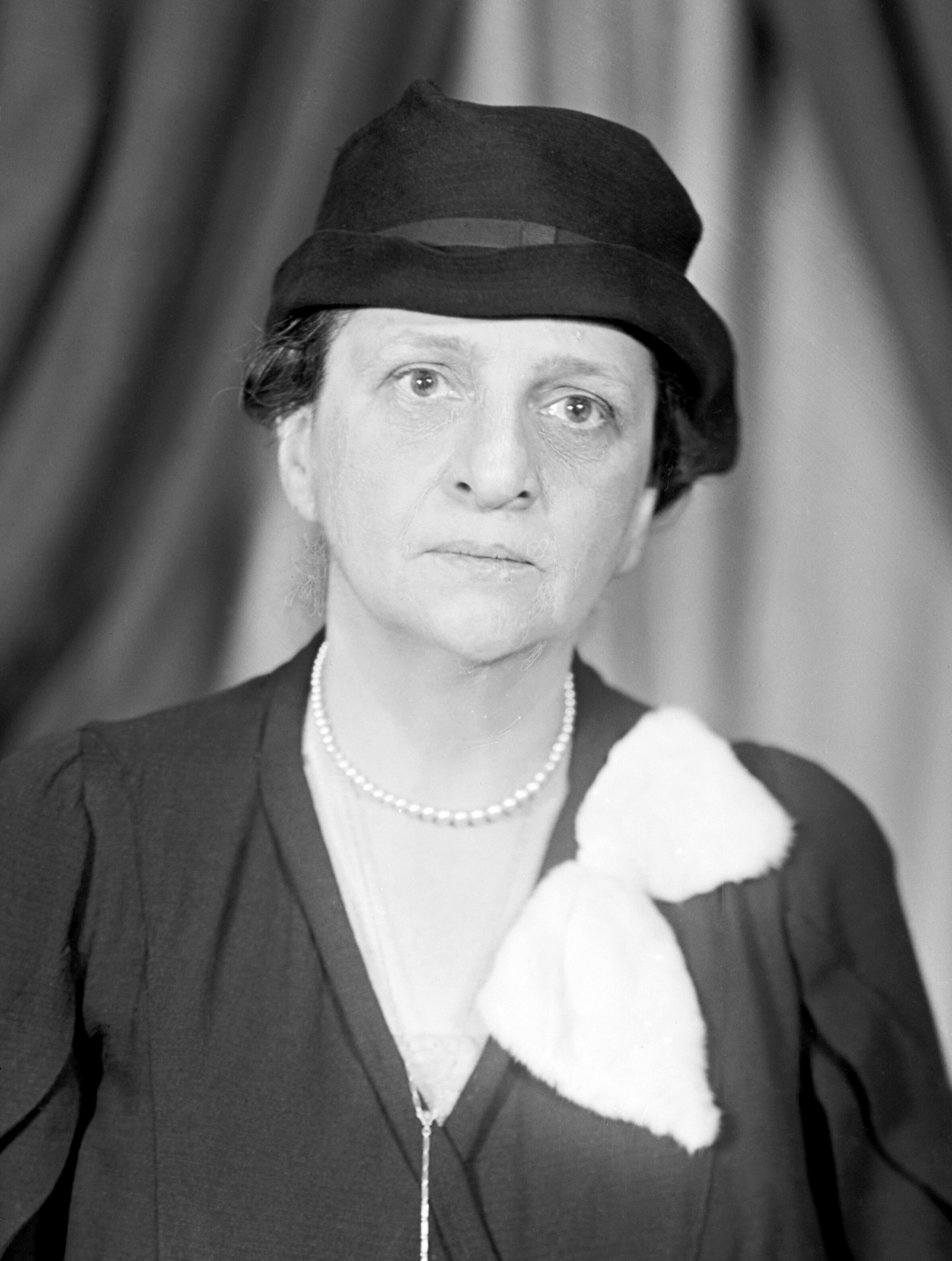
Frances Perkins

Richard Feynman

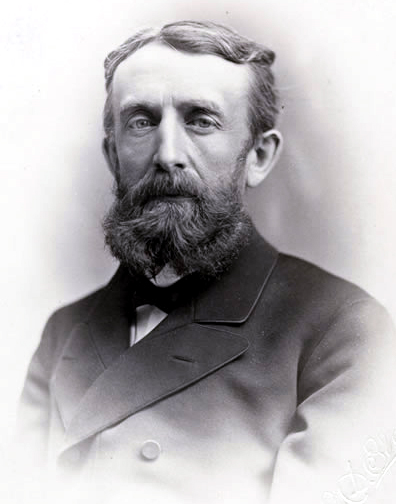
Andrew Dickson White

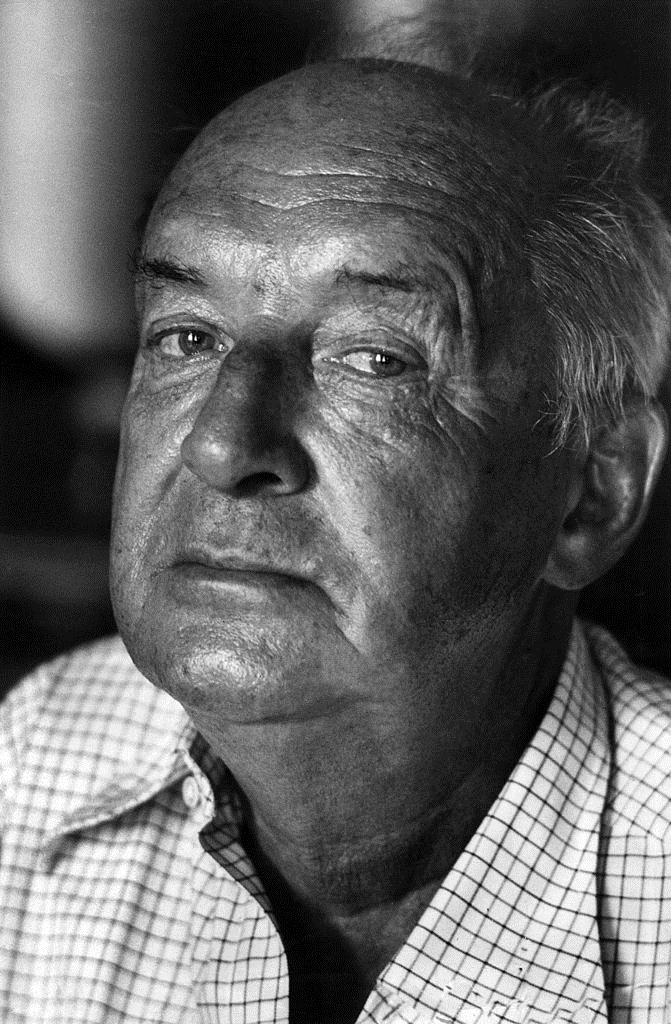
Vladimir Nabokov

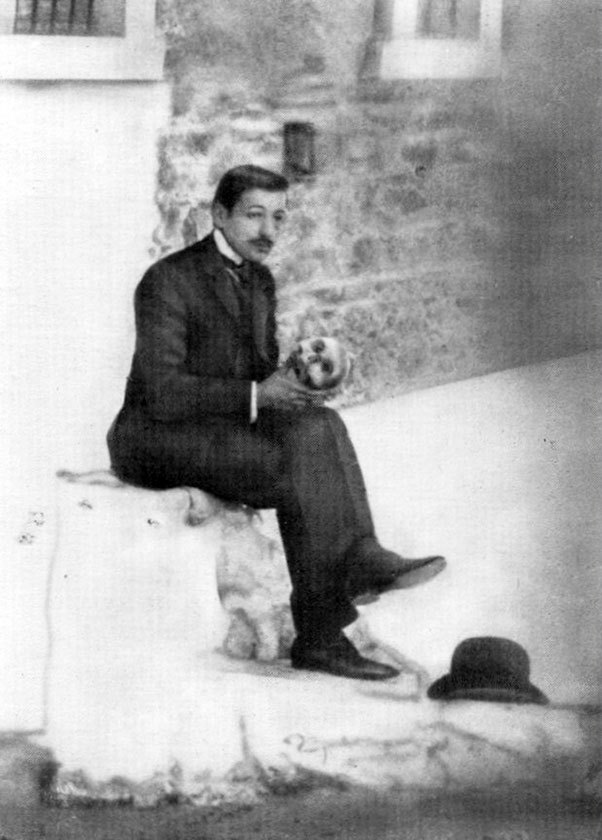
Georgios Papanikolaou

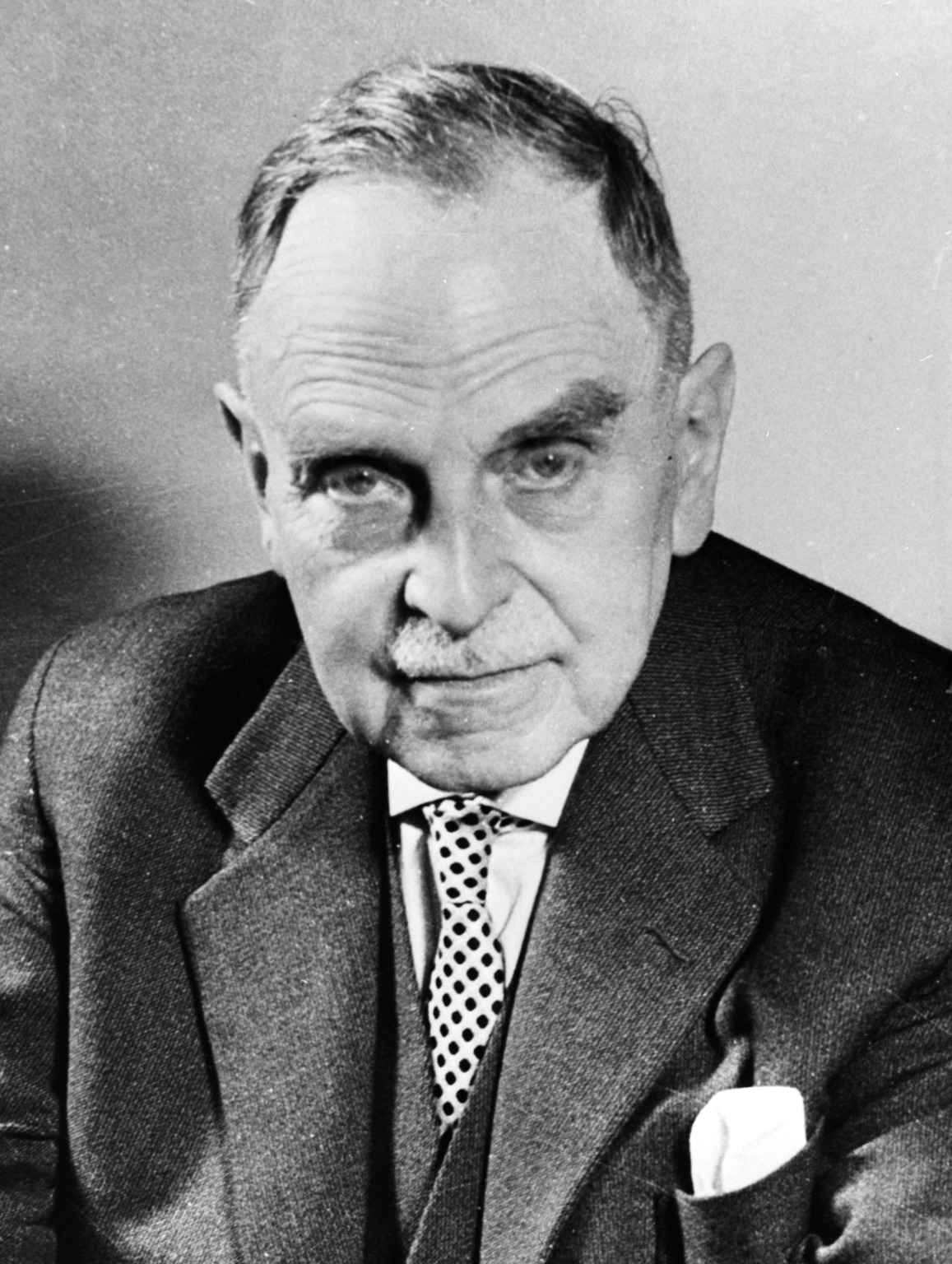
Otto Hahn

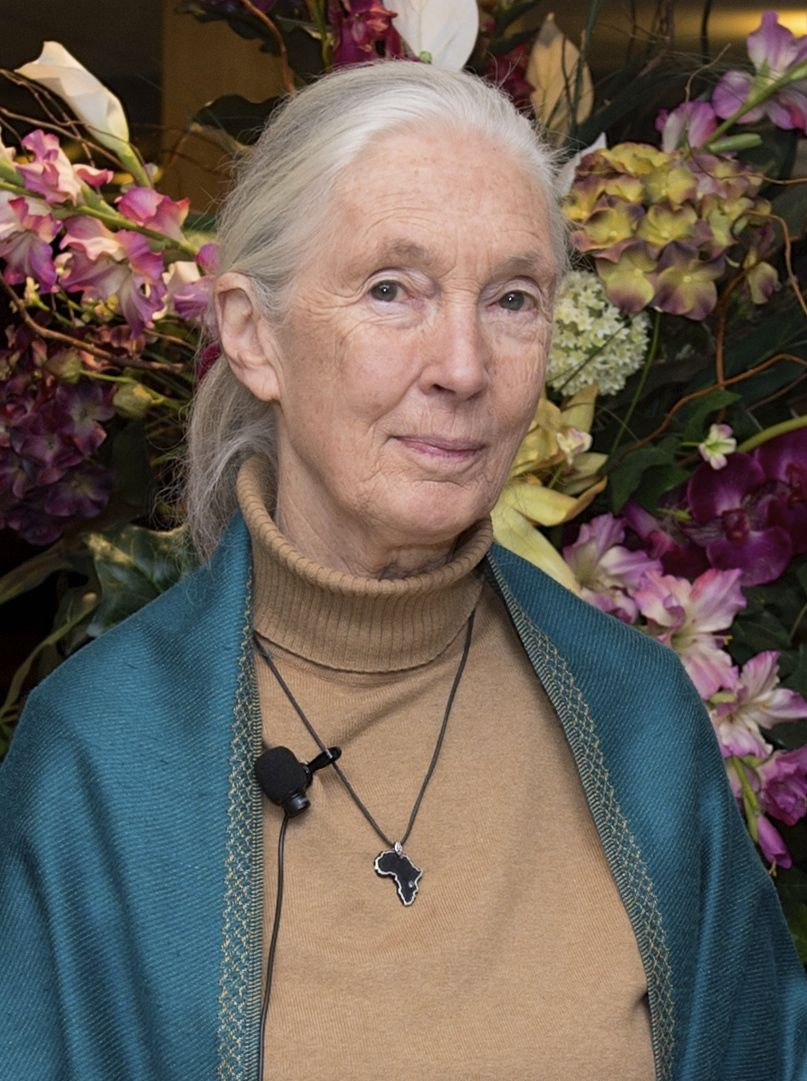
Jane Goodall

As of October 2024, Cornell faculty members, researchers, and alumni included 63 Nobel laureates.

As of 2023, Cornell had 1,637 full- and part-time professional faculty on the main campus, excluding those affiliated with Weill Cornell Medical College.

Notable current and former faculty include Hans Bethe, Frances Perkins, Charles Evans Hughes, Georgios Papanikolaou, Carl Sagan, M. H. Abrams, Vladimir Nabokov, Henry Louis Gates Jr., and Ray Wu.

== See also ==
- Cornell Law School
- Cornell Notes
- Cornell realism
