= Christ Church (Sparkill, New York) =

Historic church in New York, United States

- U.S. National Register of Historic Places
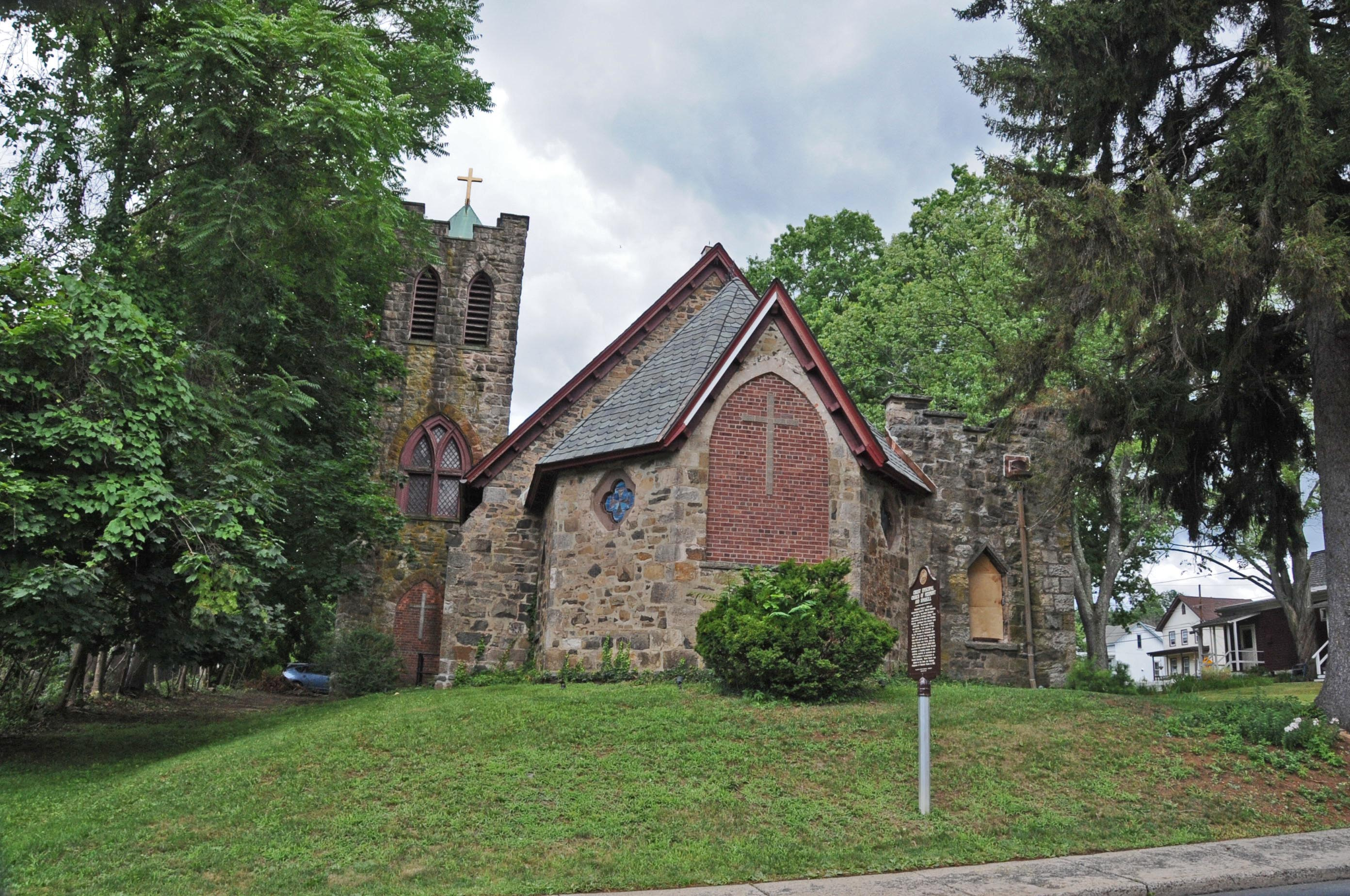

- Location within New York Location within the United States
- Location: 416 Valentine Ave., Sparkill, New York
- Coordinates: 41°1′47.5″N 73°55′34.8″W
- Area: 0.91 acres (0.37 ha)
- Built: 1864-1865, 1892, c. 1900
- Architect: Charles Babcock
- Architectural style: Gothic Revival
- NRHP reference No.: 11000291
- Added to NRHP: May 18, 2011

Christ Church, also known as Christ Episcopal Church, is a historic Episcopal church located at Sparkill in Rockland County, New York. It was designed by architect Charles Babcock (1829–1913) and built in 1864–1865. It is a Gothic Revival style bluestone rubble church. The stone transepts and bell tower were added in 1892, and the stone entrance porch was added around 1900. It has a steeply pitched gable roof and Gothic arched openings. Also on the property is the contributing parish house (c. 1870, c. 1900-1910) and gatepost.

It was listed on the National Register of Historic Places in 2011.

== Background ==
This stone church was built in 1865. It is Rockland’s first established Episcopal Church. The first service was held in 1847 in a converted warehouse. Christ Church was designed by the Rev. Charles Babcock, one of the preeminent architects in America at that time, and a founder of the American Institute of Architects provided the plans for the church at no charge. The church with its Gothic Revival architecture and Norman-influenced interior, Christ Episcopal Church is quite similar to the many small "chapel-churches" found in the English or Irish countryside. It retains an original chapel altar installed in 1898, and its stone façade is accented by a stained-glass rose window. The window was obtained by the church in 1938 from the Former Wayside Chapel in Grand View-on-Hudson when the chapel was converted to a private residence.
