= Hopson-Swan Estate =

Historic house in New York, United States

- U.S. National Register of Historic Places
- U.S. Historic district
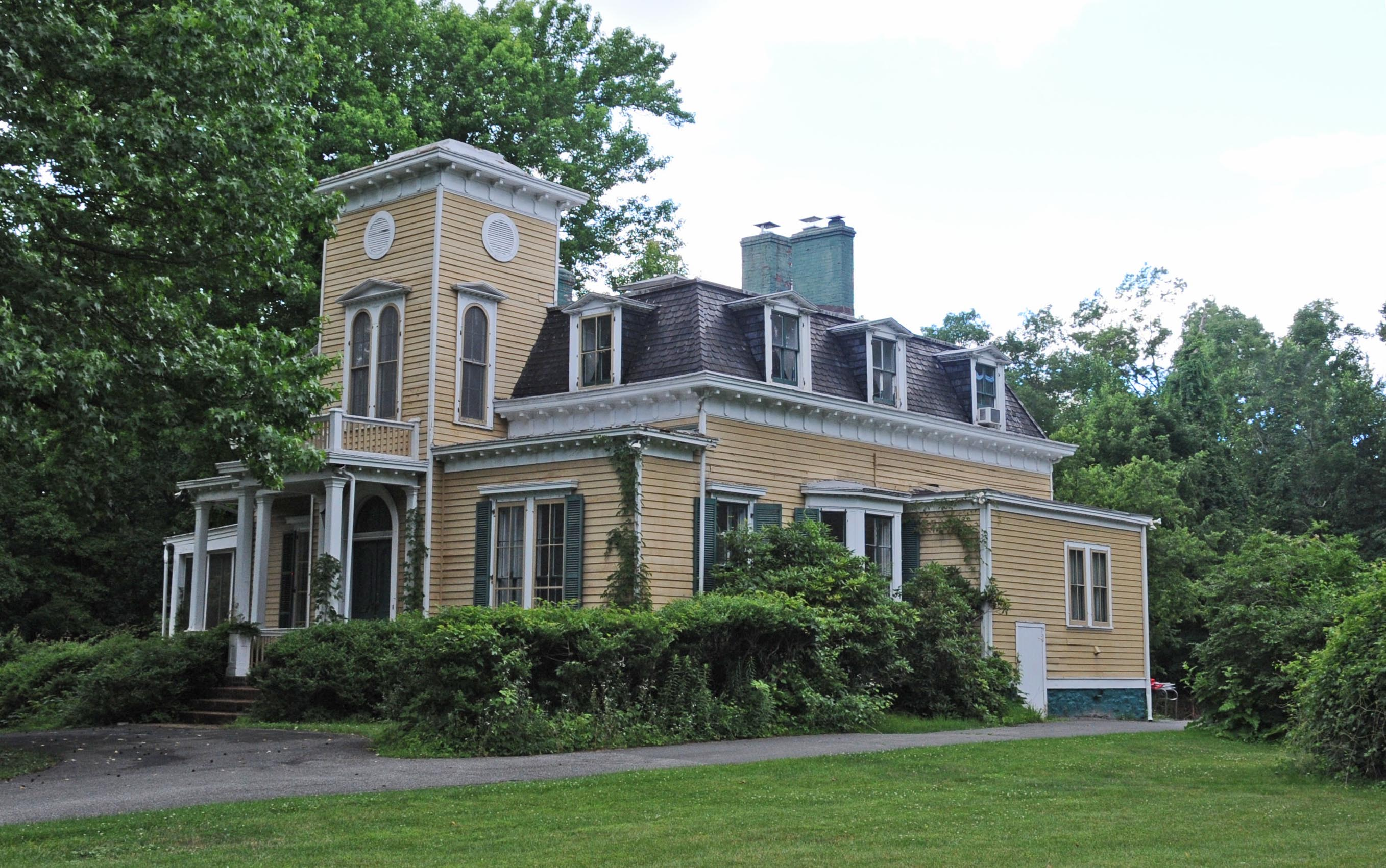

- Location within New York Location within the United States
- Nearest city: Sparkill, New York
- Coordinates: 41°1′37″N 73°54′59″W
- Area: 7.9 acres (3.2 ha)
- Built: 1850
- Architectural style: Mid 19th Century Revival, Late Victorian
- NRHP reference No.: 92001562
- Added to NRHP: November 23, 1992

Hopson-Swan Estate is a national historic district and estate located at Sparkill in Rockland County, New York. It encompasses three contributing buildings and one contributing structure. The district is located within the boundaries of Tallman Mountain State Park and was acquired by the Palisades Interstate Park Commission in 1947. The estate was developed between about 1850 and 1920. The house is a 1 1/2-story frame house on a stone foundation. It was constructed in three phases: about 1850, expanded and restyled in 1869, and also about 1920. Also on the property is a cast iron gazebo and two small carriage houses.

It was listed on the National Register of Historic Places in 1992.
