= Tjaden =

Tjaden is a surname. Notable people with the surname include:

- Janis Paige (1922–2024), born Donna Mae Tjaden, American actress and singer
- Olive Frances Tjaden (1904–1997), American pioneering woman architect
- Walter Tjaden (1906–1985), German film producer and sound engineer

== See also ==
- Tjaden, a fictional character in the 1929 novel All Quiet on the Western Front
