= St. Andrew's Episcopal Church (Walden, New York) =

Historic church in New York, United States

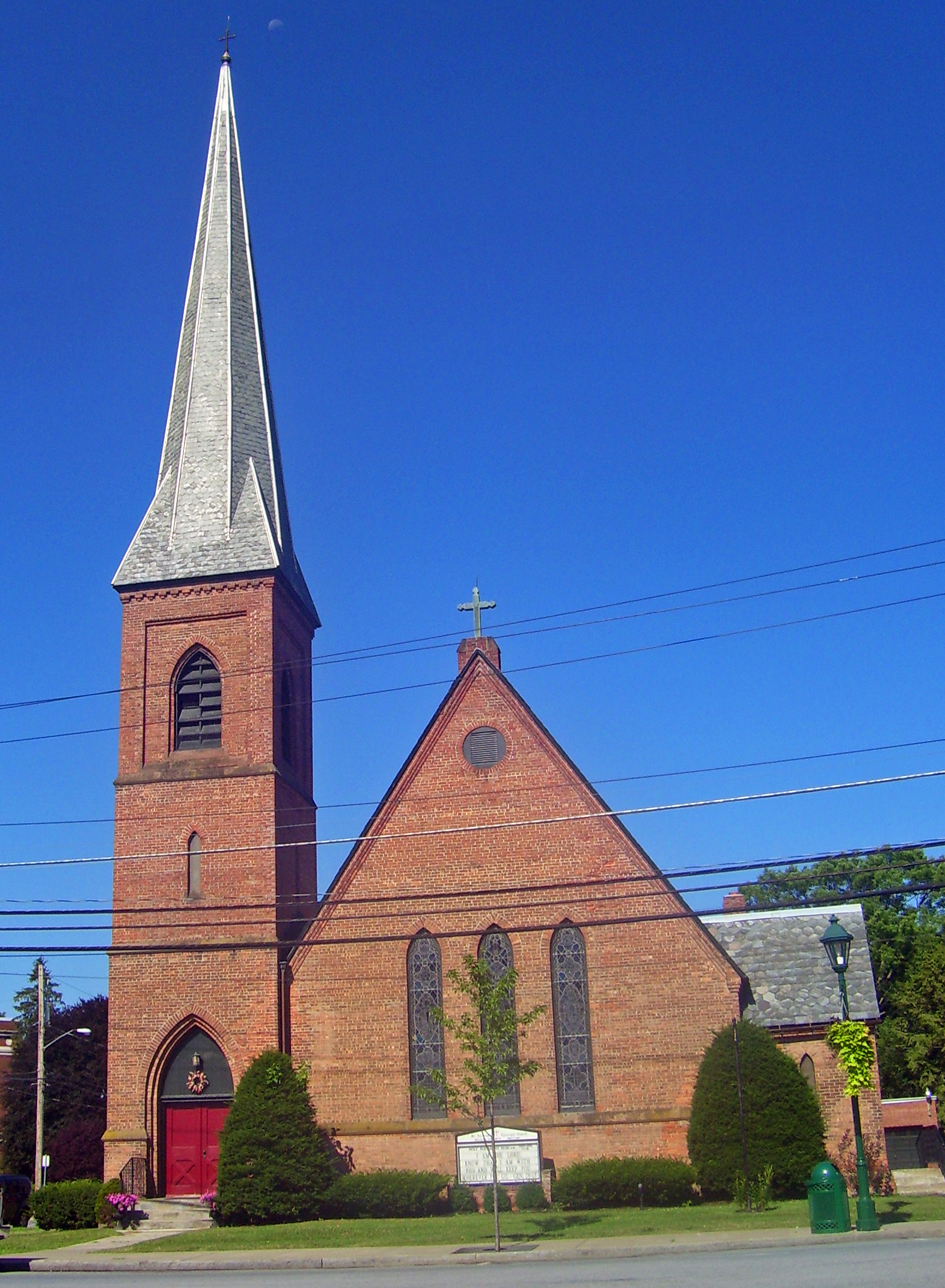
- Front (east) elevation, 2008

Religion
- Affiliation: Episcopal Church in the United States of America
- Leadership: The Rev. M. Chanta Bhan, Interim Priest
- Year consecrated: 1880

Location
- Location: Walden, NY, United States
- Interactive map of St. Andrew's Episcopal Church
- Coordinates: 41°33′36″N 74°11′24″W

Architecture
- Architect: Charles Babcock
- Type: Church and chapel
- Style: Gothic Revival
- Completed: 1871

Specifications
- Direction of façade: East
- Materials: brick, brownstone

U.S. National Register of Historic Places
- Added to NRHP: June 13, 2008
- NRHP Reference no.: 08000513

St. Andrew's Episcopal Church is located at the corner of Walnut and Orchard Street in the village of Walden, New York, United States. It is part of Wallkill River Episcopal, with its sister church St. Francis of Assisi Episcopal Church in Montgomery, NY. It is a brick Gothic Revival structure designed and built in 1871 by Charles Babcock, a former partner of Richard Upjohn. Located at the center of town, near the village hall, it is a local landmark that dominates the village's skyline.

Babcock, who was himself an Episcopal priest, designed the building with the Ecclesiological theories of Anglican church architecture in mind. It has been renovated slightly since its construction, and joined to a nearby chapel, but remains largely intact, exemplifying those theories. In 2008 the church and its rectory were listed on the National Register of Historic Places.

The church reported 155 members in 2015 and 55 members in 2023; no membership statistics were reported in 2024 parochial reports. Plate and pledge income for the congregation in 2024 was $53,146 with average Sunday attendance (ASA) of 27 persons.

== Property ==
The property includes two contributing resources, the church and its rectory. A chapel that was originally freestanding has been connected to the church.

=== Church ===
The church's main facade faces east, towards the triangle of Orchard, Scofield and Walnut streets at the center of town. Opposite is the village's memorial to the local members of the 124th New York Volunteer Infantry Regiment, the "Orange Blossoms", who served with distinction in the Union Army during the Civil War. The village hall is located diagonally across from it on Walnut Street.

It is a single-story brick structure with a steeply-pitched gabled roof. On the southeast side of the nave, near the front entrance, is a bell tower with a tall spire. It and the church's main roof are shingled in slate. The walls are reddish-brown brick laid in common bond. The foundation is of locally quarried brownstone, with a datestone in the southeast corner.

Three narrow Gothic lancet windows resting on a brownstone course are evenly spaced across the front, with a roundel high above. The roofline is marked by a corbelled cornice with a metal Latin cross at the gable's apex. The main entrance, at the foot of the bell tower, has double wooden doors, each with a St. Andrew's cross in the lower corner, set in a Gothic arch surrounded with three brick courses. A louvered, recessed Gothic arch marks the bell stage of the tower, which then gives way after brief corbels to the spire, topped with another cross.

The four-bay south face, looking out on Orchard Street, has a pair of lancet windows, similar to but smaller than their counterparts on the front. It is broken by the chapel transept, where another lancet window was once bricked over. To the west of the transept is the connection to the chapel. On the north side are an identical grouping of windows and a porch which provides direct access to the nave. A tall brick chimney rises from the wall here.

Inside, the sanctuary has the pews arranged with a center aisle and two side ones along the walls. The ceiling is made of beaded wooden boards that expose the hammerbeam roof's trusses. Chamfered wooden posts rise up to it from between the lancet window pairs on either side. A carved wooden altar with Gothic motifs sits in front of the lancet windows in the west wall. In the rear are an office and robing room.

The basement is largely unfinished and used for storage. Support functions, such as a kitchen and meeting space, are handled by the rooms of the former chapel.

=== Rectory ===
The rectory, an L-shaped two-and-a-half-story brick house, is located just north of the church along Walnut Street. The three-bay front facade extends east from the larger main block in the rear. It features segmentally arched windows with brownstone sills and a wooden porch. The foundation is brownstone.

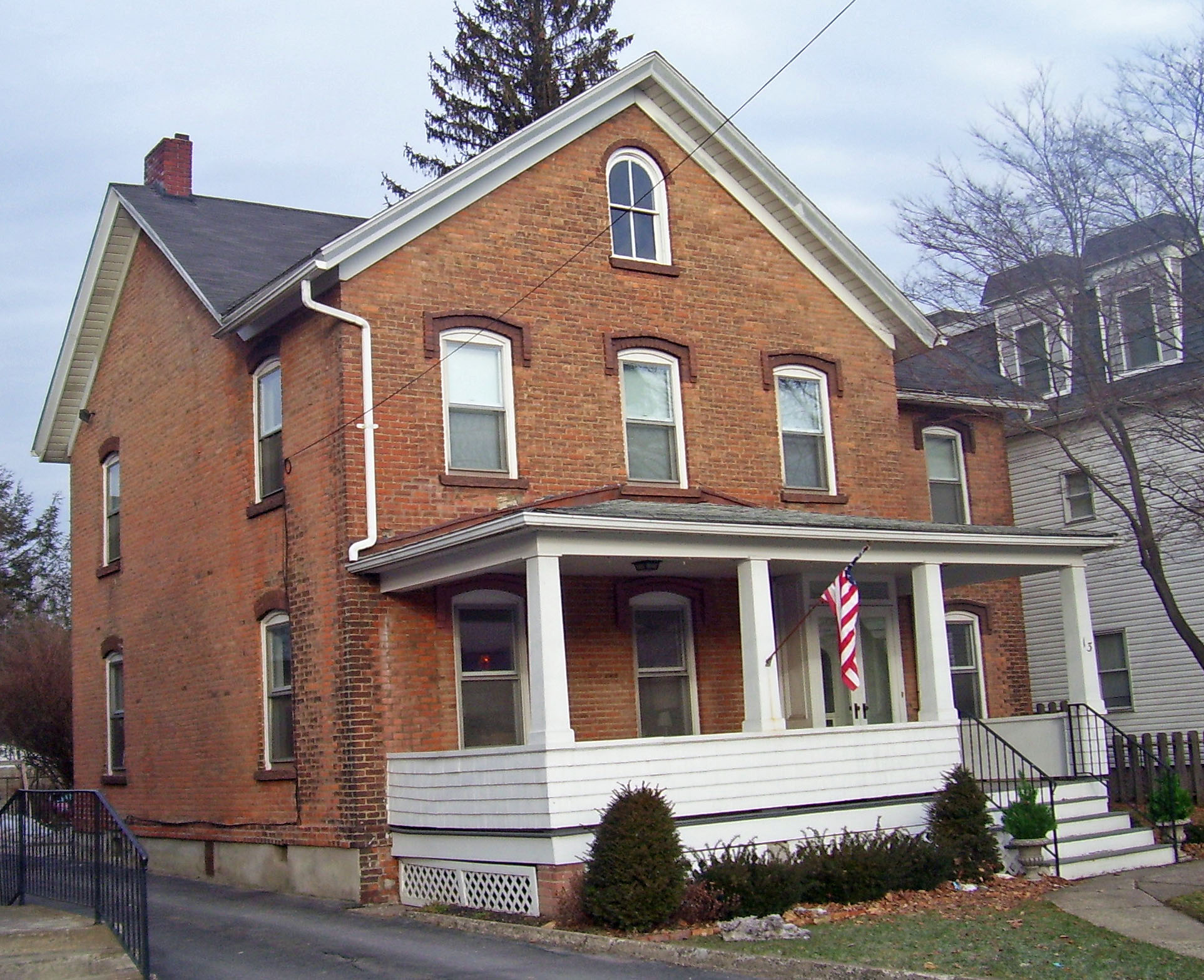
South profile and east (front) elevation of rectory, 2009

Its finishes inside date from the original construction and later renovations. Of note from the latter are the front staircase and architrave between the front and rear parlors.

== Aesthetics ==
Like Upjohn and other Episcopal architects designing churches for that faith in the mid-19th century, Babcock was strongly influenced by articles and essays in The Ecclesiologist, a journal published by members of England's Oxford Movement, which sought a return to more traditional religious practices in Anglicanism. In architecture that meant the older forms of the English country parish church, many built during the Middle Ages, such as St Michael's Church, Longstanton, which has a similar main block to St. Andrew's.

Babcock's initials are found on many sketches of Upjohn's, including one church with tower in Upjohn's pattern book Rural Architecture that strongly resembles St. Andrew's. Christ Church in Ballston Spa, completed by Upjohn's office after he left, also bears a resemblance, although its massing and decoration are less restrained than Babcock typically was.

For St. Andrew's, he offset the tower to the side, a variation that had become popular with Ecclesiological architects around the mid-19th century. This created a more Picturesque effect than leaving it in the center. Because of this, and the limitations of the lot, the church's chancel is on the west end rather than liturgical east as most Ecclesiologist-influenced churches do.

The rectory, completed slightly after the main church, shows more vernacular influences of its day, and those of later renovations. Its main design is Italianate, but the current porch, rebuilt in the early 20th century, is a Craftsman-style treatment of the original.

== History ==
The St. Andrew's congregation predates its current church building by a century. It was one of three charters in the region obtained in July 1770 by the Rev. John Sayre, sent as a missionary to the Hudson Valley from London. After the Revolution, it shared its rector with St. George's in nearby Newburgh.

Congregants had moved from a primitive log cabin to a more permanent meetinghouse as the church grew, and in 1826 they decided to build a larger one in Walden, at the time an unincorporated preindustrial hamlet known mainly for its mill on the Wallkill River. It was finished and consecrated in September 1827.

After the Civil War, the church needed to expand again. It bought the current lot in 1871 from William Scofield, after whom a nearby street is named, for $800 ($21,500 in 2009 dollars). Babcock, at the time transitioning from his position as rector of St. James' Church in Arden to the first professor at what is now Cornell University's College of Architecture, Art, and Planning, delivered plans and construction documents before leaving for Ithaca. Local contractors using local materials were hired, and the church was finished later that year. The debt incurred by the construction was enough that it took until 1880 to pay off, and only then was the church formally consecrated.

The rectory was built the following year. In 1884 the congregation decided to accommodate continuing growth by building the chapel on the western end of the lot. At the turn of the century the oil lamps that had originally lit the church's sanctuary were replaced with electric models, and in 1915 the rectory received its remodeled porch and some changes to the interior, such as the rear parlor fireplace.

Eventually the congregation decided to combine the chapel and church into one large building. This began in 1924 with a simple hyphen, and culminated 15 years later with the current linkage and its accompanying changes to the chapel's fenestration. The church and rectory have remained intact since that time.
