= Tao Sule DuFour =

American architect and scholar

Tao Sule DuFour is an architect and scholar whose work explores the overlaps between architecture, philosophy, and anthropology. He is currently an assistant professor in the Department of Architecture in Cornell University's College of Architecture, Art and Planning and the director of the Landscape and Urban Environmentalities Lab.

== Education ==
DuFour holds a Ph.D. in architecture (2012) and a master's degree in the history and philosophy of architecture from Cambridge University (2004), and a Bachelor of Architecture from The Cooper Union (2002).

== Academic career ==
DuFour was the 2012 - 2014 SARUP research fellow at the University of Wisconsin–Milwaukee and was awarded the Rome Prize in Architecture 2012–13 at The British School at Rome. In addition, Dufour has received the Overseas Research Scholarship Award (Cambridge University 2006), Prince of Wales Chevening Scholarship (Cambridge Commonwealth Trust 2003) and the Eleanor Allwork Scholarship Honor grant (AIA NY Chapter 2001).
