= Charles Babcock (architect) =

American architect

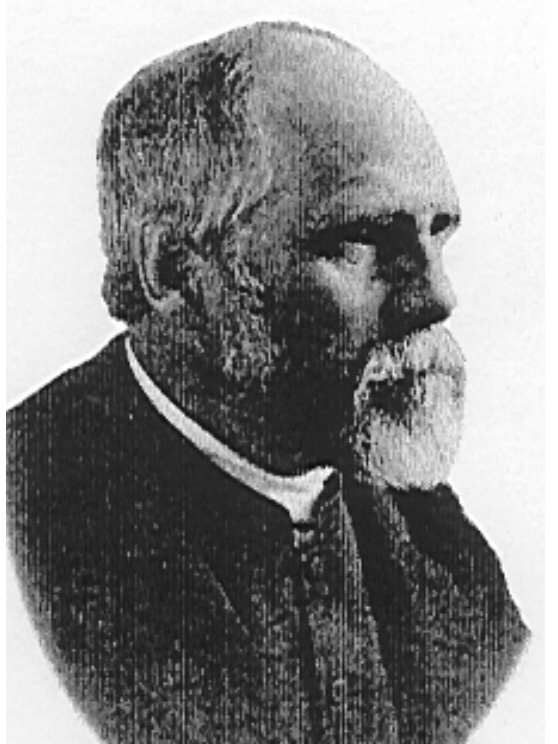
Portrait of Charles Babcock

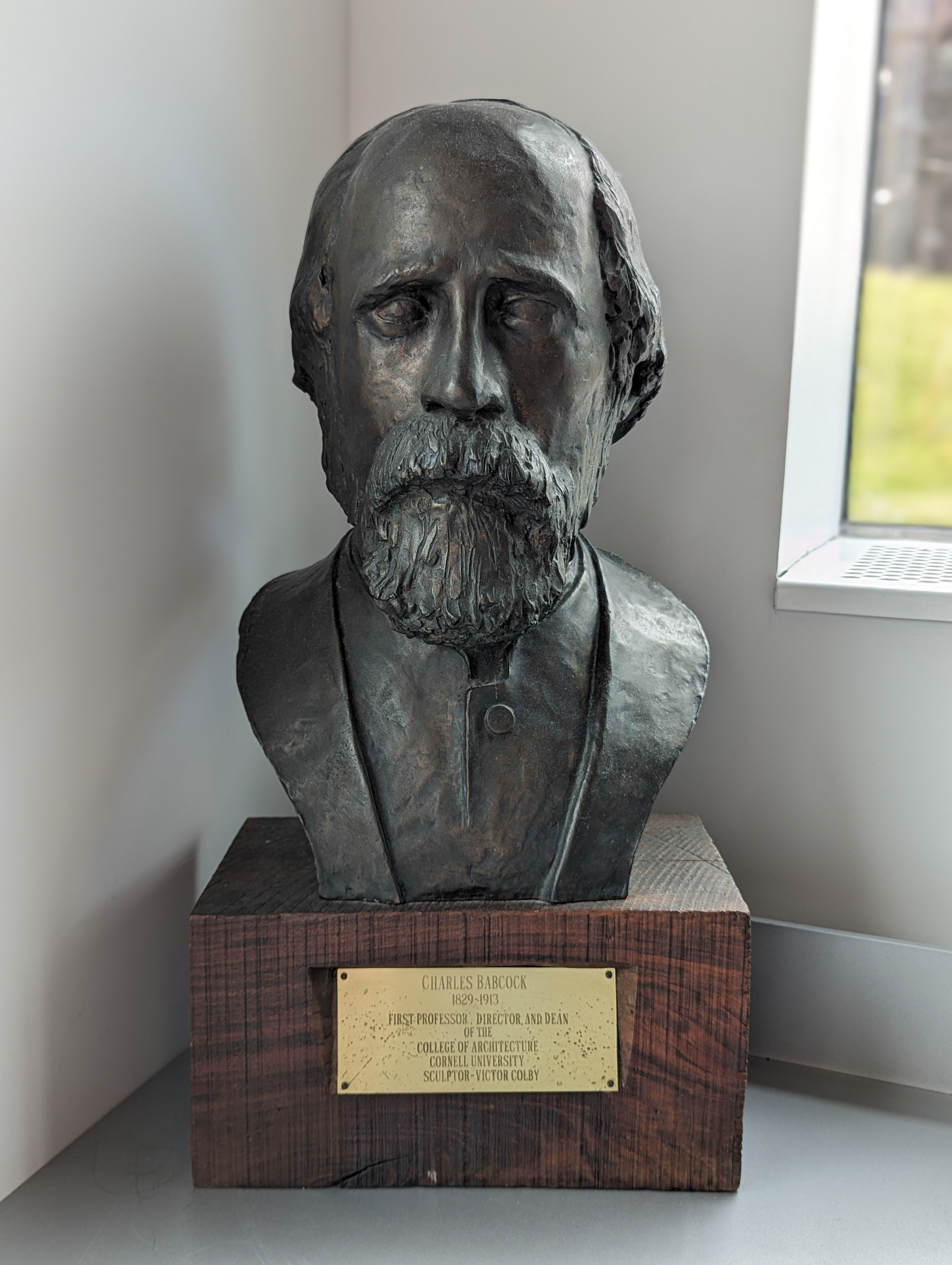
bust of Professor Babcock, Mui Ho Fine Arts Library at Cornell

Charles Babcock (March 23, 1829 – August 27, 1913) was an American architect, academic, Episcopal priest and founding member of the American Institute of Architects. He was elevated to the AIA College of Fellows in 1857.

He was born in Ballston Spa, New York. After being educated at Union College in 1847, he served as an apprentice of Richard Upjohn while he designed Trinity Church in Manhattan. Remaining with the firm for five years, he became a partner and later married Upjohn's daughter. From 1858 to 1862 he taught in St. Stephen's college, Annandale, New York. His interest in Gothic Revival architecture led him to study for the ministry, and after his training he became the priest and rector of an Episcopal church in Arden, New York.

He was elected the first Professor of Architecture at Cornell University on September 18, 1871, essentially founding the College of Architecture, Art, and Planning. While at Cornell, he continued to serve as a minister, and authored two textbooks, Elementary Architecture (1876) and Vaults (1884), and designed several important campus buildings, including Sage Hall, Franklin Hall (later renamed Olive Tjaden Hall), and Sage Chapel. He was a professor until 1897, when he became Professor Emeritus, and served in that position until his death.

He designed Christ Church in Sparkill, New York. The church was listed on the National Register of Historic Places in 2011.

Charles Babcock died in Ithaca, New York at the age of 84.

== Gallery ==
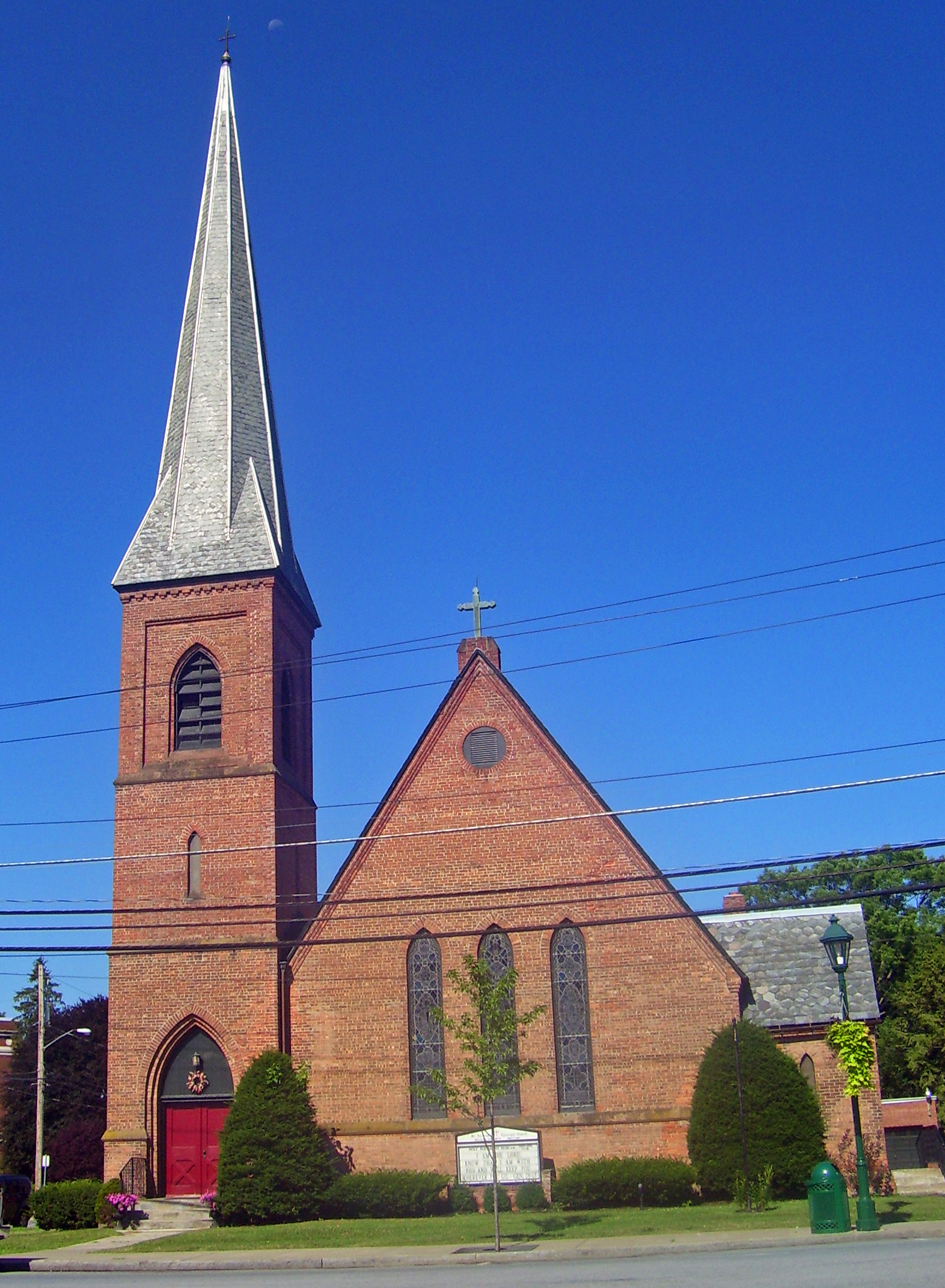
St. Andrew's Episcopal Church in Walden, NY, designed by Babcock in 1871.

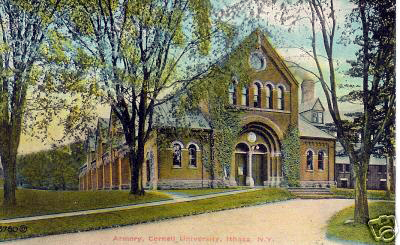
The Cornell Armory, a Babcock building that has since been demolished

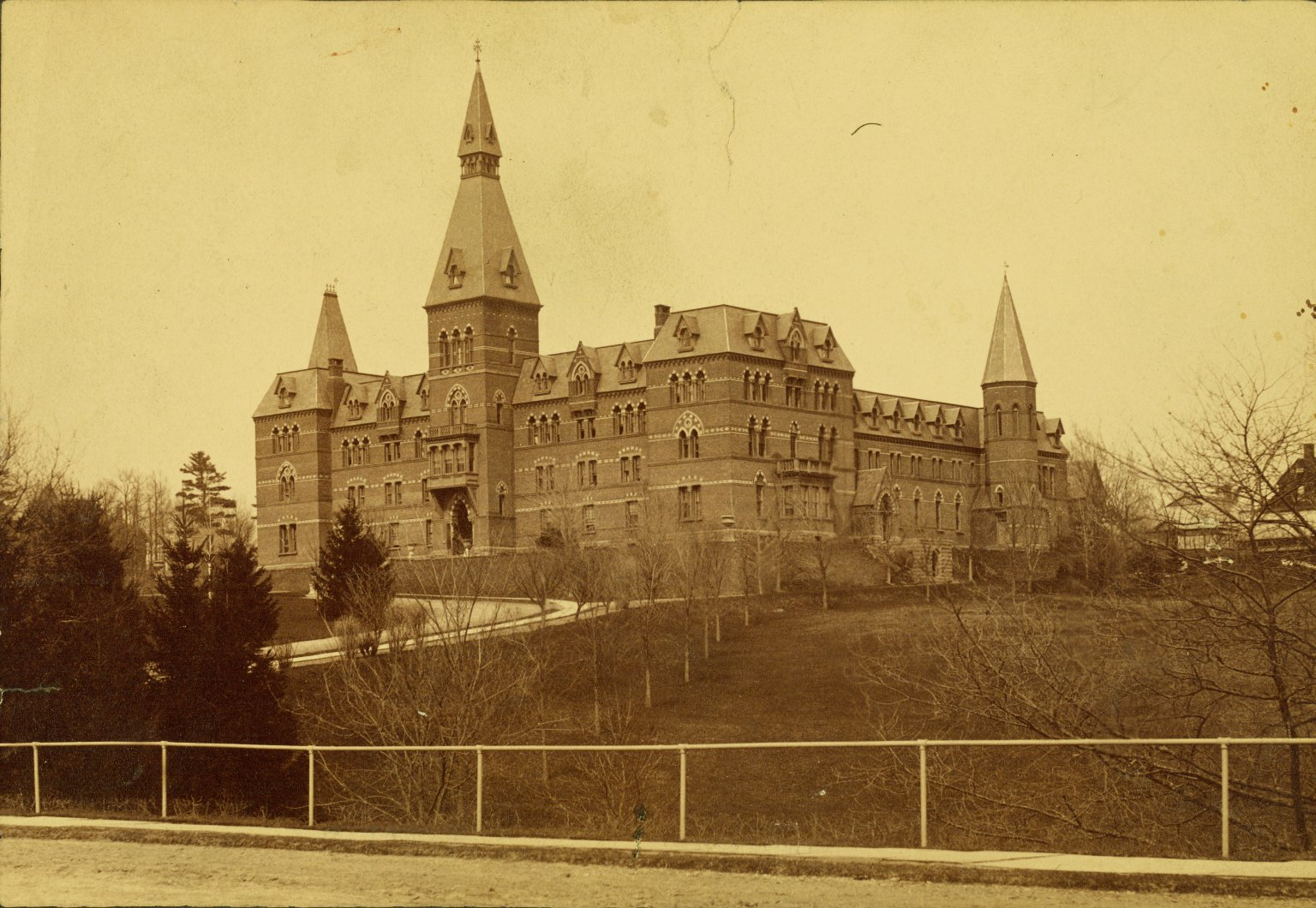
Sage Hall, 1875

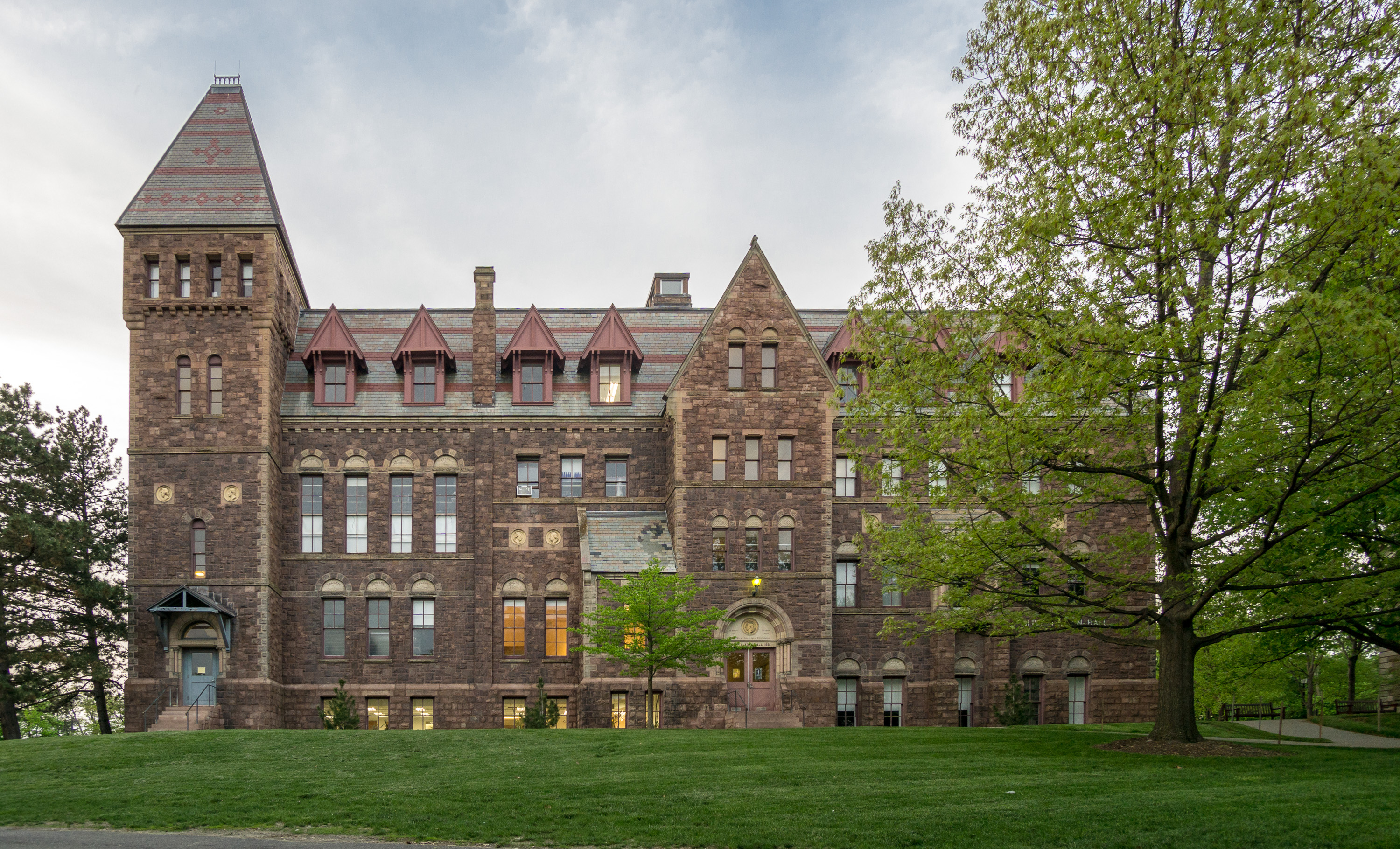
Franklin Hall, now Olive Tjaden Hall, 1883
