= Sparkill, New York =

- Census-designated place
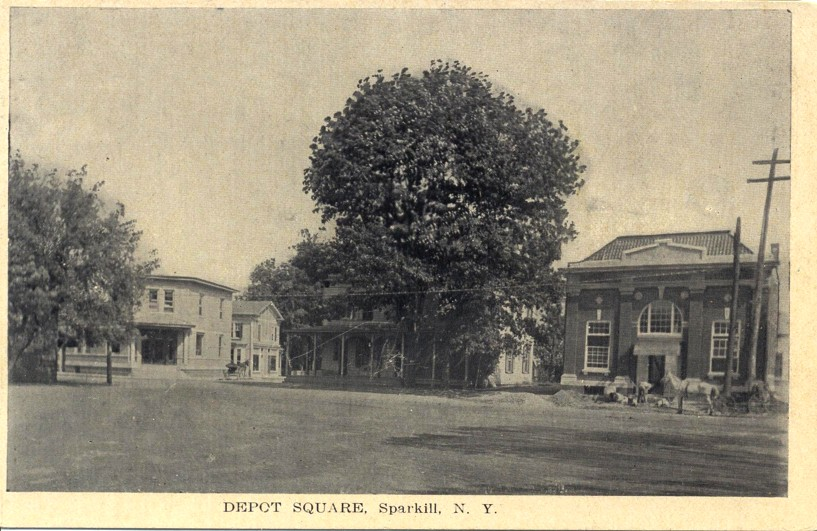
- 1909 image of Depot Square in Sparkill

- Location in Rockland County and the state of New York

- Location within the state of New York
- Coordinates: 41°1′48″N 73°55′41″W
- Country: United States
- State: New York
- County: Rockland
- Town: Orangetown

Area
  - Total: 0.53 sq mi (1.37 km^{2})
  - Land: 0.53 sq mi (1.37 km^{2})
  - Water: 0 sq mi (0.00 km^{2})

Population (2020)
  - Total: 1,581
  - Density: 2,984.9/sq mi (1,152.47/km^{2})
- Time zone: UTC-5 (Eastern (EST))
  - Summer (DST): UTC-4 (EDT)
- ZIP code: 10976
- Area code: 845
- FIPS code: 36-70068
- GNIS feature ID: 02631237

Sparkill (English pronunciation: /ˈspɑːɹkɪl/), formerly known as Tappan Sloat, is a suburban hamlet and census-designated place in Orangetown, New York, United States located north of Palisades; east of Tappan; south of Piermont and west of the Hudson River. As of the 2020 census, Sparkill had a population of 1,581. The hamlet is home to St. Thomas Aquinas College and the Dominican Sisters of Sparkill.

== Geography ==
Sparkill is located at 41°3′52″N 73°57′25″W. According to the United States Census Bureau, the CDP has a total area of 0.529 square mile, all land.

== Demographics ==
Historical population
Census	Pop.	Note	%±
2020	1,581		—
U.S. Decennial Census

As of the 2010 census, there were 1,565 people, 503 homes, and 415 families in Sparkill. The population density was 2,958 persons per square mile. The racial makeup of the CDP was 83.2% White, 2.0% African American, 0.1% Native American, 9.8% Asian, 2.5% from other races, and 2.4% from two or more races. Hispanic or Latino of any race were 12.2% of the population.

There were 504 households, out of which 46.4% had children under the age of 18 living with them, 67.3% were married couples living together, and 17.7% were non-families. 30% of households had individuals over the age of 65. The average household size was 3.11 persons. The median age was 39.9 years.

The median income for a household in the CDP was $77,440, and the median income for a family was $123,750. About 17.6% of all families, or 16.5% of the population were below the poverty line, including 27.7% of those under the age of 18 and 5.5% of those above the age of 65.

== Transportation ==
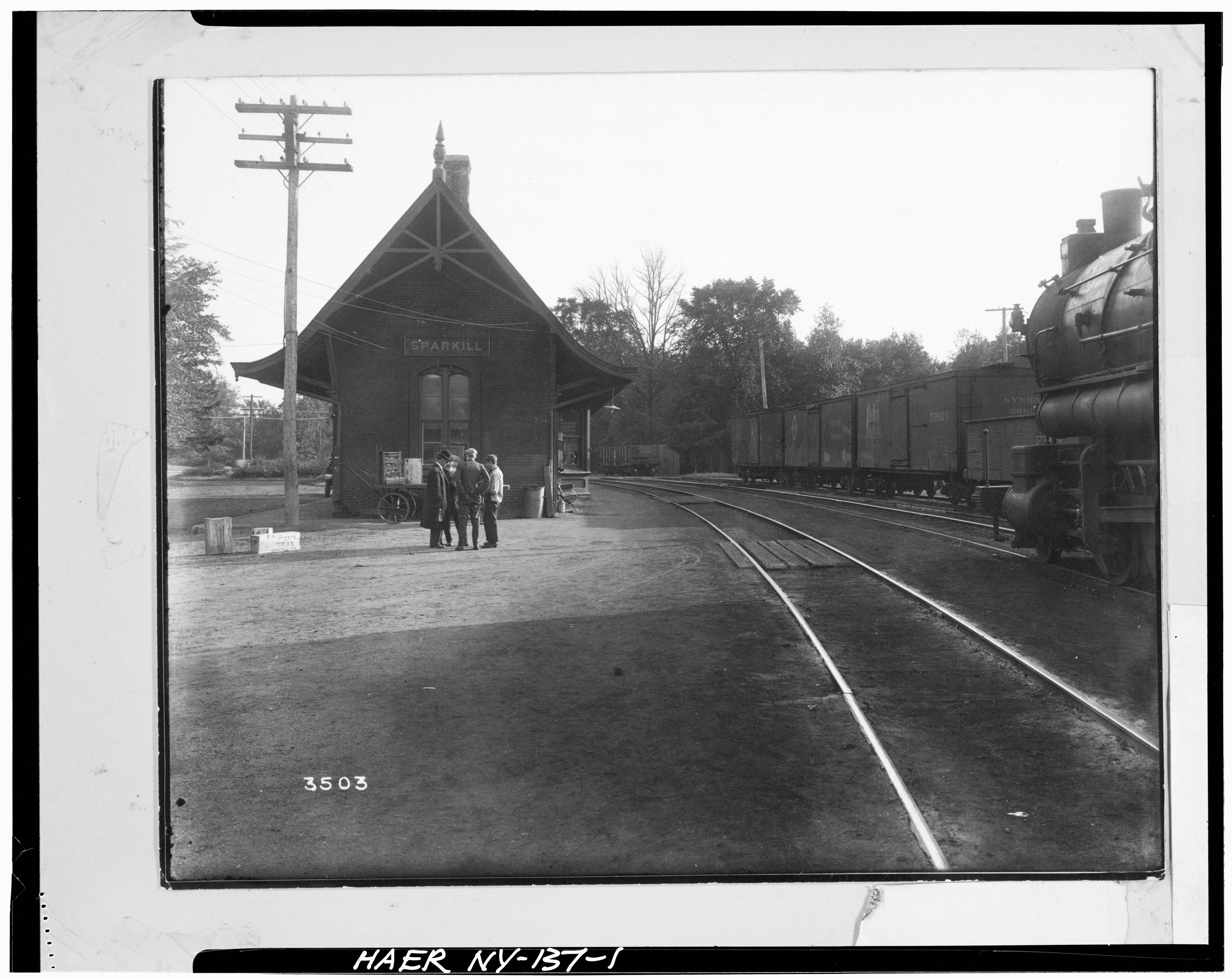
Sparkill Station

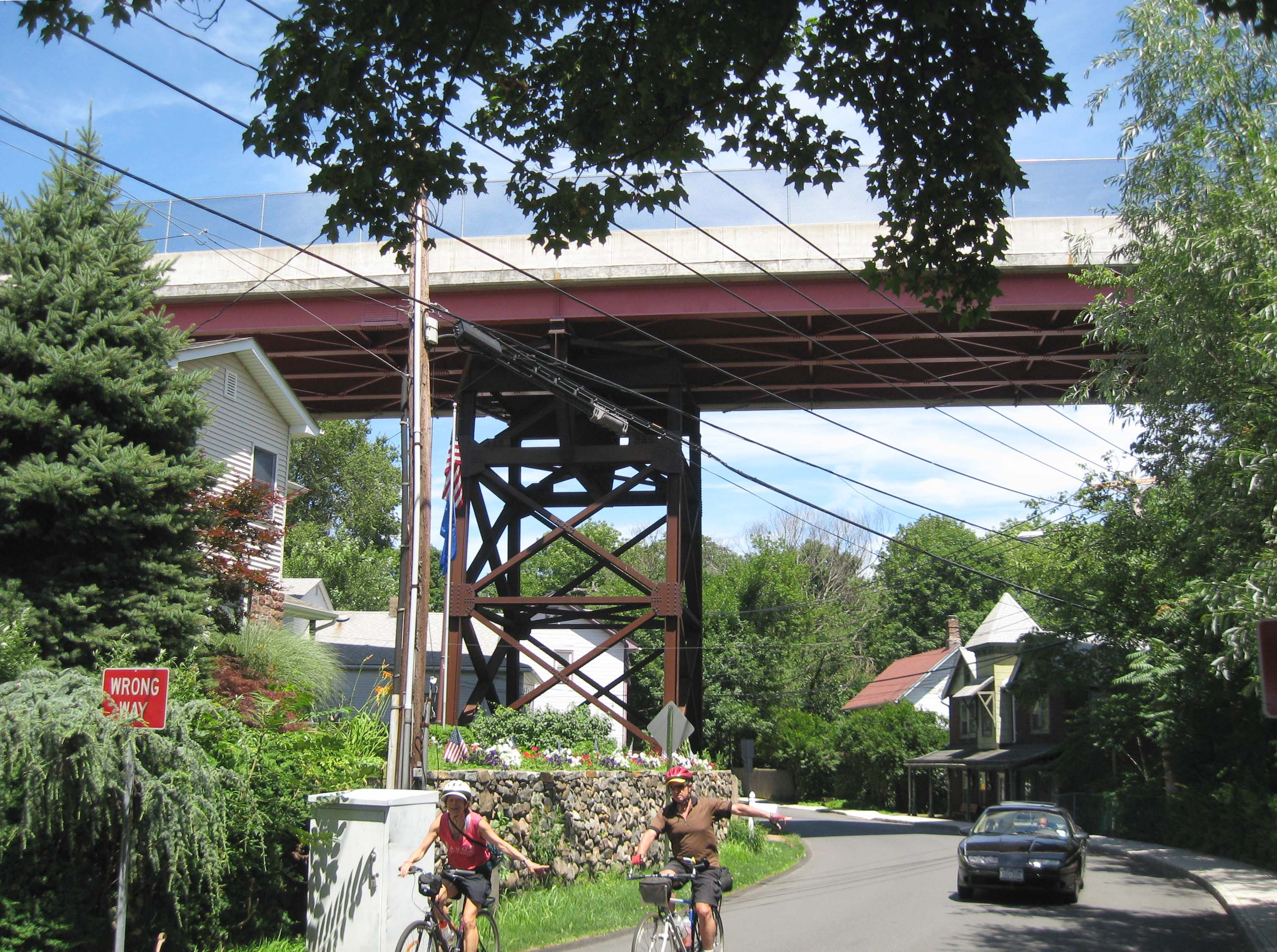
U.S. Route 9W overpass

Important thoroughfares in Sparkill are U.S. Route 9W, New York State Route 340, and Rockland County Route 8. The hamlet is located approximately 3.5 miles south of the Tappan Zee Bridge and 13.9 miles north of the George Washington Bridge.

Public transportation to Sparkill is served by Rockland Coaches, also known as Red and Tan Lines, operated by Coach USA. Rockland Coaches Route 9A connects Sparkill to the George Washington Bridge Bus Terminal, while Route 9T serves the Port Authority Bus Terminal in New York City. All bus service operates from Depot Square, off of Main Street.

Sparkill used to be served by the Northern Branch of the Erie Railroad, with service to Pavonia Terminal in Jersey City, New Jersey. Passenger service was discontinued in 1966 and was replaced by freight service.

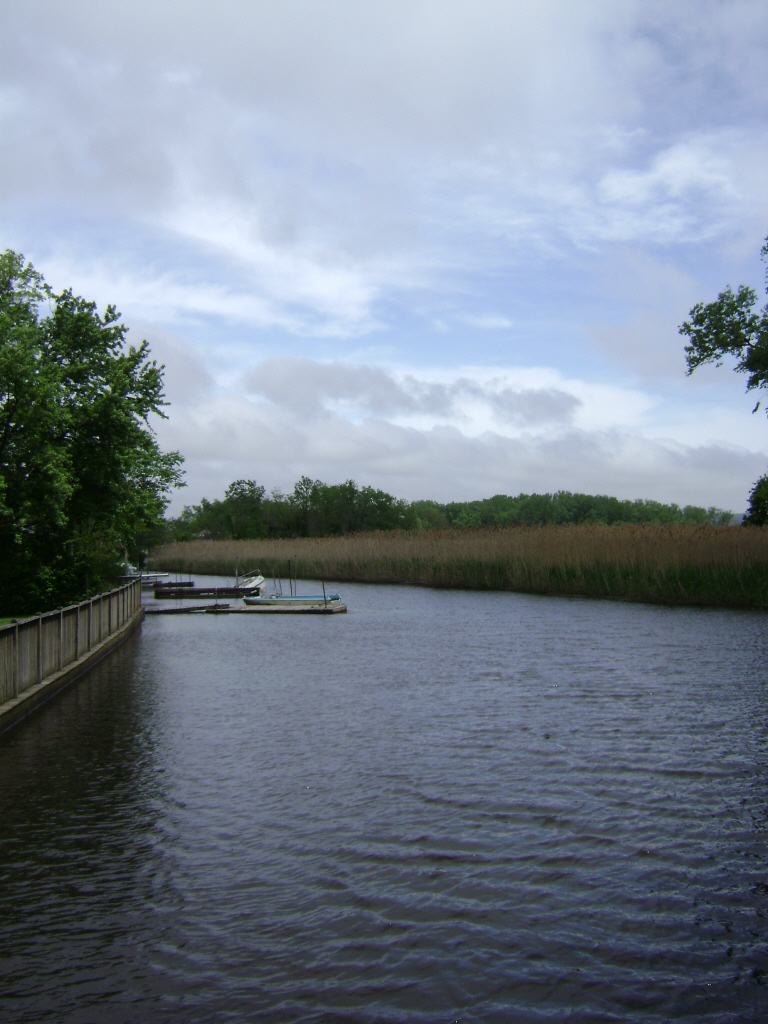
Sparkill Creek

== Tourism ==
=== Historical markers ===
- Fremont Monument, Rockland Cemetery – Kings Highway
- Hopson Swan Estate – (NRHP)
- Saint Charles A.M.E. Zion Church – 432 Valentine Avenue
- Stonehurst – 65 Rockland Road

=== Landmarks and places of interest ===
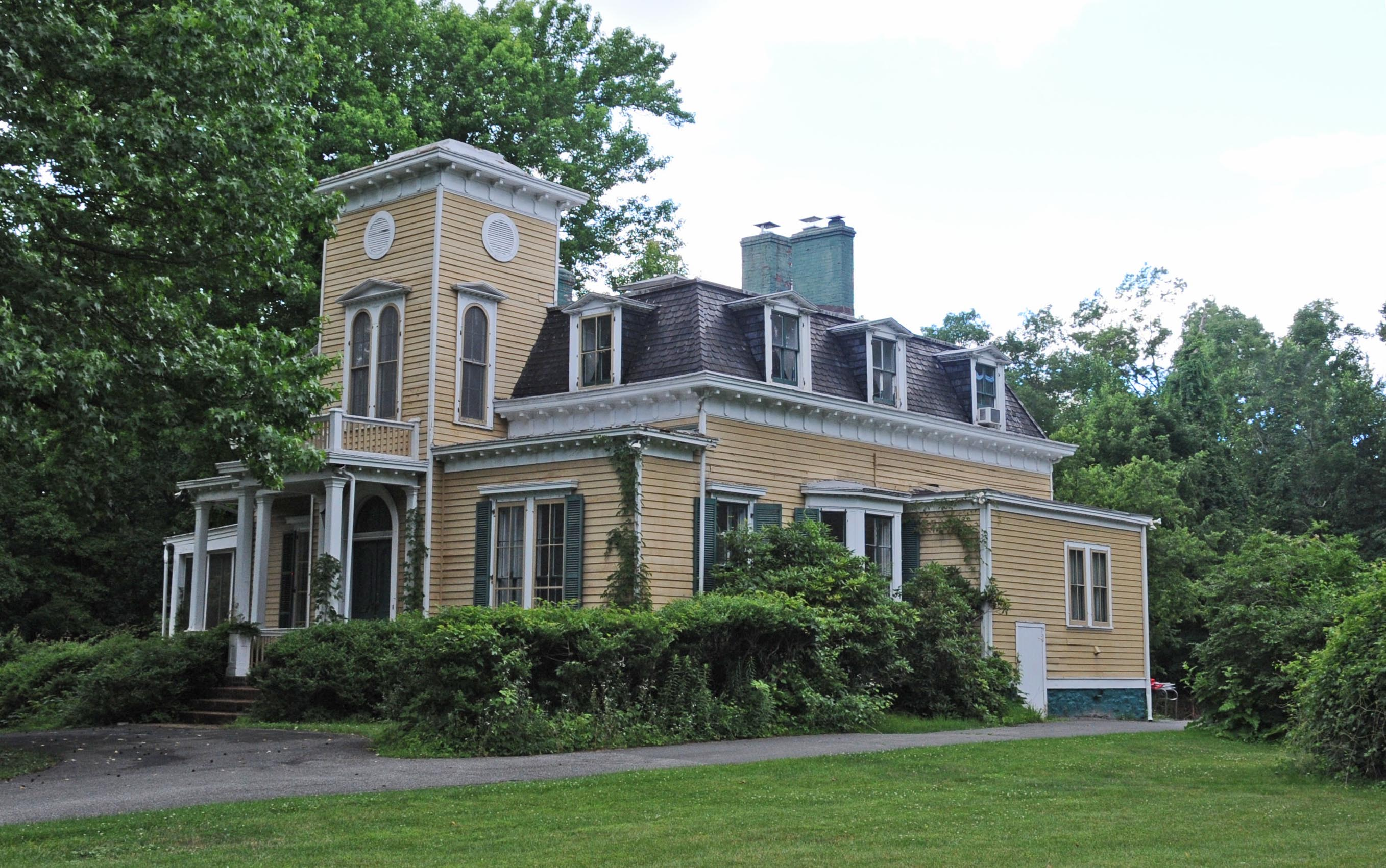
Hopson-Swan Estate

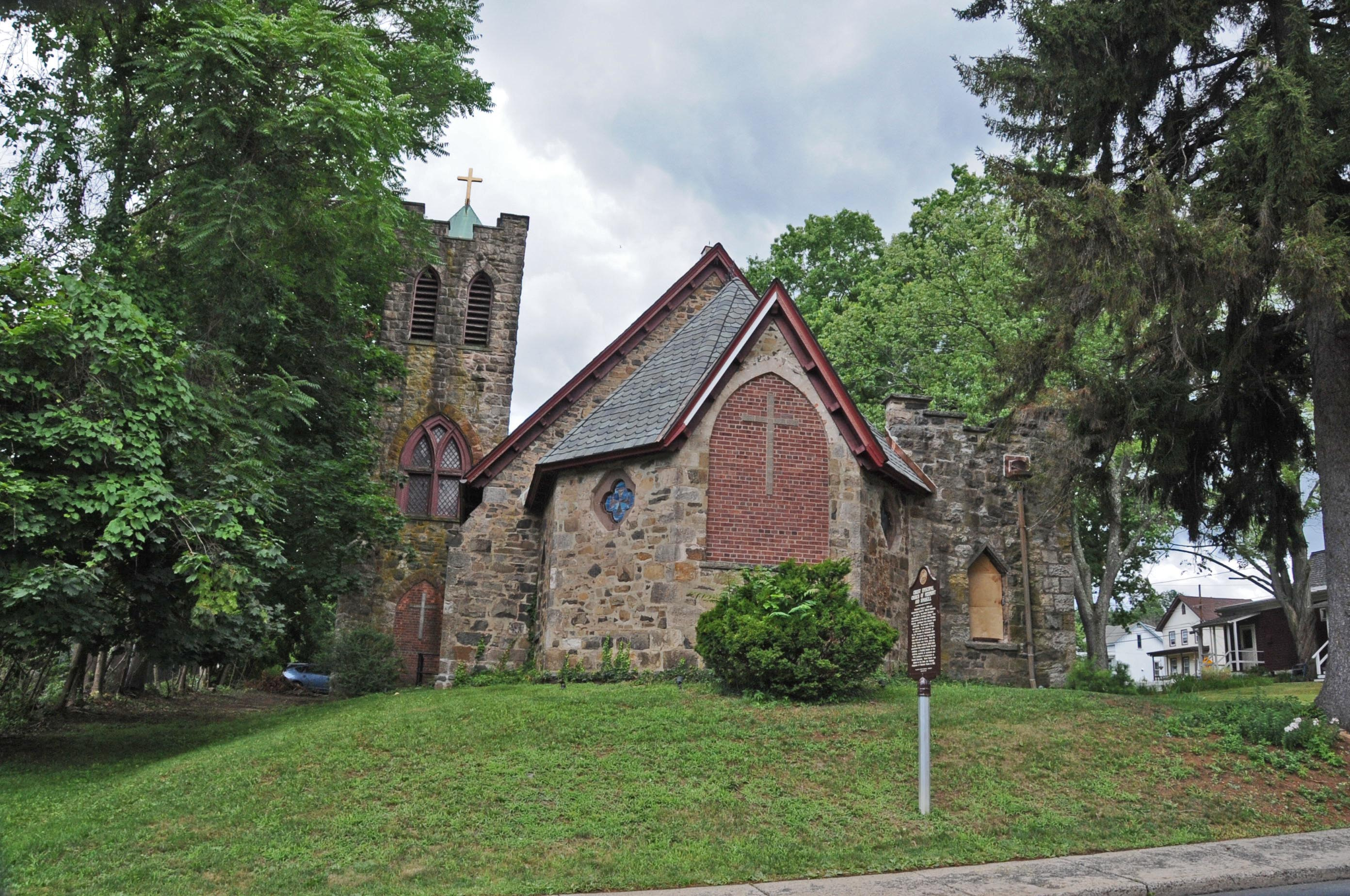
Christ Episcopal Church

- Hopson-Swan Estate – 1850
- John Moore's Mill – Site on Sparkill Creek below Route 9W Viaduct, Sparkill-In early 19th century John Moore, an African American, operated a saw and grist mill and from 1810 to 1815, a caning mill.
- Rockland Cemetery – 201 Kings Highway – The cemetery was created in 1847, by Eleazar Lord, author, educator and first president of the Erie Railroad. Buried here are veterans of the American Civil War and later wars; John Charles Frémont, the Pathfinder; engineer Henry Honychurch Gorringe, and local physician Dr. George A. Leitner.
- Saint Charles A.M.E. Zion Church – 432 Valentine Avenue – Built in 1865.
- Tallman Mountain State Park – Route 9W
- The Christ Episcopal Church of Piermont – 416 Valentine Avenue – designed by the Rev. Charles Babcock and built in 1865.
- Rockland Country Club
- St. Thomas Aquinas College
- Sparkill Creek

== See also ==
- List of census-designated places in New York
