= Tallman Mountain State Park =

State park in New York, United States

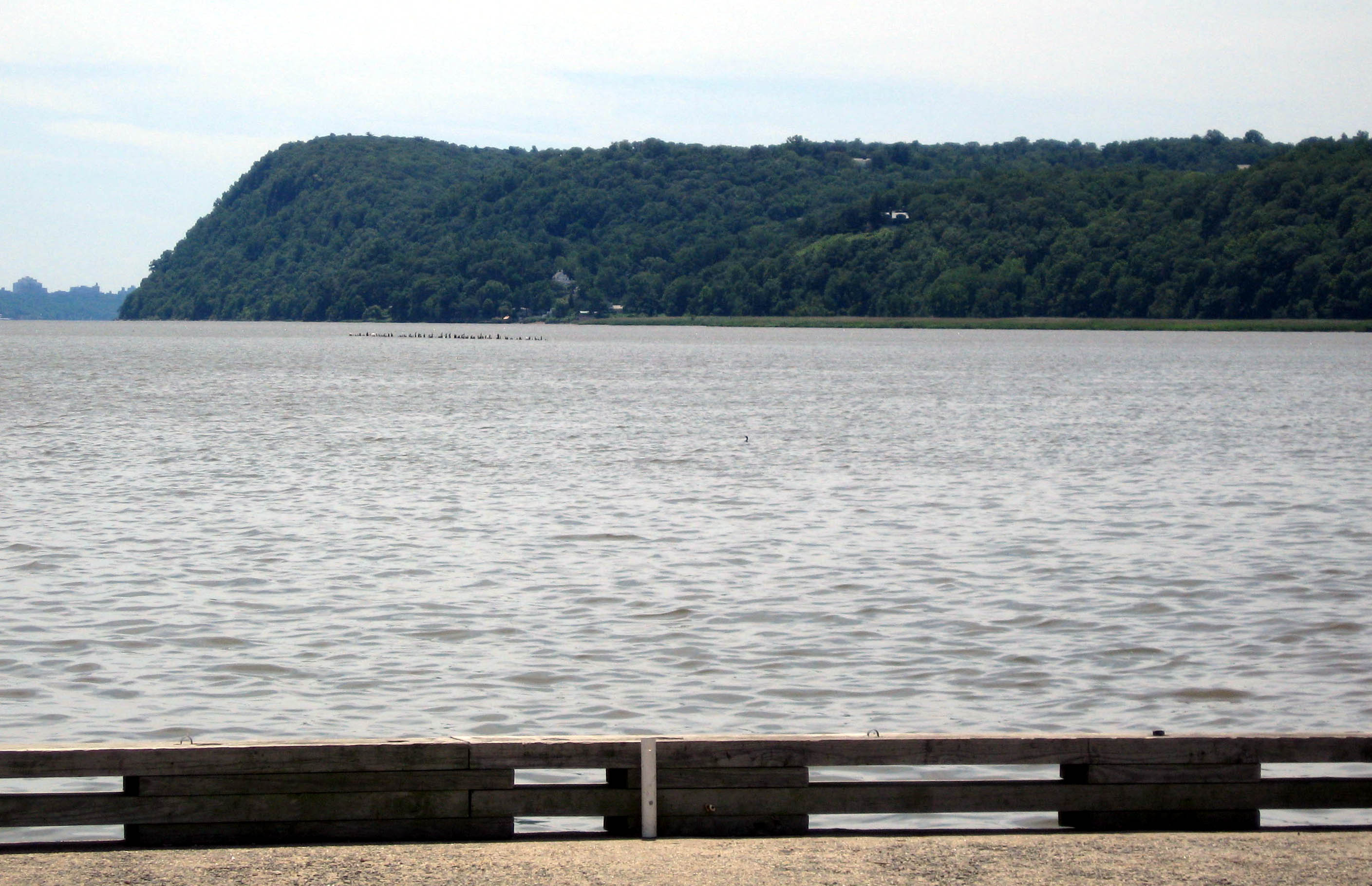
- Tallman Mountain State Park as seen from the end of a Piermont pier

- Location within New York
- Type: State park
- Location: Route 9W; Sparkill, New York
- Coordinates: 41°01′41″N 73°54′43″W
- Area: 687 acres (2.78 km^{2})
- Created: 1928
- Operator: Palisades Interstate Park Commission; New York State Office of Parks, Recreation and Historic Preservation
- Visitors: 293,615 (in 2014)
- Open: All year
- Website: Tallman Mountain State Park

Tallman Mountain State Park is a 687-acre (2.78 km^{2}) state park in Rockland County, New York, located adjacent to the Hudson River in the Town of Orangetown just south of Piermont. It is part of the Palisades Interstate Park System.

== History ==
Tallman Mountain State Park was formed in 1928 after the Palisades Interstate Park Commission moved to condemn the 164-acre (0.66 km^{2}) property of a quarry operator in an effort to preserve a portion of the Hudson River Palisades. Park facilities were improved in 1933 by Temporary Emergency Relief Administration workers, who constructed a swimming pool, recreation fields, and picnic areas. The park was expanded in 1942 with the addition of 542 adjacent acres (2.19 km^{2}).

== Description ==
Tallman Mountain State Park is a day-use only park containing five miles (8 km) of hiking trails, including sections of the Long Path and the Tallman Mountain Bike Path. The park also offers a running track, tennis courts, playing fields, cross-country skiing, and picnic areas. For an additional fee, visitors may also use a pool complex within the park, operated by a private vendor under an agreement with the Palisades Interstate Park Commission since summer 2016.

The park includes part of Piermont Marsh, which is included in the Hudson River National Estuarine Research Reserve.

== See also ==
- List of New York state parks
