= Cornell University College of Architecture, Art, and Planning =

Architecture school of Cornell University

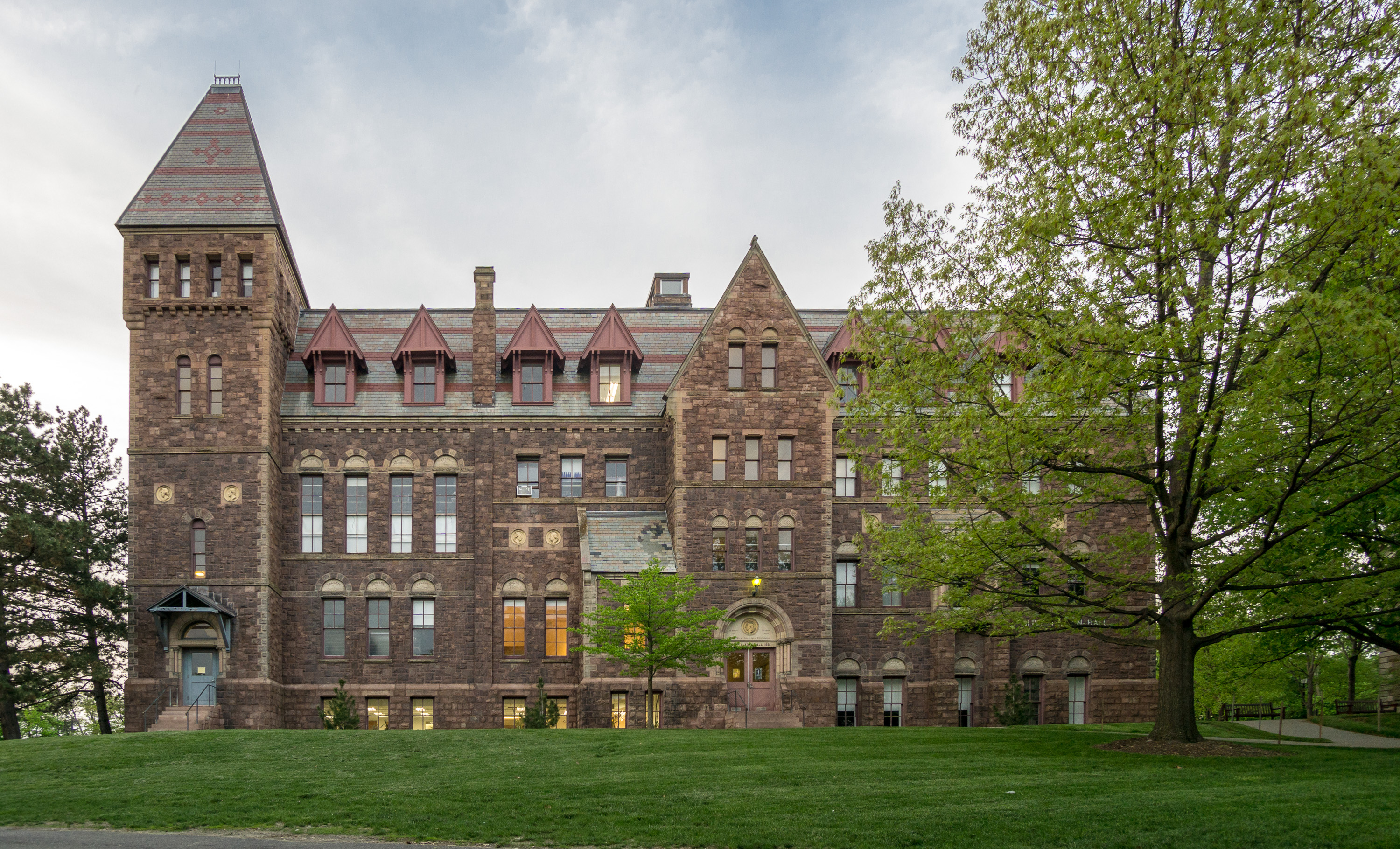
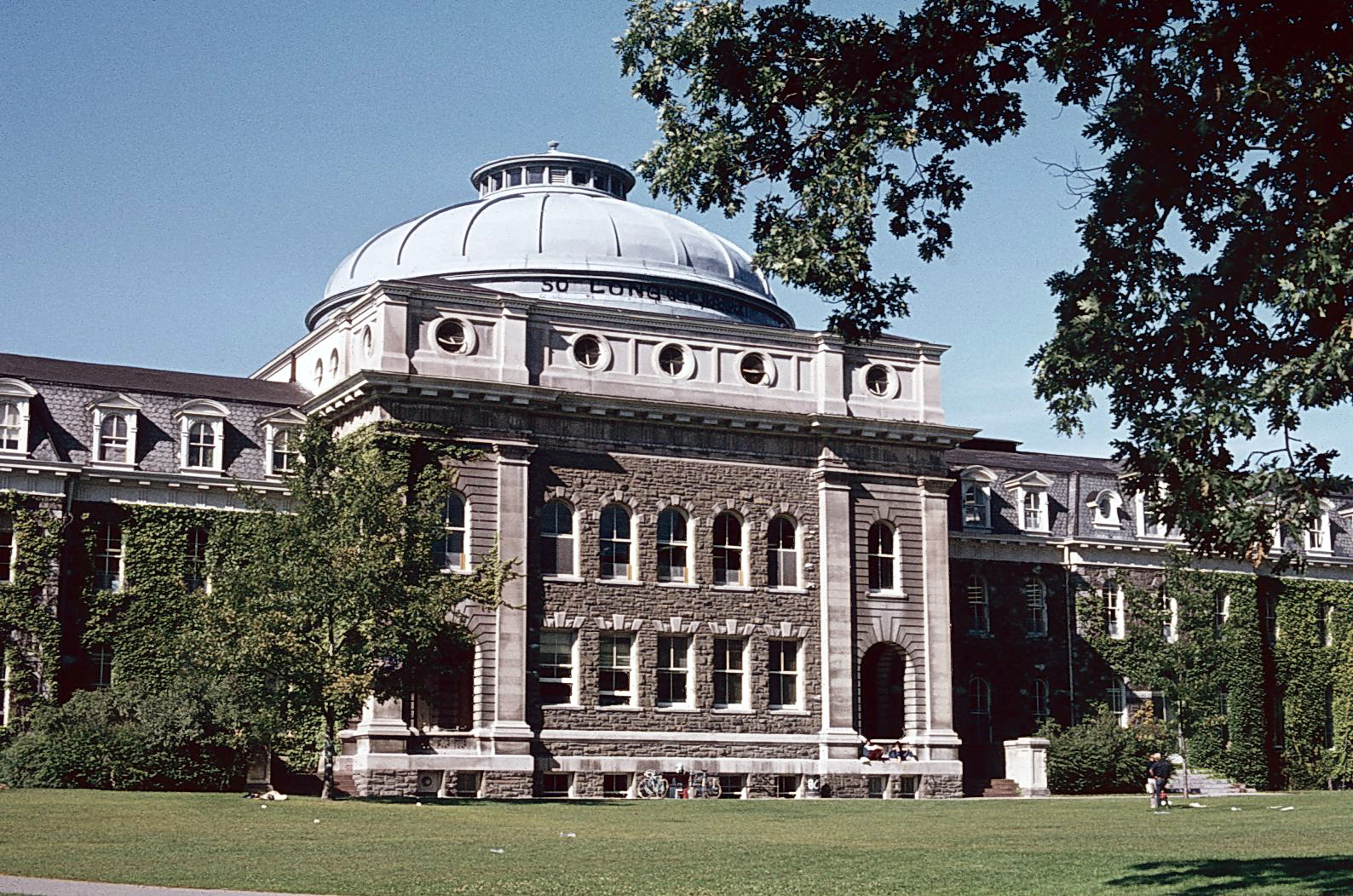
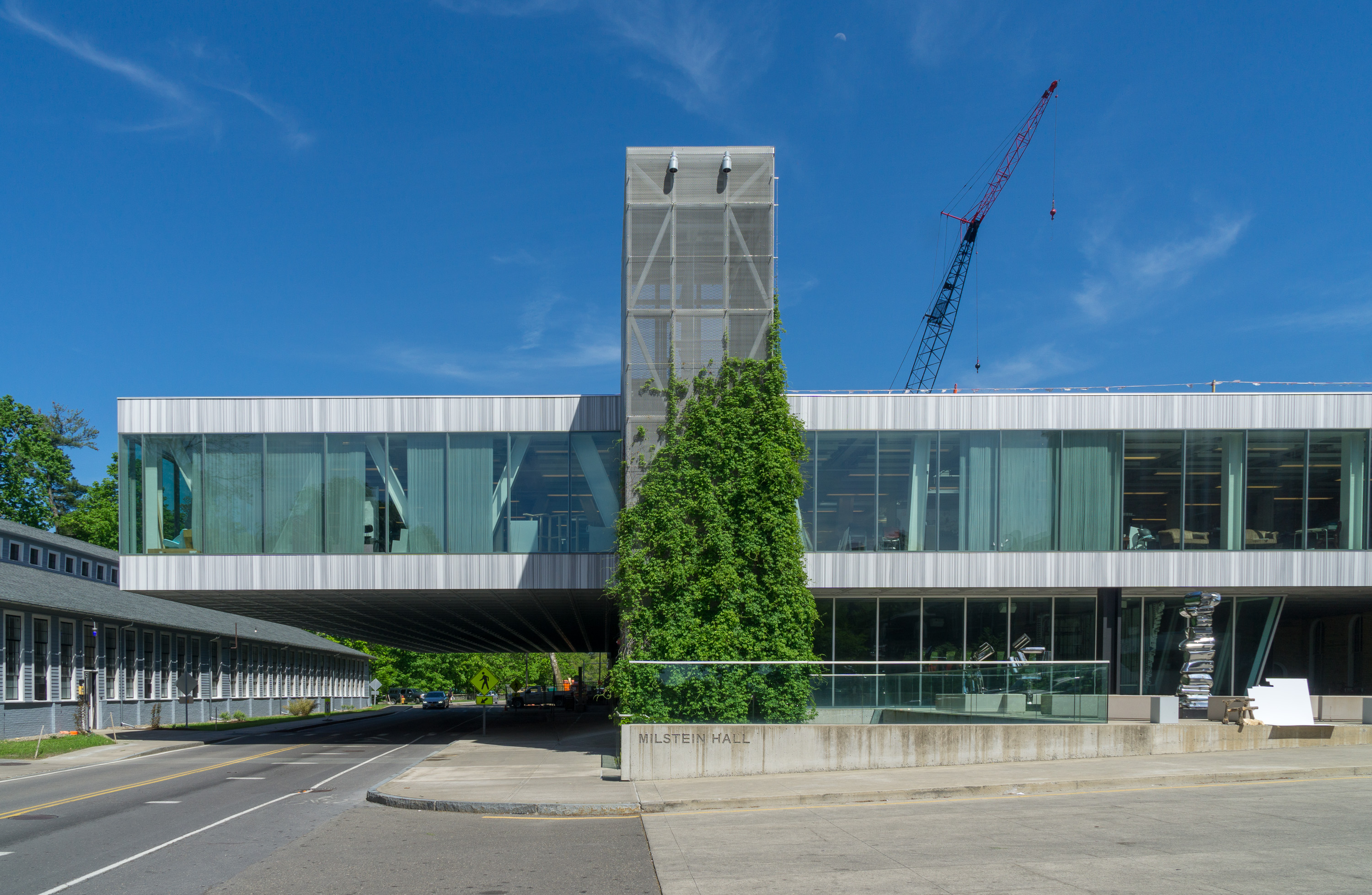
- Type: Private
- Established: 1871
- Founder: Olaf M Brauner
- Dean: J. Meejin Yoon
- Faculty: 56
- Undergraduates: 496
- Postgraduates: 257
- Location: Ithaca, New York, U.S. 42.4510911°N 76.48421459999997°W
- Website: aap.cornell.edu

The College of Architecture, Art, and Planning (AAP) is the school of architecture at Cornell University in Ithaca, New York. It offers 20 undergraduate and graduate degrees in five departments: architecture, art, urban planning, real estate, and design technology. Aside from its main campus in Ithaca, AAP offers programs in Rome, Italy and in New York City, New York.

AAP is the only department in the Ivy League to offer a Bachelor of Architecture degree. It has one of the largest endowments of any architecture program, including a $20 million donation from Cayuga County resident Ruth Price Thomas in 2002.

== Departments ==
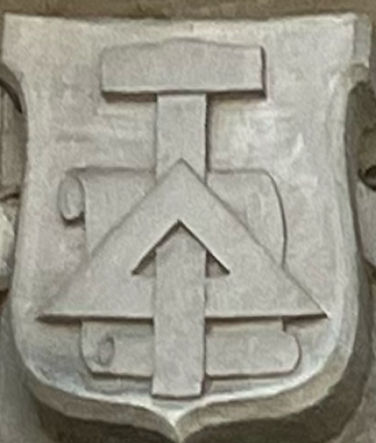
On the left, the shield of AAP as seen at the entrance of Willard Straight Hall. On the right, the banner of AAP used at commencement ceremonies.

The college is divided into five departments: Architecture, Art, City and Regional Planning, Real Estate, and Design Tech. In 2019, the college was the third most selective in the university, with an acceptance rate of 10.25%.

The Department of Architecture is one of the oldest architecture programs in the United States, offering NAAB-accredited degree programs that provide a foundation in the history, theory and practice of architecture. In addition to the Professional Bachelor of Architecture (B.Arch.) and undergraduate minor, the department offers the following graduate degrees: Professional Master of Architecture (M.Arch.); Post-Professional Master of Science (M.S.) in Advanced Architectural Design; and a Ph.D. in the History of Architecture and Urban Development. The department also offers M.S. degrees in Computer Graphics and Matter Design Computation.

The Department of Art offers four-year Bachelor of Fine Arts (B.F.A.) and two-year Master of Fine Arts (M.F.A.) degrees. The B.F.A. program requires students to complete coursework in various mediums of visual art, but provides opportunity to take classes outside of the department. The M.F.A. program encourages both interdisciplinary and medium-specific practices, depending on the interest of the student.

The Department of City and Regional Planning (CRP) is home to programs in planning, historic preservation, and urban and regional studies. Students work closely with a special thesis committee of their choosing that can include faculty members from across the university. CRP offers a Bachelor of Science in urban and regional studies (URS) that encompasses an interdisciplinary, liberal arts course of study focused on the forces that shape the social, economic, and political character and physical form of urban/suburban areas and their surrounding regions. CRP also offers an urban and regional studies minor for students not enrolled in the URS program. An accelerated M.R.P. degree option is available to graduates of the URS program. There are a variety of five-year dual degree options available to URS students in fields including engineering, landscape architecture, and natural and social sciences. Additionally, CRP offers an M.S. and Ph.D. in regional science, and an M.A. in historic preservation planning. Cornell was one of the first institutions in the country to offer preservation classes and is internationally recognized as a leader in the field.

AAP also participates in the Baker Program in Real Estate, a graduate program held in partnership with Cornell's SC Johnson College of Business and School of Hotel Administration. The Hotel School houses the Baker Program and offers a minor in real estate for undergraduates. Students earning a bachelor's degree at the Hotel School can focus their studies on the design of hospitality and foodservice facilities or the creation of new hotels and restaurants.

== History ==
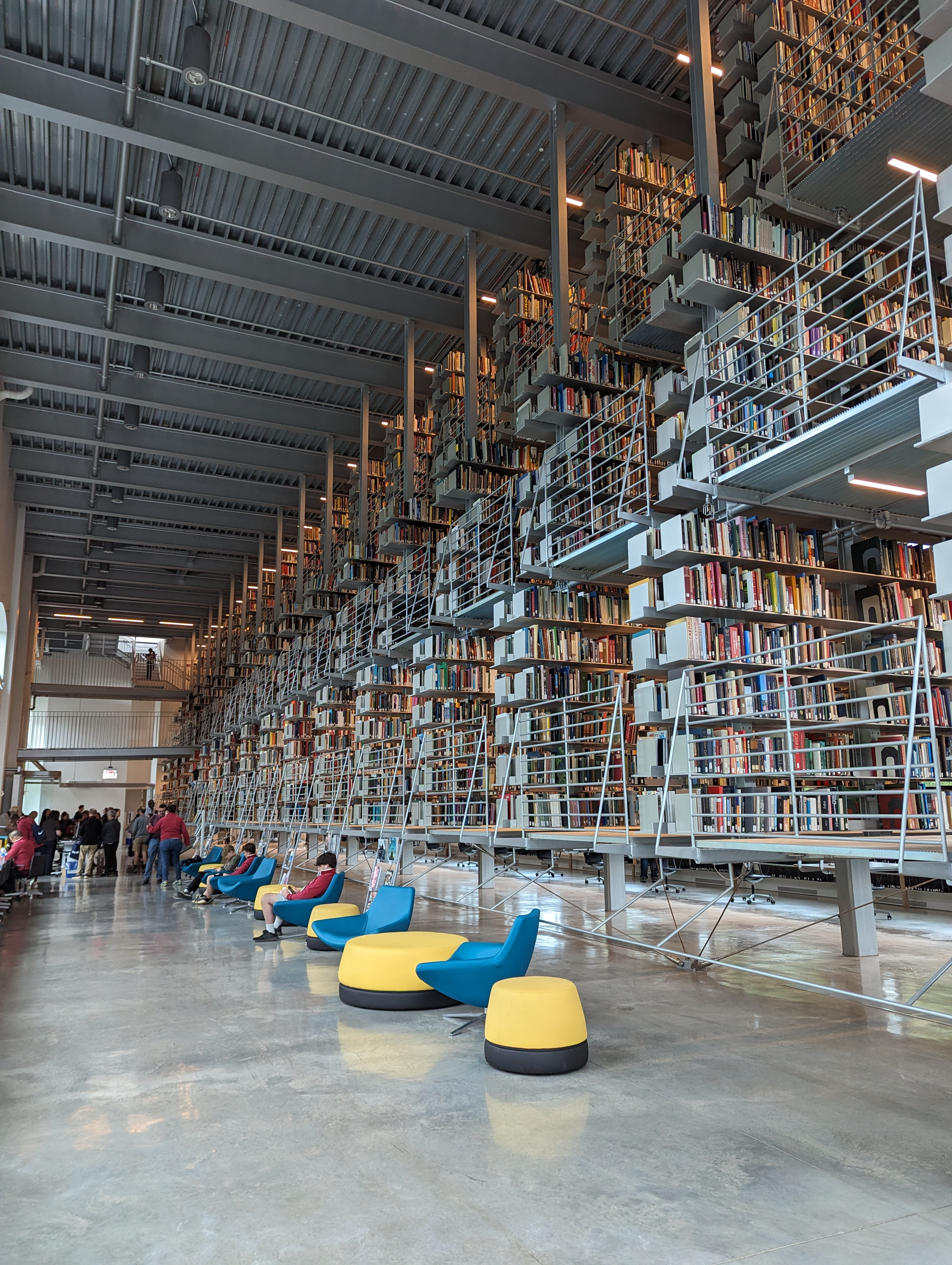
the Mui Ho Fine Arts Library in Rand Hall houses the collection of books pertinent to the studies at AAP

In the period following the establishment of Cornell University, a proposal was put forth by President A.D. White to the university’s board of trustees advocating for the creation of an architectural program. White argued that “Outside of the great metropolitan cities, there are very few architects who are really instructed in their profession [in America].” Consequently, Cornell University's architecture department was established in 1871 as the School of Architecture with the hiring of architect Charles Babcock as the first professor. It became the first university to offer a four-year course of study in architecture in the United States. By 1896, the College of Architecture expanded its curriculum to include courses in drawing, painting, and sculpture. In 1921, an art department was officially incorporated. The introduction of a City and Regional Planning program took place in 1935. In 1967 the College of Architecture became the College of Architecture, Art, and Planning.

AAP is currently the smallest of Cornell's seven undergraduate colleges and schools, with an undergraduate enrollment of 496 and a faculty of 56.

=== Deans ===
Dean	Tenure	Career
Charles Babcock	1871–1896	Architect
Alexander Trowbridge	1896–1901	Architect
John V. Van Pelt	1902–1903	Architectural historian
Clarence Martin	1904–1918	Architect
Francke Huntington Bosworth	1919–1926	Architect
George Young, Jr.	1927–1938	Architect
Gilmore Clarke	1939–1950	Landscape architect
Thomas W. Mackesey	1951–1959	Urban planner
Burnham Kelly	1960–1970	Urban planner
Kermit C. Parsons	1971–1979	Architect and urban planner
Jason Seley	1980–1983	Sculptor
Ian Stewart	1983–1984 (interim)	Urban planner
William McMinn	1984–1996	Architect
Stanley Bowman	1996 (interim)	Artist
Anthony Vidler	1997–1998	Architectural historian
Porus Olpadwala	1999–2004	Urban planner
Mohsen Mostafavi	2004–2007	Architect
W. Stanley Taft	2008 (interim)	Artist
Kent Kleinman	2008–2018	Architect
Kieran Donaghy	2018 (interim)	Urban planner
J. Meejin Yoon	2019–present	Architect

== Facilities ==
Ithaca: Main Campus New York City: NYC Campus Rome: Palazzo Santacroce

=== AAP campuses ===
- Main campus, Cornell University, Ithaca/NY, United States
- AAP NYC, 26 Broadway, New York City/NY, United States
- Cornell in Rome at Palazzo Santacroce, Rome, Italy

1. Sibley Hall; 2. Milstein Hall; 3. Rand Hall; 4. Tjaden Hall; 5. Foundry

The college occupies four buildings on the northern end of the Arts Quad. Located in Sibley Hall are offices for the City and Regional Planning and Architecture departments, the Cornell in Rome program, and the Office of the Dean. The Green Dragon Cafe and student lounge is located in the basement.

Olive Tjaden Hall is used by the Department of Art. It houses painting, drawing, photography and lithography studios, the Art department main office and faculty offices. Rand Hall housed studios and classrooms of the Department of Architecture until 2018 and is being renovated to house the Fine Arts Library and AAP shops. In 2011, the Fine Arts Library was moved from the Sibley Hall Dome to the top floor of Rand Hall, following a reorganization coinciding with the opening of adjacent Milstein Hall.

Directly behind Sibley, the OMA/Rem Koolhaas and Shohei Shigematsu-designed Milstein Hall (named after Paul Milstein) is a prominent cantilevered structure housing studio space that extends over University Avenue. The LEED-certified building features a stepped auditorium space for presentations and meetings, crit space, galleries, and a sunken garden. The unfinished building opened to students in the fall of 2011, with the ceremonial completion scheduled the following spring. In 2013, Milstein Hall was one of 11 buildings in the United States and Canada to receive an Honor Award for architectural design from the American Institute of Architects.

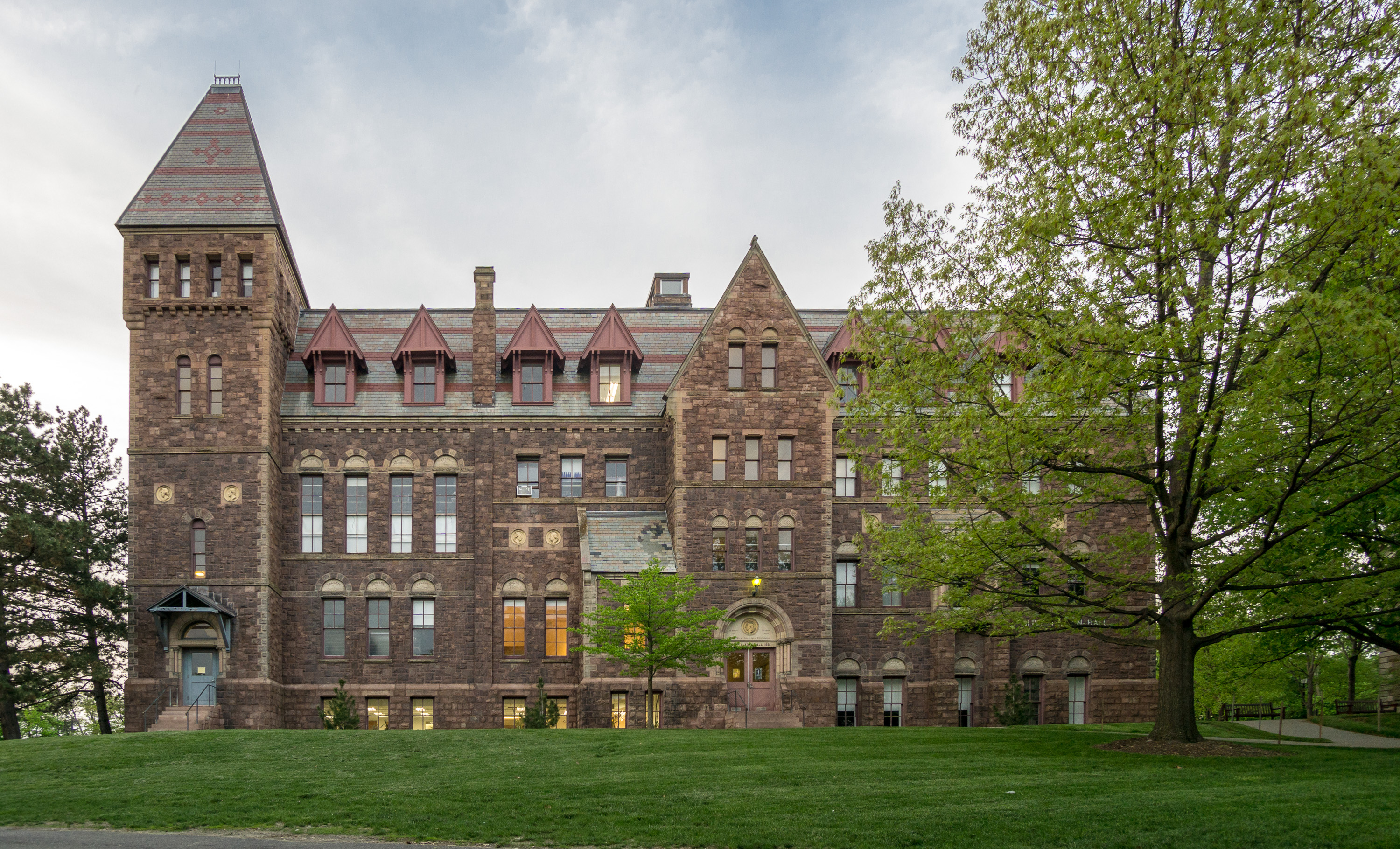
Tjaden Hall

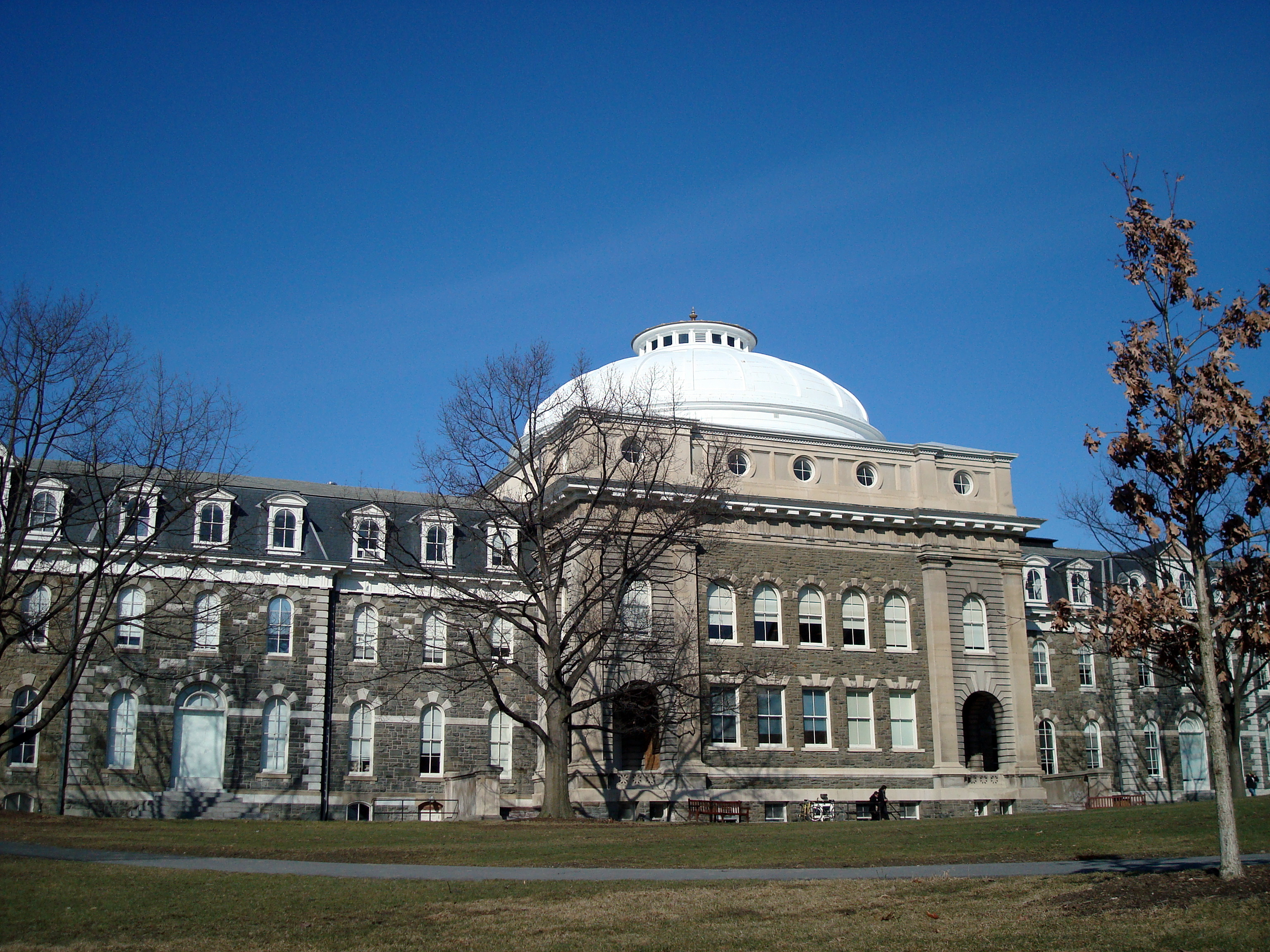
Sibley Hall

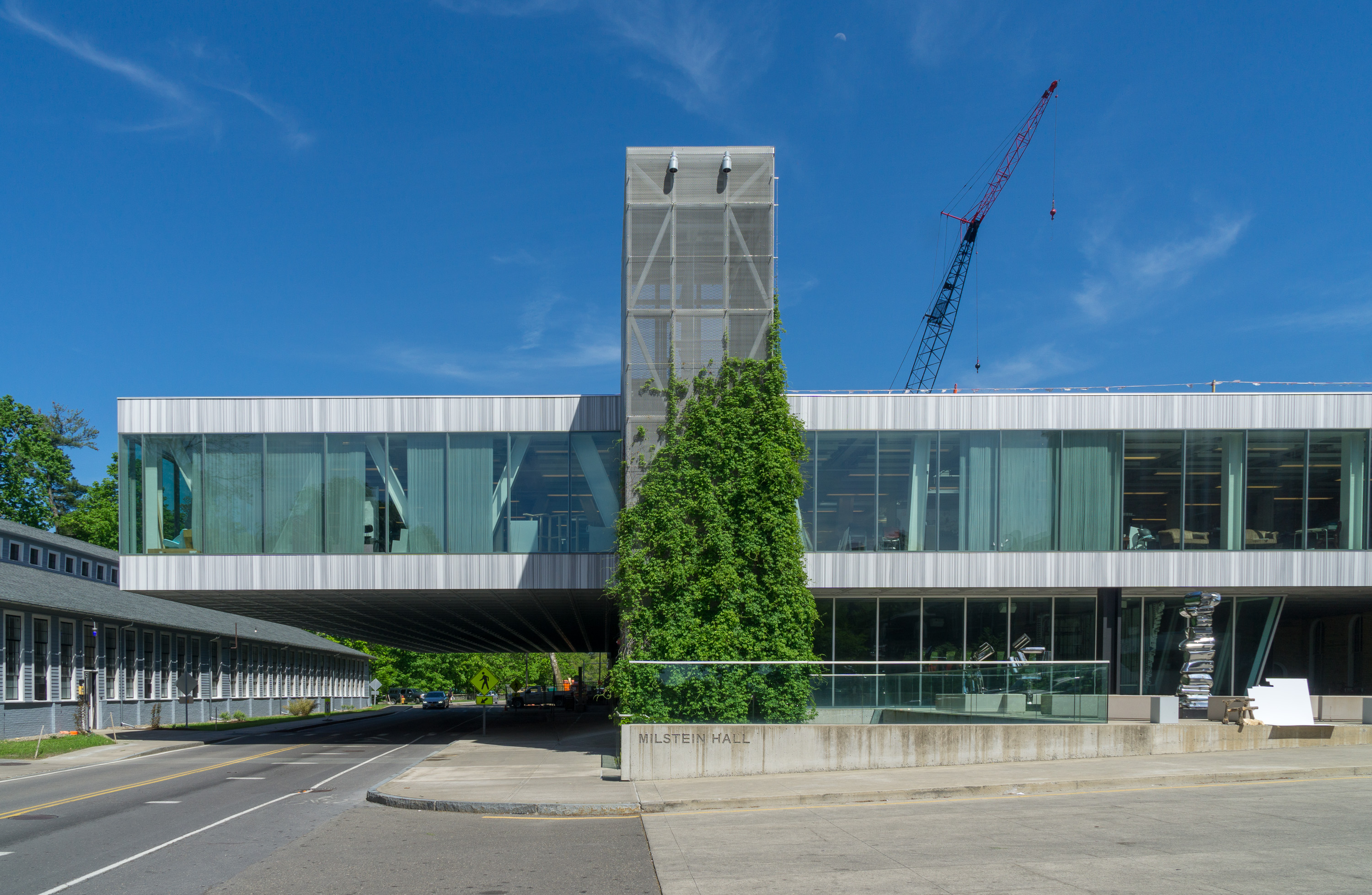
Milstein Hall

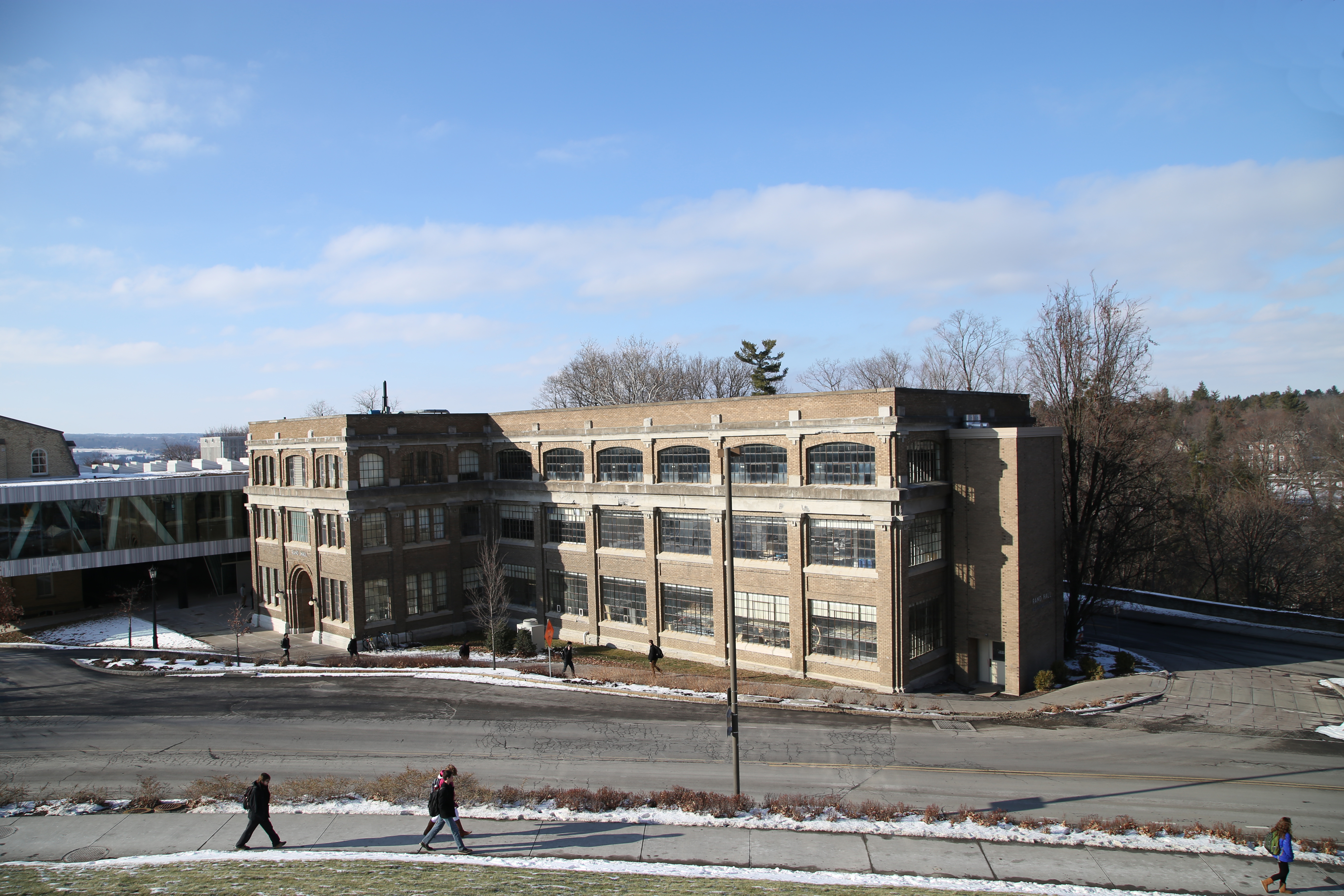
Rand Hall

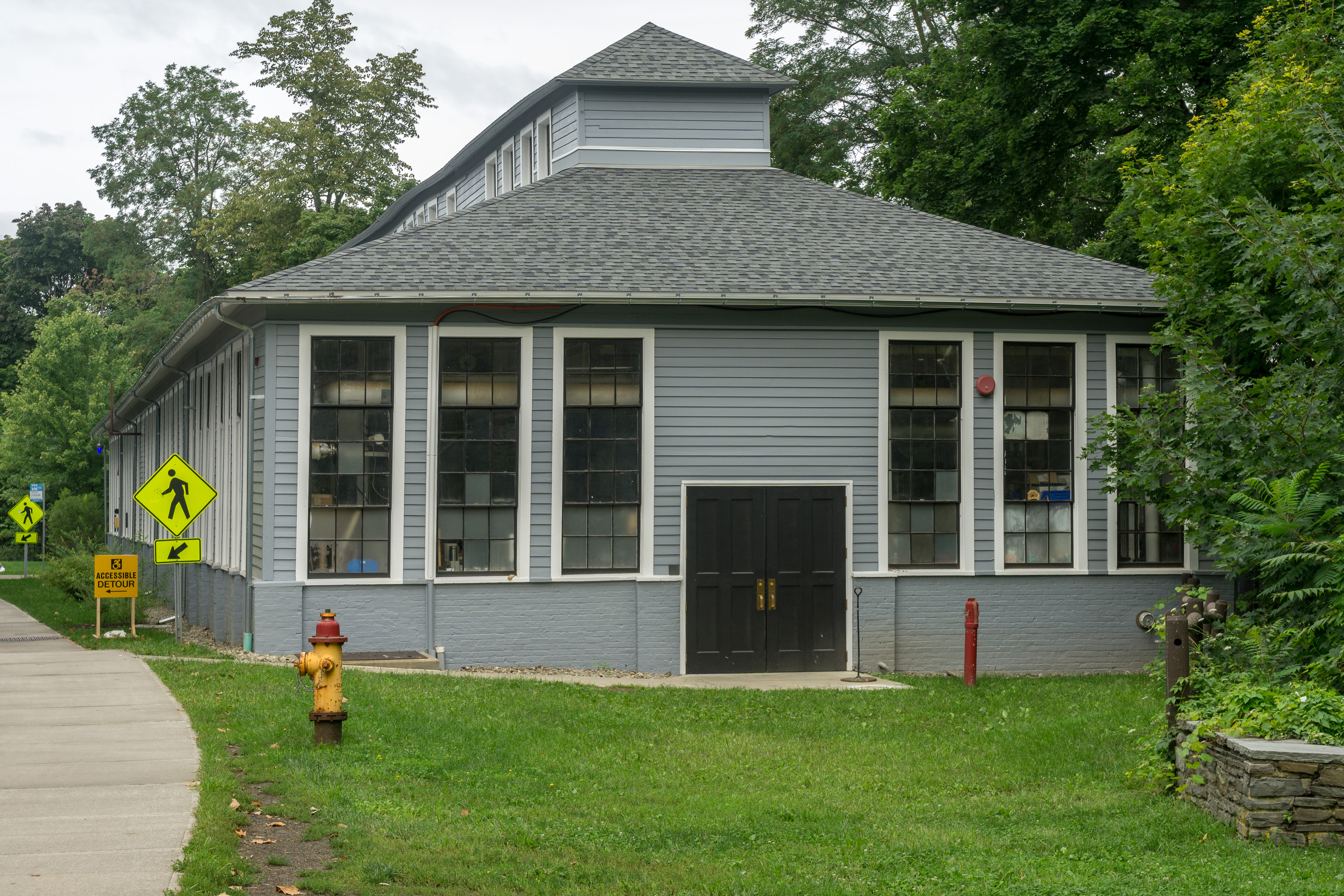
The Foundry

== Off-campus programs and facilities ==
The College of Architecture, Art, and Planning runs several off-campus programs. The most long standing is the Cornell in Rome, in which students from all three disciplines, as well as Cornell students from outside AAP, spend one semester in Rome studying architecture, art, urban planning, and Italian language, history, and culture. Classes are taught both by Cornell professors and Rome-based faculty. The program is housed at the 17th-century Palazzo Santacroce in the historic center of Rome. The Department of Planning also offers a winter program on sustainability in Panama, and a summer program on urban development in Brazil.

In 2006, the college opened AAP NYC, a 5,500-square-foot (510 m^{2}) facility near Union Square in New York City, as a work and display space as well as a venue for Cornell events. AAP students can choose to spend one semester at AAP NYC, where they take studio and other classes. Students are also offered the option to intern at an architecture firm in the city.

== Rankings ==
=== Undergraduate program ===
The journal DesignIntelligence has consistently ranked Cornell's undergraduate architecture program as No. 1 in the nation in its annual "America's Best Architecture & Design Schools" issue.

Year	DesignIntelligence ranking
2020	1st
2019	1st
2018	1st
2017	1st
2016	1st
2015	1st
2014	2nd
2013	1st
2012	1st
2011	1st
2010	1st
2009	1st
2008	2nd
2007	1st

*(T) denotes tie

=== Graduate program ===
As of 2016, the program's ten-year average ranking, places it 5th, overall, on DesignIntelligence's ranking of programs accredited by the National Architectural Accrediting Board.

Additionally, DesignIntelligence's ten-year median ranking also ranks the program 5th.

Year	DesignIntelligence ranking
2020	5th
2019	4th
2018	3rd
2017	2nd
2016	2nd
2015	5th
2014	5th
2013	5th
2012	6th (T)
2011	6th
2010	7th
2009	6th
2008	3rd (T)
2007	6th
2006	NR

*(T) denotes tie

== Notable Alumni and Faculty ==
Among the college's notable alumni are architects Richard Meier (B.Arch. '56), designer of the Getty Center in Los Angeles, and Peter Eisenman (B.Arch. '55), founder of the Institute for Architecture and Urban Studies in New York City; artists Charles Ginnever (M.F.A. '59), Louise Lawler (B.F.A. '69), Susan Rothenberg (B.F.A. '67) and James Siena (B.F.A. '79); architect and planner Edmund Bacon (B.Arch. '32), and planners Paul Farmer (M.R.P. '71), Norman Krumholz (M.R.P. '65), and Robert Mier (M.R.P. '73, Ph.D. '75).

=== Current faculty ===
Notable faculty currently in the college include Esra Akcan, Michael Ashkin, Milton S. F. Curry, Donald P. Greenberg, Florian Idenburg, Caroline O'Donnell, Keith Obadike, Paul Ramirez Jonas, and Jenny Sabin.

=== Emeritus faculty ===
- Lourdes Beneria
- John F. Forester
- Victor Kord
- Kay WalkingStick

=== Former faculty ===
- Jacqueline Livingston – photographer
- Colin Rowe – architectural historian, critic, theoretician
- Oswald Mathias Ungers – architect and architectural theorist
