= Grand View-on-Hudson, New York =

- Village
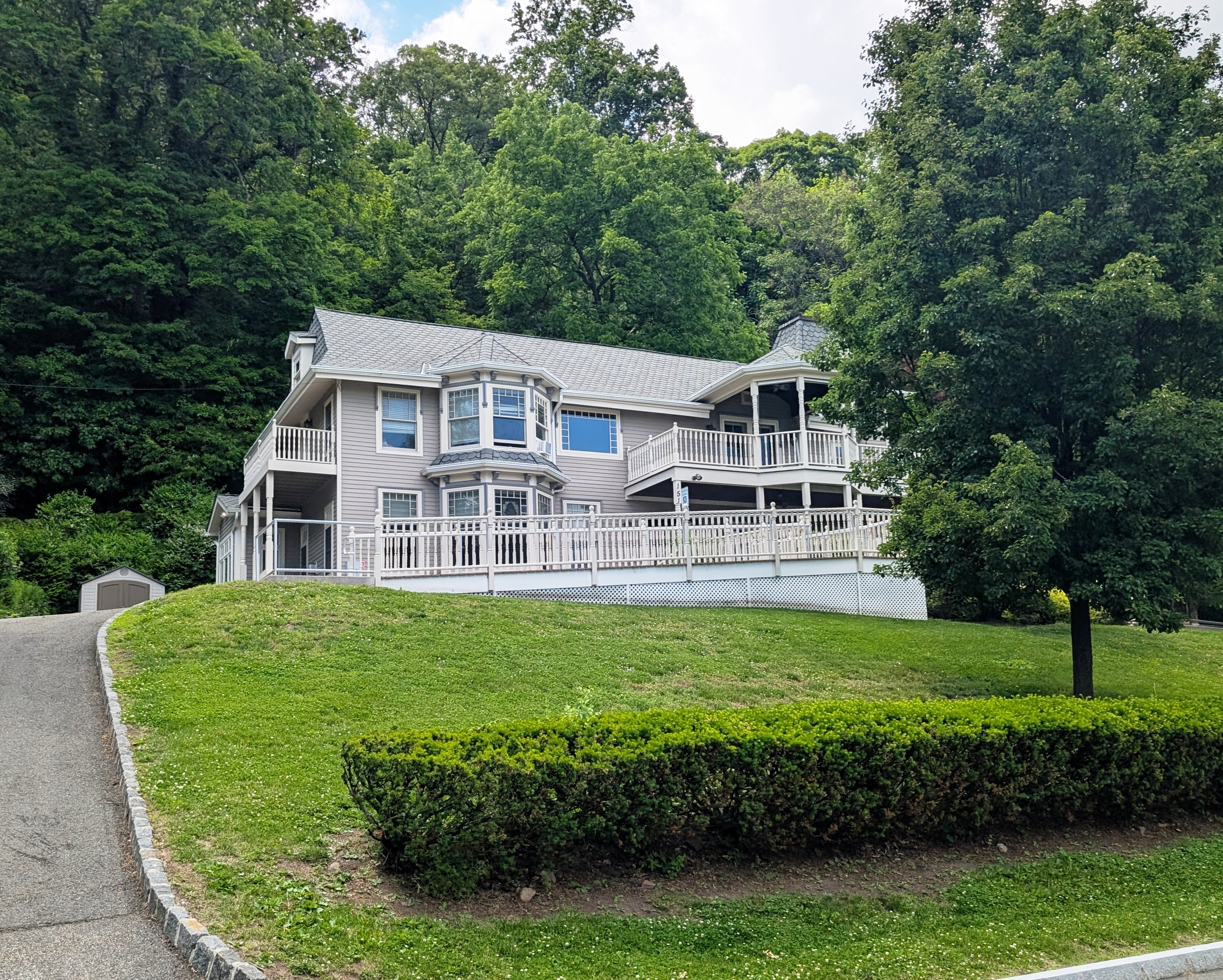
- Village Hall

- Location in Rockland County and the state of New York.

- Location within the state of New York
- Coordinates: 41°4′6″N 73°55′17″W
- Country: United States
- State: New York
- County: Rockland
- Town: Orangetown
- Incorporated: 1918

Government
  - Mayor: Patricia Gunning
  - Deputy Mayor: Joseph Abrams
  - Trustees: Jonathan Bell, Jane Lattes, and Catherine Whitney

Area
  - Total: 0.17 sq mi (0.45 km^{2})
  - Land: 0.17 sq mi (0.45 km^{2})
  - Water: 0 sq mi (0.00 km^{2})
- Elevation: 43 ft (13 m)

Population (2020)
  - Total: 246
  - Density: 1,409.9/sq mi (544.38/km^{2})
- Time zone: UTC-5 (Eastern (EST))
  - Summer (DST): UTC-4 (EDT)
- ZIP code: 10960
- Area code: 845
- FIPS code: 36-29872
- GNIS feature ID: 0951486
- Website: www.gvoh-ny.gov

Grand View-on-Hudson is a village incorporated in 1918 in the town of Orangetown in Rockland County, New York, United States. It is located north of Piermont, east of Orangeburg, south of South Nyack, and west of the Hudson River. As of the 2020 census, Grand View-on-Hudson had a population of 246. The name is derived from the scenic view from its location.

== Geography ==
Grand View-on-Hudson is located at 41°4′6″N 73°55′17″W (41.068352, -73.921298).

According to the United States Census Bureau, the village has a total area of 0.2 square miles (0.52 km^{2}), all land.

The village lies on the west bank of the Hudson River.

== Demographics ==
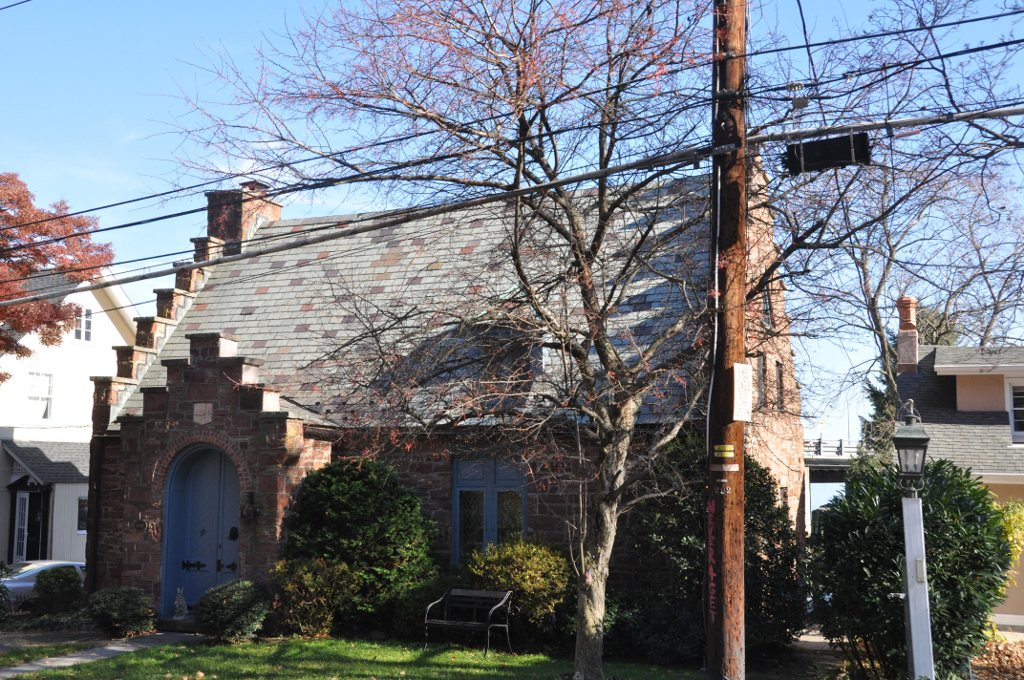
Wayside Chapel

Historical population
Census	Pop.	Note	%±
1910	368		—
1920	175		−52.4%
1930	252		44.0%
1940	588		133.3%
1950	302		−48.6%
1960	330		9.3%
1970	325		−1.5%
1980	312		−4.0%
1990	271		−13.1%
2000	284		4.8%
2010	285		0.4%
2020	246		−13.7%
U.S. Decennial Census

At the 2000 census there were 284 people, 132 households, and 81 families in the village. The population density was 1,699.1 inhabitants per square mile (656.0/km^{2}). There were 138 housing units at an average density of 825.6 per square mile (318.8/km^{2}). The racial makeup of the village was 93.66% White, 0.35% African American, 3.87% Asian, and 2.11% from two or more races. Hispanic or Latino of any race were 1.41%.

Of the 132 households 24.2% had children under the age of 18 living with them, 53.8% were married couples living together, 7.6% had a female householder with no husband present, and 38.6% were non-families. 26.5% of households were one person and 13.6% were one person aged 65 or older. The average household size was 2.15 and the average family size was 2.60.

The age distribution was 15.8% under the age of 18, 2.1% from 18 to 24, 21.5% from 25 to 44, 39.4% from 45 to 64, and 21.1% 65 or older. The median age was 49 years. For every 100 females, there were 93.2 males. For every 100 females age 18 and over, there were 91.2 males.

The median household income was $130,747 and the median family income was $157,500. Males had a median income of $97,269 versus $77,403 for females. The per capita income for the village was $84,707. None of the families and 1.4% of the population were living below the poverty line.

== Landmark ==
- Former Wayside Chapel Historic Chapel 1867-1869 (NRHP)

== Notable people ==
- Stephen Baldwin
- Thomas Berger
- Betty Friedan
- Toni Morrison
- Charles Samuels
- Matthew Winkler
- Greg Wyatt

== In popular culture ==
A fictionalized version of the town appeared in the paranormal television series Ghost Whisperer, which aired from 2005 to 2010. Creator John Gray grew up in Brooklyn, New York, which is not far from the actual Grand View-On-Hudson, west of the Hudson River. Piermont is often referenced in episodes as a neighboring town, which is accurate to real life. In the series, Professor Rick Payne worked at the fictional "Rockland University"; Grand-View-On-Hudson is located in Rockland County, New York.
