= Milton S. F. Curry =

American professor of architecture

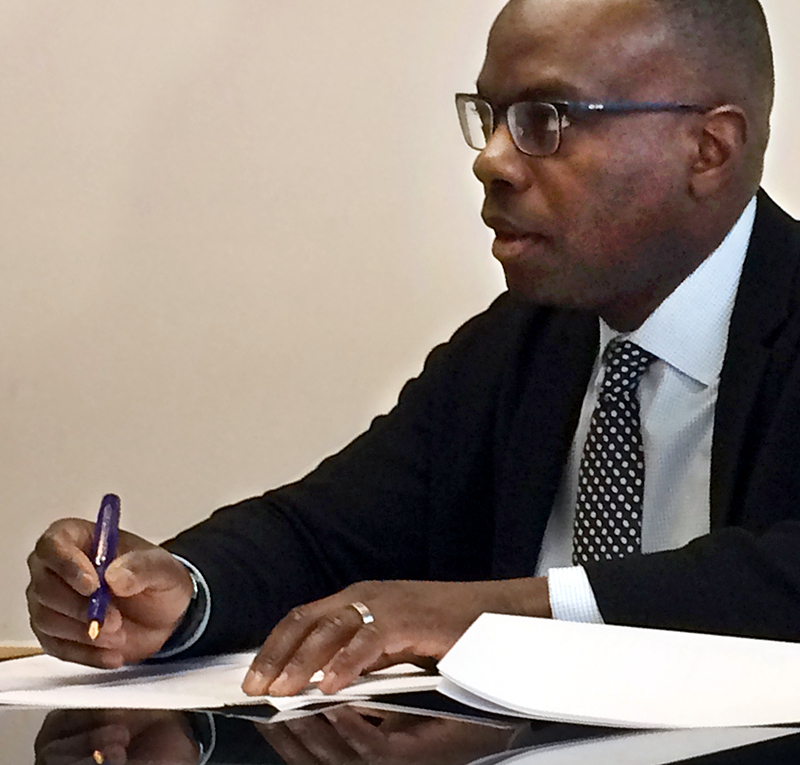
- Milton S. F. Curry, Dean of the USC School of Architecture
- Born: United States
- Known for: Architecture, cultural theory
- Title: Dean
- Spouse: Reighan A. Gillam

Academic work
- Discipline: Architecture
- Institutions: University of Southern California, Cornell University, Harvard University Graduate School of Design, Arizona State University

Milton S. F. Curry is an American professor of architecture who became Dean of the USC School of Architecture at the University of Southern California on July 1, 2017. Curry joined USC after serving as Associate Dean for academic affairs and strategic initiatives of the University of Michigan Taubman College of Architecture and Urban Planning.

== Early career ==
Curry completed a Bachelor of Architecture degree at Cornell University and a Master of Architecture degree (architecture theory) at Harvard Graduate School of Design.

He joined Arizona State University after instructing the Harvard University's Career Discovery program in 1991. Curry was an assistant professor of architecture at ASU from 1992 to 1995, and an assistant professor at the Cornell University Department of Architecture, where he received tenure in 2002. He was affiliated with Cornell Center for the Study of Inequality, and directed Cornell Council for the Arts from 2002 to 2008. At CCA, he initiated CCA X DesignGroup to facilitate faculty-undergraduate research, CCA Installations to commission public arts and CCA Cornell Public to connect Cornell community with prominent figures in the art industry.

In 2010, he became an associate professor with tenure at the University of Michigan. He has also taught at Harvard University Graduate School of Design, where he directed a graduate design studio in 1999. Curry has worked as a design professional with the Studio Museum in New York and designed several speculative real estate and architectural projects.

== Later career ==
Curry founded Appendx Journal in 1993, focusing on interdisciplinary discussions of race and culture. In 2008, Curry founded CriticalProductive Journal, focused on scholarship and creative work on architecture, urbanism and cultural theory. Curry has coordinated graduate and undergraduate design studios at all levels, and has taught seminars on subjects ranging from architecture and cultural theory to urbanism and housing. At the University of Michigan, Curry directed the Michigan/Mellon Project on Egalitarianism and the Metropolis, focused on urbanization.

Curry became Dean of the USC School of Architecture and the holder of the Della and Harry MacDonald Dean's Chair in Architecture on July 1, 2017. His pedagogy under his role of School's dean focuses on the synergies between architecture, urbanism and other humanities studies.

== Published works ==
Edited Volumes:

- Appendx Journal, Cambridge, MA; Distributed by Rizzoli, Harvard University GSD. 1993–1999.
- CriticalProductive Journal
