= Former Wayside Chapel =

- U.S. National Register of Historic Places
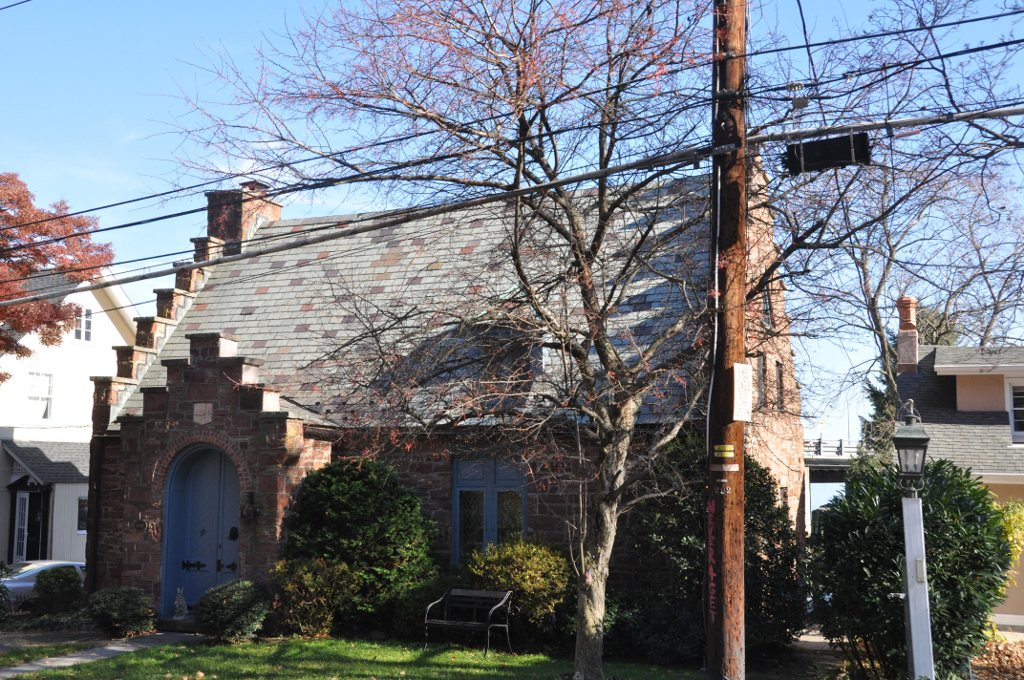

- Location within New York Location within the United States
- Location: 24 River Rd., Grand View-on-Hudson, New York
- Coordinates: 41°4′24″N 73°55′14″W
- Area: less than one acre
- Built: 1867
- Architect: Atwood, Daniel T.
- Architectural style: Flemish Revival
- NRHP reference No.: 00000346
- Added to NRHP: April 6, 2000

The Former Wayside Chapel is a historic chapel at 24 River Road in Grand View-on-Hudson, Rockland County, New York. The Flemish Revival building was constructed in 1867–1869 and is a simple, rectangular building measuring 26 by 40 feet (7.9 by 12.2 m). It is built of brownstone laid in uncoursed rows and features a steeply pitched slate-covered roof.

It was listed on the National Register of Historic Places in 2000.
