= Olive Frances Tjaden =

American architect

Olive Tjaden
- Born: November 24, 1904; New Utrecht, New York, U.S.
- Died: March 15, 1997 (aged 92); Fort Lauderdale, Florida, U.S.
- Education: Cornell University
- Occupation: Architect
- Spouses: Carl G. Johnson; Roswell Van Sickle
- Practice: Gustav Erda, Thomas W. Lamb, & Harrison G. Weisman (1925-28) Olive Tjaden, Architect (principal)

Olive Frances Tjaden (/ˈtʃɑːdən/; November 24, 1904 – March 15, 1997) was a pioneering woman architect, one of the first female architects of her generation.

== Early life and education ==
Born November 24, 1904 in New Utrecht, New York. Her father was John G. Tjaden, a structural engineer.

Tjaden graduated from Jamaica High School at the age of 15. Rejected from Columbia University's architectural program because she was too young, Tjaden waited a year to meet the age requirements for Cornell University's School of Architecture. Tjaden completed the five-year course in four years and graduated from Cornell University in 1925 with a bachelor's degree in architecture at the age of 19. She was the only woman architect in her graduating class.

== Career ==
In 1929, at the age of 24, Tjaden became the youngest registered architect in New York State. In 1938, she became the first woman admitted to the Brooklyn Chapter of the American Institute of Architects and for many years was the only female member of the organization. She specialized in residential architecture, and was chosen to design a home for the 1939 World's Fair. She designed more than two thousand buildings in her career.

On the recommendation of a Cornell dean, Tjaden was hired by a Mineola, New York, architecture firm and began designing “distinctive homes for people of both significant and moderate means.” From the 1920s to 1940s, Tjaden supervised the design of more than 400 homes in the Garden City area of Long Island, New York. Tjaden's designs included flourishes such as formal breakfast rooms and sweeping staircases. One of her most admired elements was her use of stained glass windows, particularly a colorful peacock door designed by her and constructed in England. The homes were meant to sell for around $12,000. According to Nassau County Historical Society member Millicent Vollono “She would sometimes do a whole block of homes using five or six kinds of styles. When you go through those neighborhoods now, the homes look different, but they all fit together.”

A Tudor mansion Tjaden designed in Woodmere, New York, for a distiller was featured in a 1935 edition of “Good Housekeeping” magazine.

Tjaden's former home on 11th Street in Garden City is marked with a weather vane representing her career- a young woman holding a caliper and sitting astride a T-square. Tjaden often hosted social events for women at her home and the house served as an advertisement for her work.

In 1943, she moved to Florida to capitalize on the building boom of the era. Once in Florida she ceased working on individual homes, but wrote a column for an architectural journal and designed garden apartments. She also served as program director and member of the board for the Museum of Fine Arts in Fort Lauderdale.

== Personal life and legacy ==
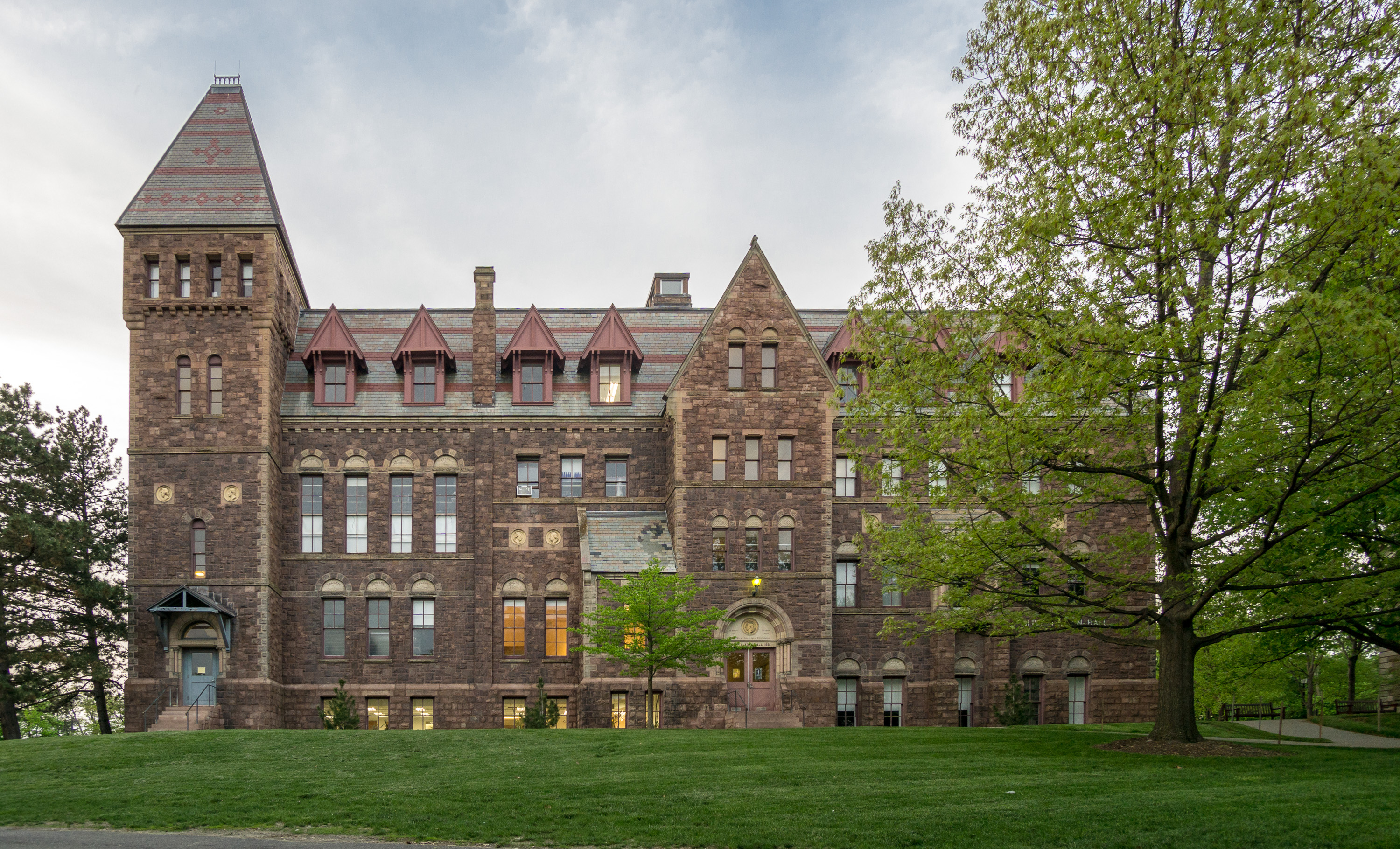
Olive Tjaden Hall, part of the Cornell University College of Architecture, Art, and Planning

Tjaden married Carl G. Johnson of Fort Lauderdale, Florida, in 1945. At the time, Tjaden was reported to live in Garden City, New York.

Tjaden died at the age of 92 and left most of her $12 million estate to Cornell. A building housing part of Cornell's College of Architecture, Art and Planning was named in her honor in 1981.
