= Rand Hall =

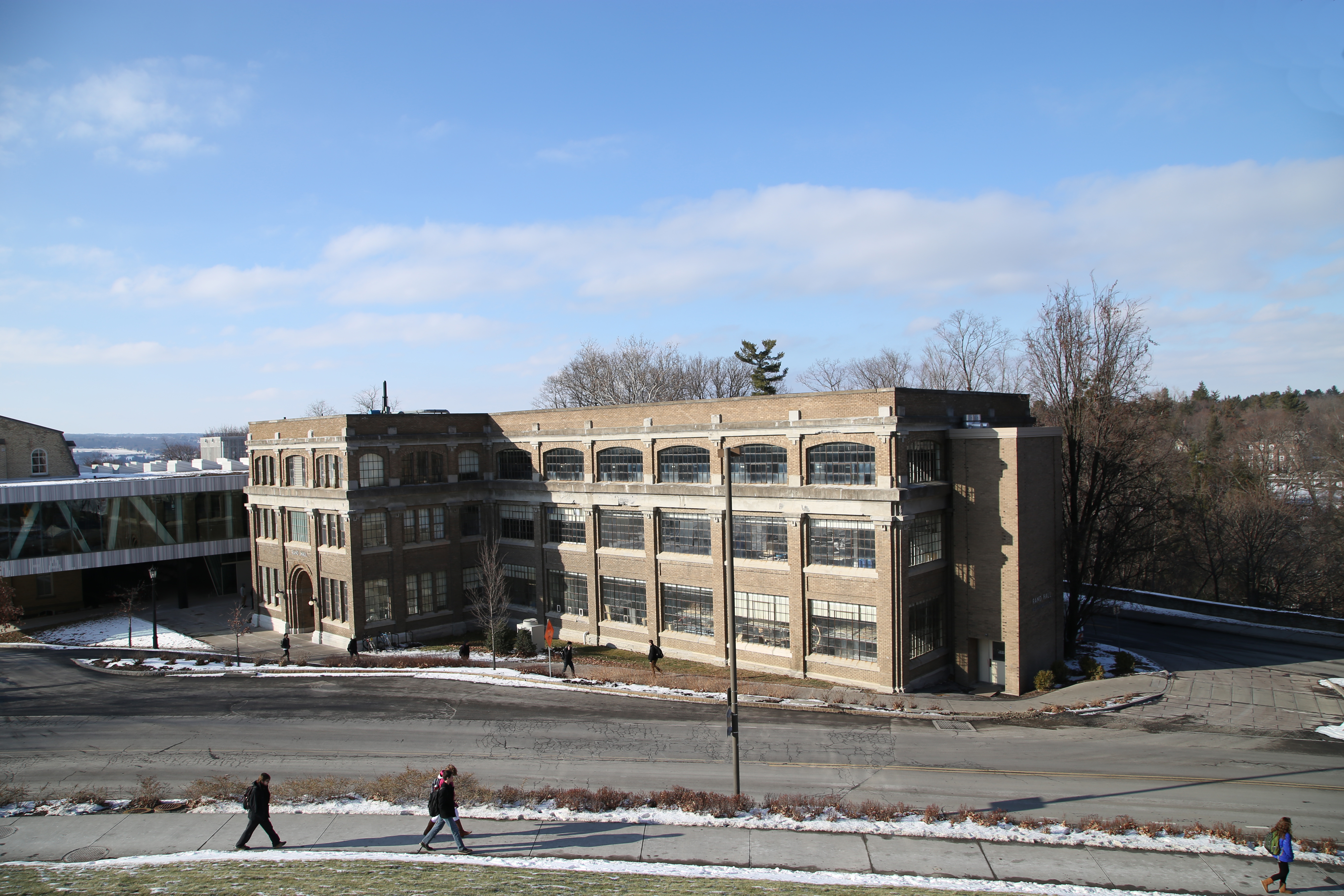
- Rand Hall on a winter day, 2015

- Location within New York

General information
- Status: Not listed as Landmark
- Type: Support Building
- Architectural style: Neoclassical
- Location: 947 University Ave, City of Ithaca, Tompkins NY
- Coordinates: 42°27′4.4″N 76°28′57.7″W
- Completed: 1911
- Owner: Cornell University

Technical details
- Floor count: 3
- Floor area: 30,379 sq ft
- Lifts/elevators: 1

Design and construction
- Architects: Gibb & Waltz

Rand Hall is a three-story building on the North East of Cornell University's central campus in Ithaca, New York. Rand houses part of Cornell's College of Architecture, Art and Planning.

== History ==
=== Sibley College ===
Rand Hall was constructed by the architects Gibb & Waltz of Ithaca (who also designed the Sibley Dome) in 1912 in a yellow brick Neoclassical Style, Rand Hall was donated by Mrs. Henry Lang of Montclair, New Jersey, and named for Jasper Raymond Rand and Addison Crittenden Rand, founders of the Rand Drill Company, and Jasper Raymond Rand, Jr, who was an 1897 graduate of Sibley College.

The building was originally part of Cornell's Sibley College of Mechanical Engineering and the Mechanic Arts and housed the college's machine shop, pattern shop, and electrical laboratory.

=== Buckminster Fuller ===
By the early 1950s, Cornell's Department of Architecture had moved from Morse, Franklin and White Halls to Sibley and Rand. In 1954 visiting critic Buckminster Fuller built a 20-foot diameter geodesic dome on the roof of Rand which was intended to be permanent. However, vandals destroyed the dome on Halloween night.

In 1959, Rand's first floor was the home to the Cornell Computer Center.

In 1968 the first floor of Rand Hall was renovated and the second floor housed the Center for Research in Education. A second stairway was added to the building to comply with fire codes.

During the second half of the twentieth century, Rand was home for the studios, classrooms, library and fabrication shop of the College of Architecture, Art and Planning. The building is the traditional starting point of the annual Dragon Day Parade held in March the Friday before Spring Break. The majority of the dragon is fabricated inside the ground floor shop and assembled outside of the building the night before the parade.

=== Fine Arts Library ===
In Fall 2011, the Cornell Fine Arts Library was moved from the Sibley Hall dome to the top floor of Rand Hall following a reorganization coinciding with the opening of the adjacent Milstein Hall, which absorbed the majority of the department's studio and classroom space that had previously been in the old building. In 2013, the college announced a redesign of the building to house an expanded collection of the Fine Arts Library within the top two floors of Rand Hall that is planned to be a state of the art facility that provides access to both physical and digital material. The addition by Austrian architect and Cornell Architecture Alumni, Wolfgang Tschapeller is slated to begin construction in 2016.

The Rand Hall second floor space is currently in limbo, mostly empty but hosting occasional student projects and architecture reviews.

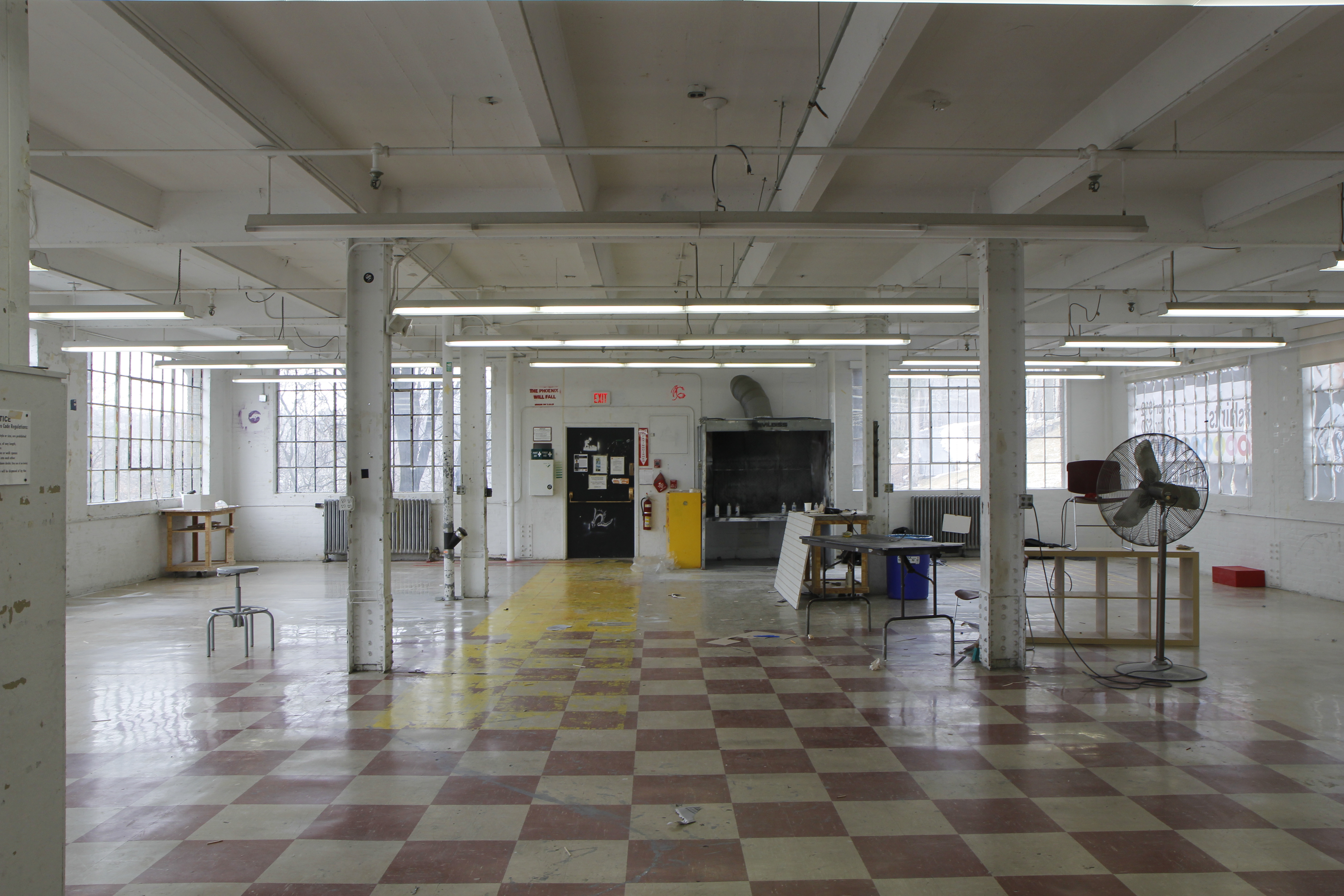
Former 1st Year studio space

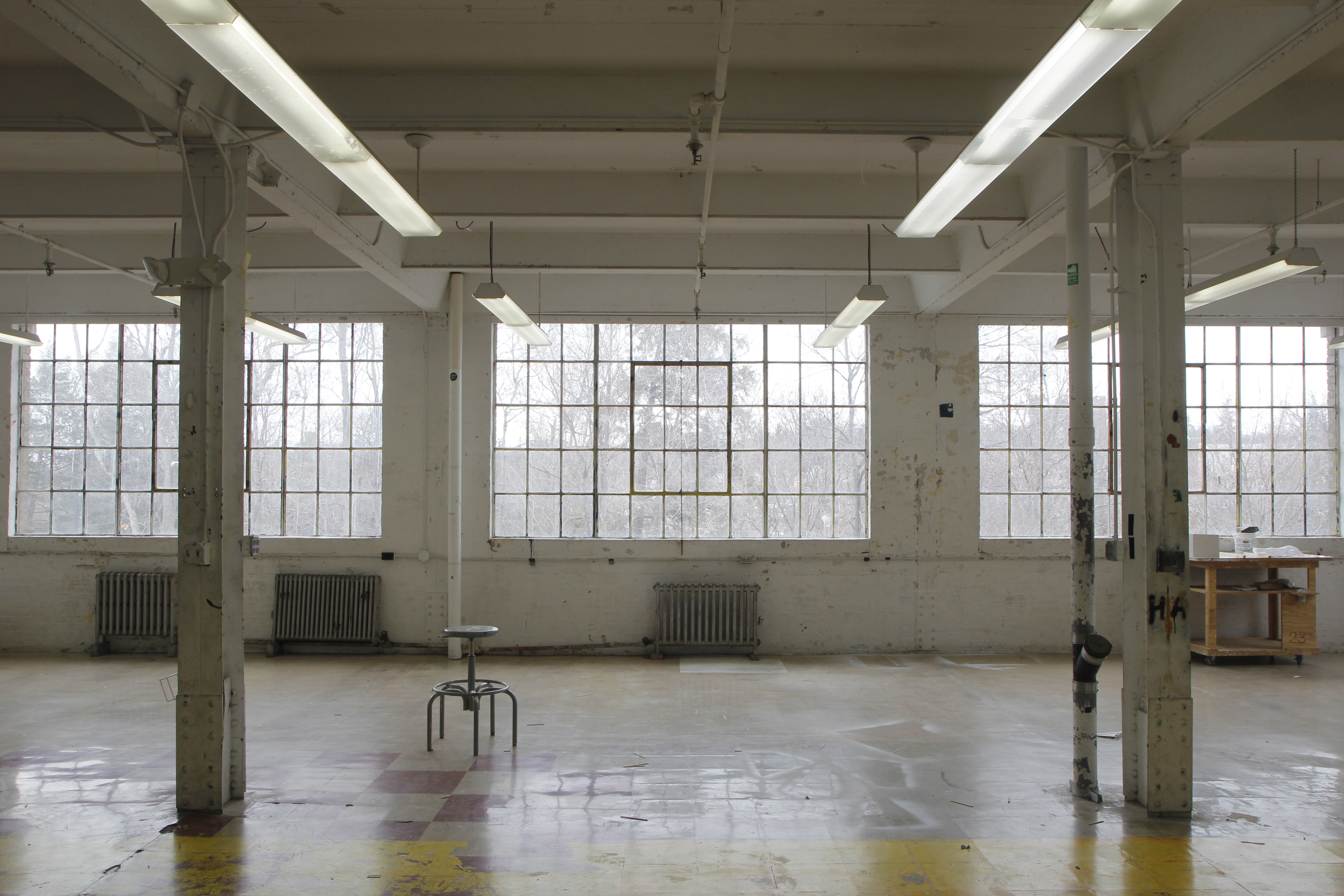
In between renovation

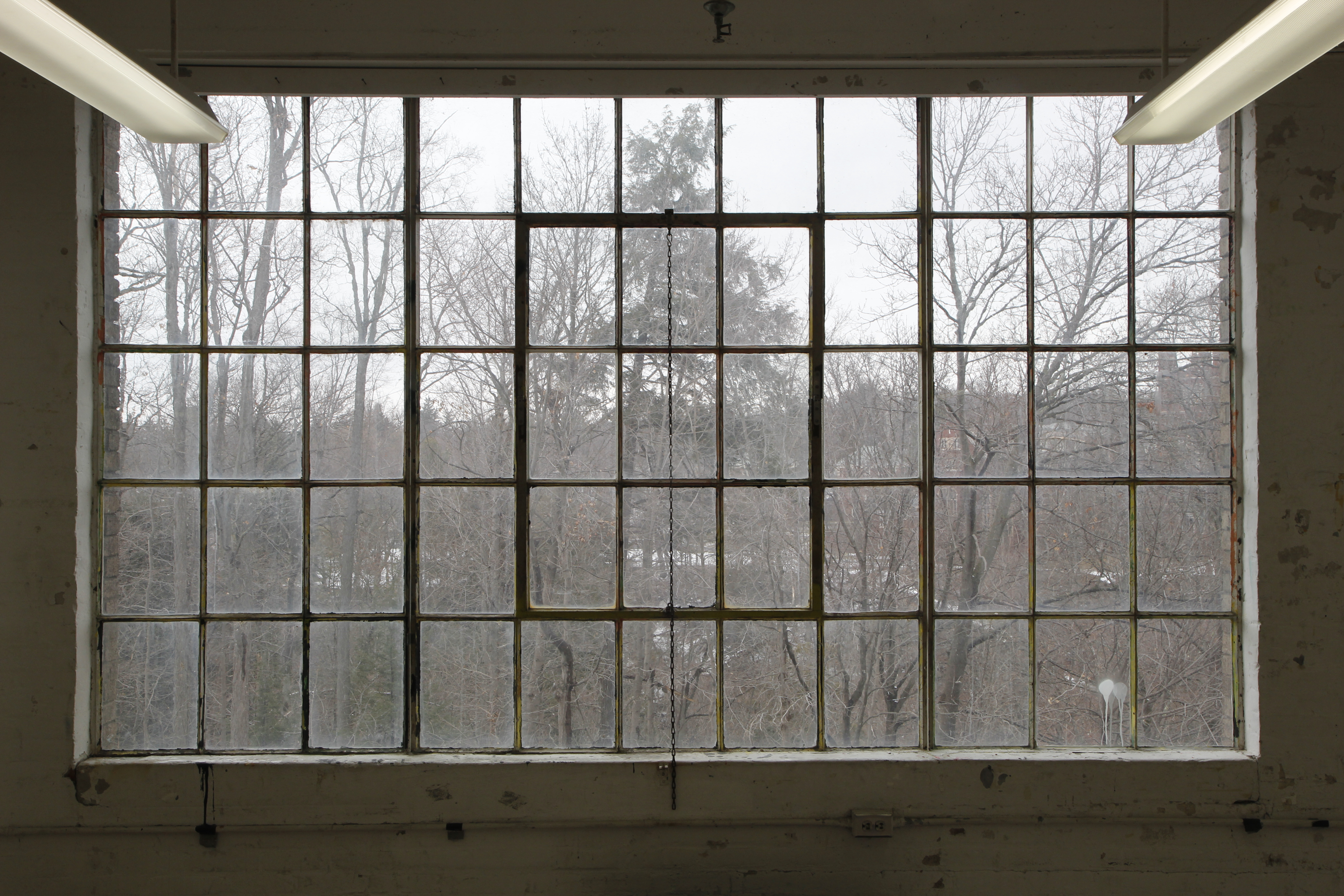
Casement windows

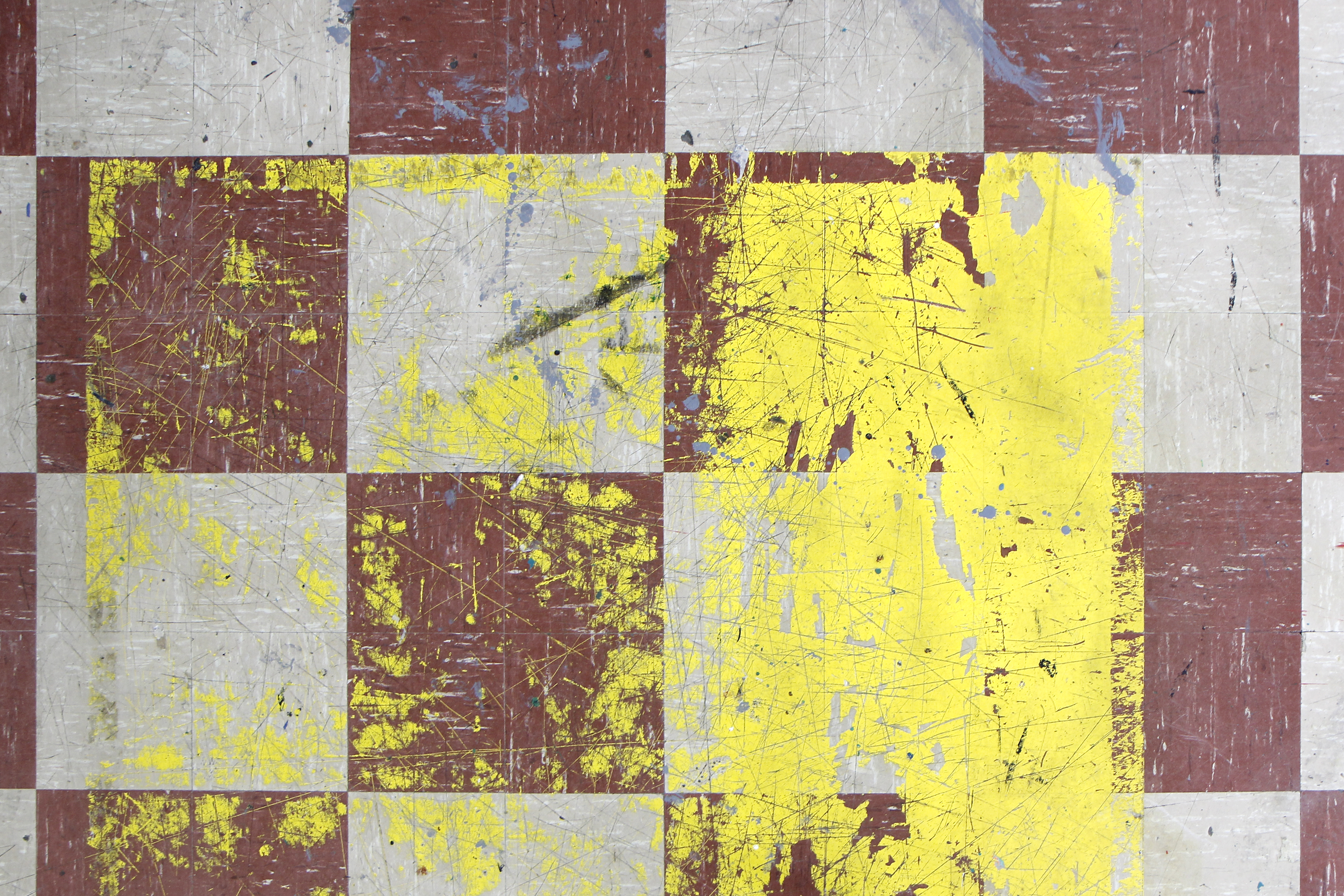
Floor tiles

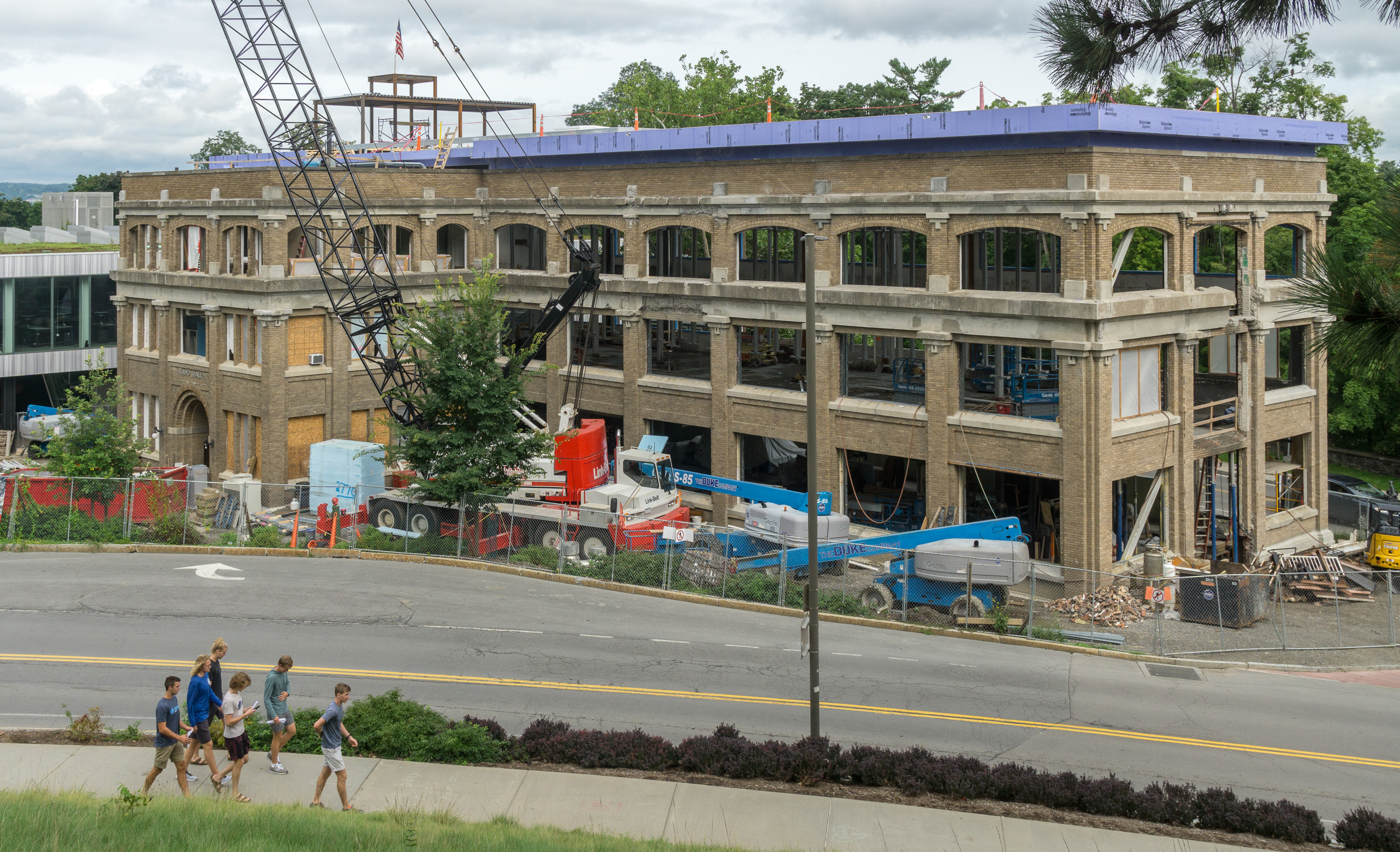
Rand Hall gutted during renovation in 2018.
