= Cornell Fine Arts Library =

Educational facility

Fine Arts Library
- 42.4513°N 76.4829°W
- Location: Ithaca, New York, United States
- Type: academic library

Other information
- Affiliation: Cornell University
- Website: https://finearts.library.cornell.edu/

The Cornell Fine Arts Library is an extensive educational facility that services the College of Architecture, Art, and Planning at Cornell University. In 1871, three years into his tenure as the first president of Cornell University, Andrew Dickson White proposed to give his architectural library, the largest collection in the country at that time, to the university in return for the creation of a Department of Architecture. In the following decade, the College of Architecture grew and so did the library, collecting the working drawings of leading architects of the day. As the architecture department moved to accommodate a need for more space, between building on the Cornell Central Campus, the library moved and expanded with it.

== Slide Collection ==
With the opening of Milstein Hall in 2011, the Fine Arts Library was moved once again: from Sibley Hall into the third floor of the adjacent building Rand Hall. In the process of moving, the library has had to reevaluate the usefulness of much of its historical materials. In 2009, the Knight Visual Resources Facility closed in light of changing forms of information access, media technology and exchange. It had contained images to support instruction at Cornell University that included subjects in art history, architecture, landscape architecture, planning, material culture, maps, and other documentary material. After its closure, the College of Architecture, Art, and Planning (AAP) was left with hundreds of thousands of 35mm slides, as well as some lantern slides, which had served the teaching needs of the architecture and art communities at Cornell. Cornell University, among other academic institutions, has struggled with what to do with its outdated collections and whether they should continue to be preserved in archives or disposed of.

"Early on, based on criteria including provenance, uniqueness, significance, condition, and need, the advisory group and consultants determined that the bulk of the 35mm slide collection should not be retained. Although the collection had been a rich, invaluable resource for teaching within AAP and related disciplines, many parts of the collection did not have significant original archival value. In other words, since the images consisted largely of surrogates of published materials (copy stand work), they had limited potential research use as primary historical documents. Whereas the completeness and local availability of the collection had previously been important for its function as a teaching collection, at this time the collection was evaluated cross-institutionally – which is common practice in special collections and increasingly common in visual resources collections. It was appraised based on the origin of the photographs and the availability of the images online or at other institutions. In addition, any slides recommended for archival retention were considered with respect to their potential research use in future image based historical scholarship"
