= Dragon Day =

Annual event

Cornell Dragon Day
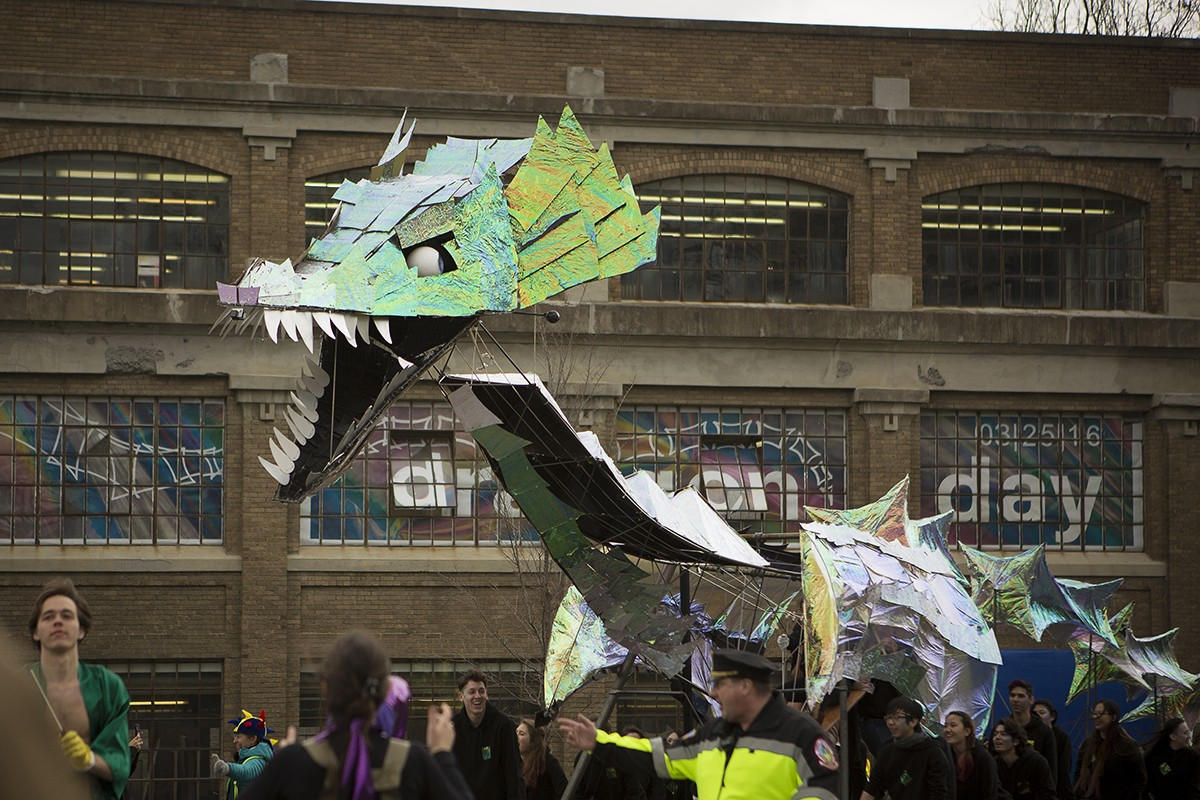
- Dragon Day 2016
- Frequency: Annually, last Friday before spring break
- Locations: Ithaca, New York, U.S.
- Inaugurated: 1901
- Next event: March 27, 2026
- Organizer: Cornell University

Dragon Day is an annual event that occurs the Friday before spring break at Cornell University. The center of the event is the procession of a dragon, created by first-year architecture students at the Cornell University College of Architecture, Art, and Planning. The construction is funded by selling Dragon Day t-shirts.

== Origins and evolution ==
The first event was in 1901. Believing that there should be a "College of Architecture Day," student Willard Straight of the class of 1901 led a group of architecture students around campus carrying a model dragon. This was partly inspired by the legend of St. Patrick driving all the snakes and serpents from Ireland. Lincoln Hall, which housed the College of Architecture at the time, was decorated with orange and green banners, shamrocks, and themed decorations. In the 1950s, the event evolved into its current form, with an actual constructed dragon. It is unknown when the term "Dragon Day" was coined, but it likely came into use in the 1950s. Since then, the holiday has turned into a parade for the dragon.

Typically, the dragon is built by the entire first year architecture class as a bonding and team-building exercise. Although the parade takes place over a few hours, the event requires at least six weeks of planning and preparation beforehand. The event is fully student-funded, primarily through selling commemorative t-shirts.

Although it is typically carried from beneath by architecture students, in 1964 and 1976 the dragon was mounted on a car and driven through the route. In 1985, the dragon fell over as it rounded Sibley Hall, and was not able to complete its route. In 2009, due to new New York State Department of Environmental Conservation regulations, the dragon was not burned at the end of the parade route; the dragon's "nest" was burned instead. Since the dragon can no longer be burned, various tactics have been employed to create a climactic spectacle. In 2012, first year architects squirted the dragon with paint. And in 2013, the white dragon was colored with multicolored Holi powder throughout the parade and at the Arts Quad finale.

Dragon Day festivities were cancelled in 2020 and 2021 due to the COVID-19 pandemic. The 2022 dragon was larger than usual. It was constructed by two AAP classes, and sported two heads to represent the two classes.

2023 marked a very strong comeback to Dragon Day since the pandemic. The freshman class sported a colorful dragon covered in recycled fabric with a rather cartoonish face. It was paraded through campus and destroyed at the ending ceremony in the Arts Quad. Its wings were placed on an installation in the Arts Quad.

== Politics and pranks ==
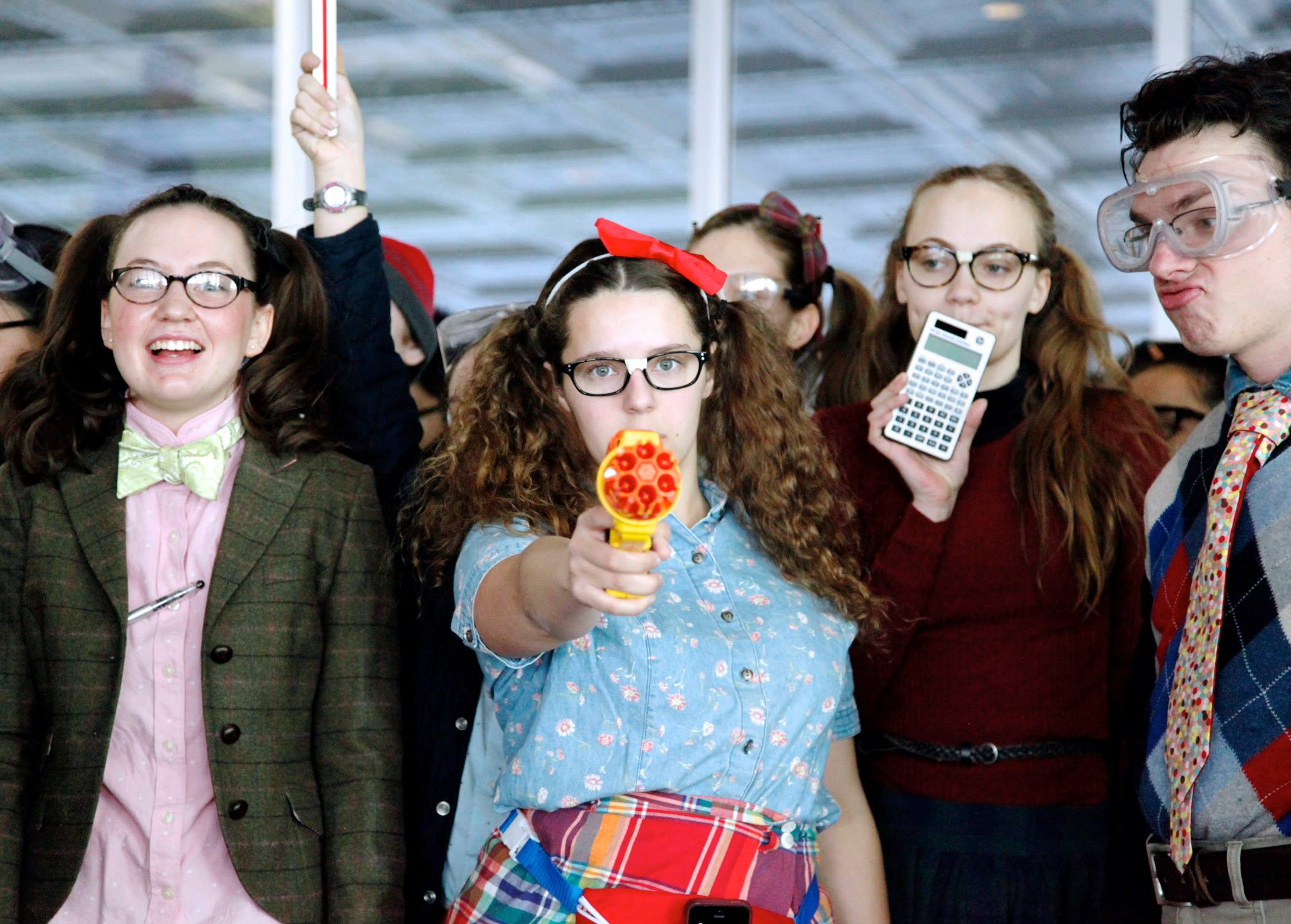
Nerd Walk 2015

Dragon Day has been used as a form of political expression. At some point between its origin and 1920, the festivities were banned by Cornell's third president, Jacob Gould Schurman, because campus Catholics were offended by the theme. During the 1933-1934 school year, students constructed a large paper-mache beer stein to celebrate the repeal of Prohibition. In the 1950s, Dragon Day was cancelled in protest of Senator McCarthy's red scare. In 1968, the dragon was controversially painted entirely black in protest of the Vietnam War. In 1994, the possible cancellation of the Cornell in Rome architecture program prompted students to adopt a "Fall of Rome" theme.

Campus pranks often surround Dragon Day. In 1966, a green pig was released into the Ivy Room, a dining hall, resulting in a massive food fight. In 1974, artist Oded Halahmy threatened to remove his outdoor sculptures from the campus after some were splattered with green paint and moved. The week before Dragon Day, the freshmen architects can be found running through campus lecture halls, barely clothed and painted green. At night, they moon the windows of Uris Library's Cocktail Lounge. In 1990, the Department of Architecture severed all ties with the holiday due to the pranks, but began re-affiliating with it in 1993.

Since the early 2000s, Nerd Walk has been an annual part of the event. The first-year students dress up and went through Cornell University libraries and engineering buildings (notably Duffield Hall) looking at books, attracting attention, and handing out quarter cards to advertise the Dragon Day event.

== Phoenix Society ==
Dragon Day signifies a rivalry between Cornell architecture students and those in the College of Engineering. In 1933, a fight broke out between the rivals during the parade, resulting in an architecture student going to the infirmary for a concussion. During the second half of the 1980s, several incidents of violence between engineering and architecture students were associated with Dragon Day.

Beginning in 1986, several attempts were made to channel engineers' frustrations into more creative outlets. In 1986, in the middle of the Cold War, a group of civil engineering students prepared a mock ICBM which they carried in an effort to ram the dragon as it passed by the engineering quad. They were immediately stopped short by architects protecting their creation. In the spring of 1987, a larger group of engineering students came together to once again create an organized response to Dragon Day. In an effort to reduce chances of violence, the group chose to create a rather passive phoenix bird to hover over the engineering quad as the dragon passed by. Unfortunately, the helium filled giant metallized plastic balloon deflated by the time the dragon rolled around over two hours late.

Not satisfied with this mediocre performance, the group founded the Phoenix Society and vowed to annually meet the dragon with an engineering avatar. Dropping the non-aggressive stance, the group unanimously voted to construct a knight on horseback in the spring of 1988. Two days before Dragon Day, architects managed to break into the engineers' workshop. Fortunately the leader of the architects persuaded his fellow students to leave the engineers' knight unharmed and the group only made off with the original Phoenix Society banner, a remnant of the original mylar phoenix balloon.

Thus the knight survived to confront the dragon, his horse rearing on his hind legs and his sword raised into the air. Following this first successful engineering confrontation with the dragon, a sporadic custom has developed, with varying themes: a Viking longboat in 1989, a cobra in 2001, a penguin in 2005.

In 1998 and 1999, an industrious engineer using 3/4" bolt cutters managed to steal the steering wheel off of the car that the architects used for the frame of the dragon. The wheels were proudly displayed on the parapets of castles that the engineers constructed on the engineering quad to meet the dragon.

The holiday is still traditionally carried on by freshmen. The windows of Rand Hall, the former home of design studios of the Department of Architecture, are decorated in anticipation of the event.

Phoenix designs over the years
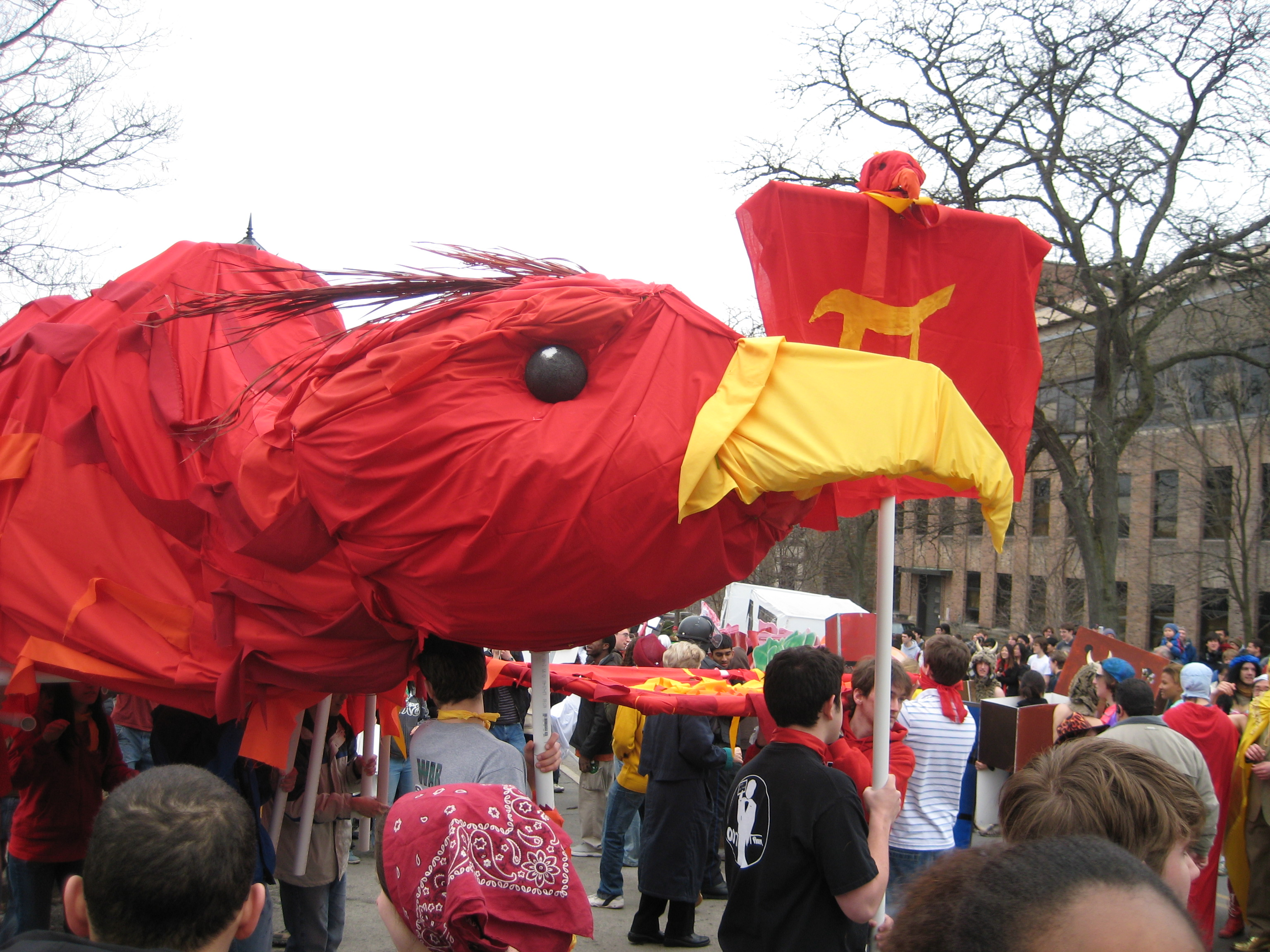
2008

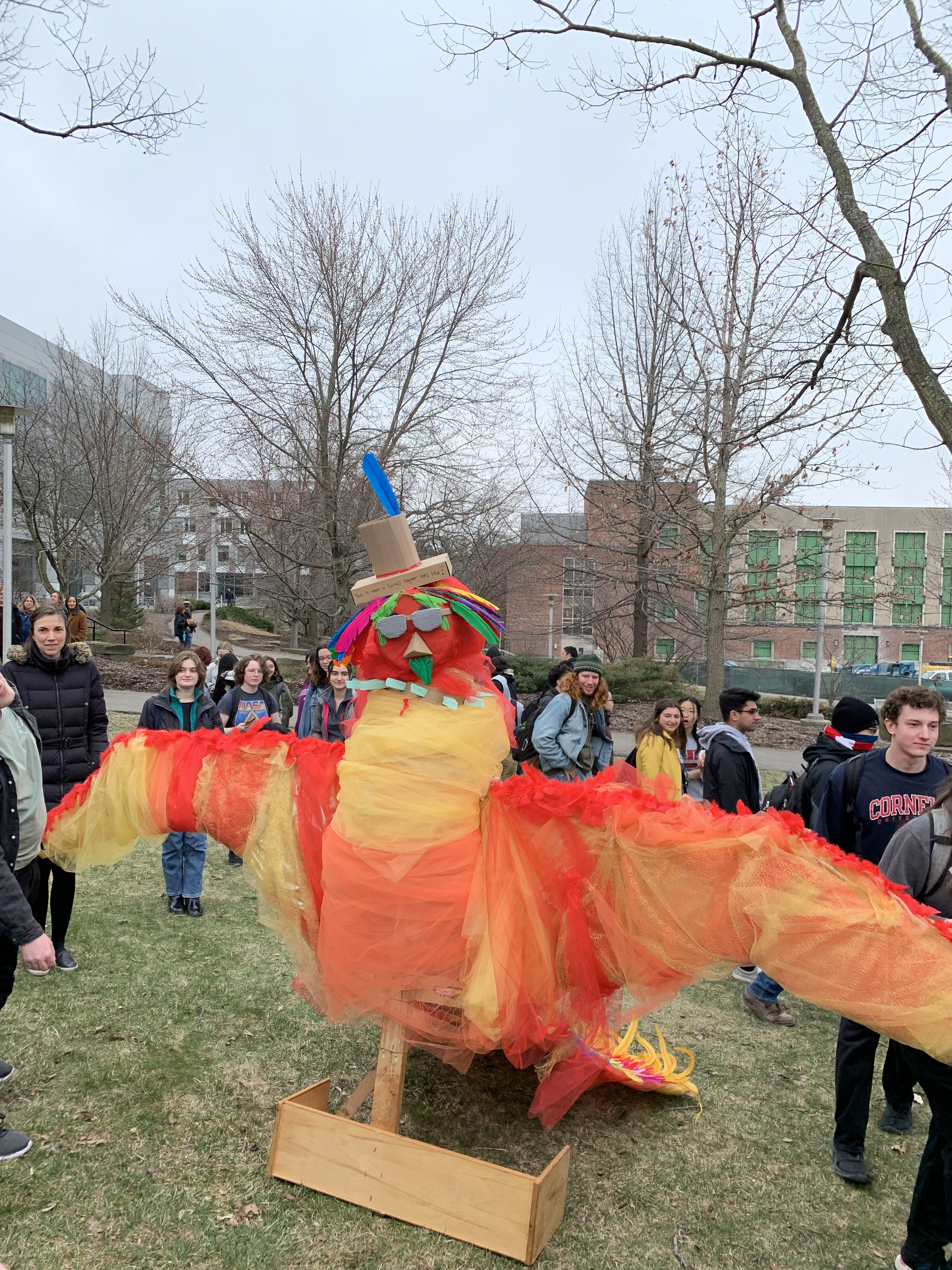
2023

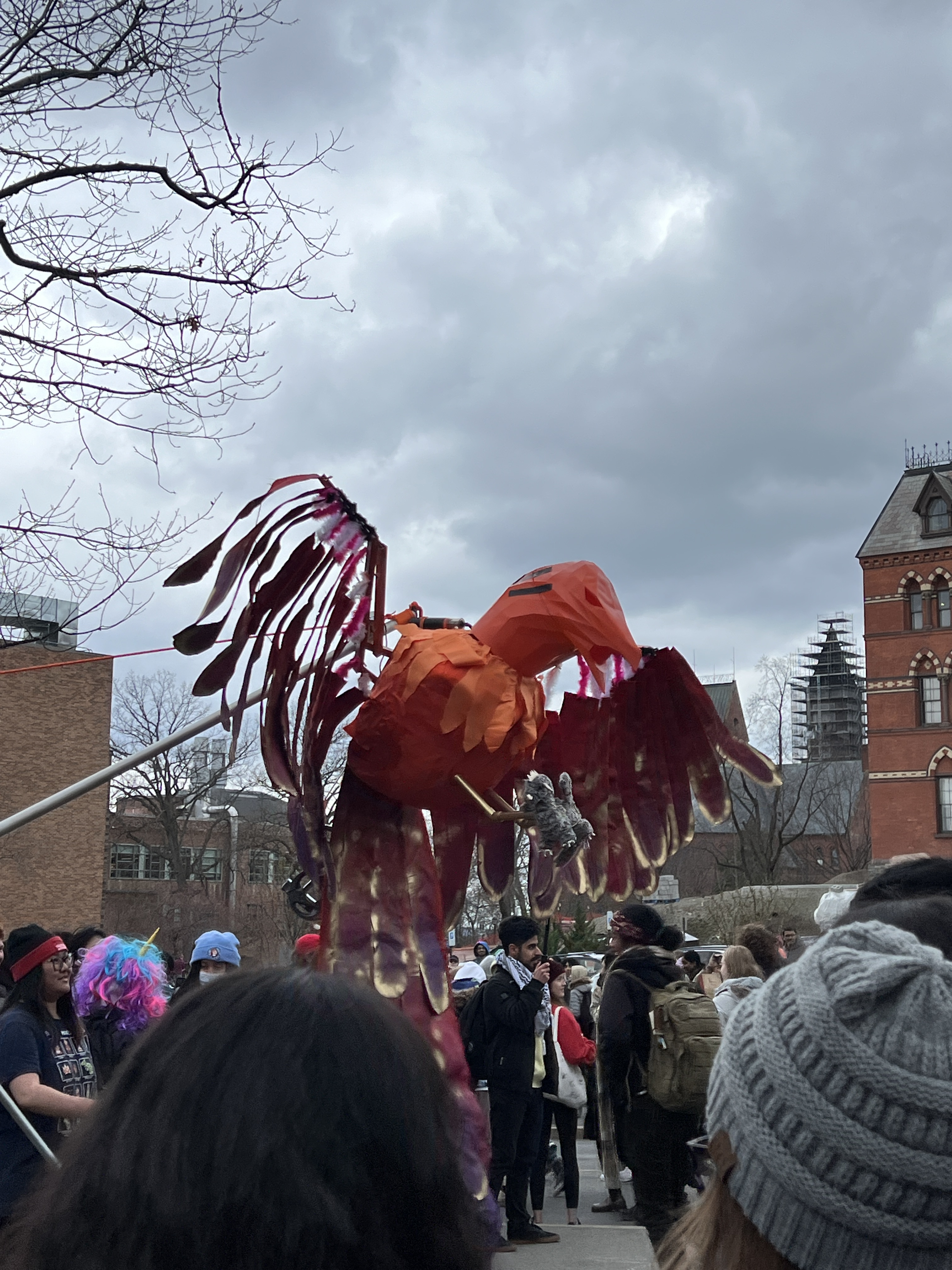
2024

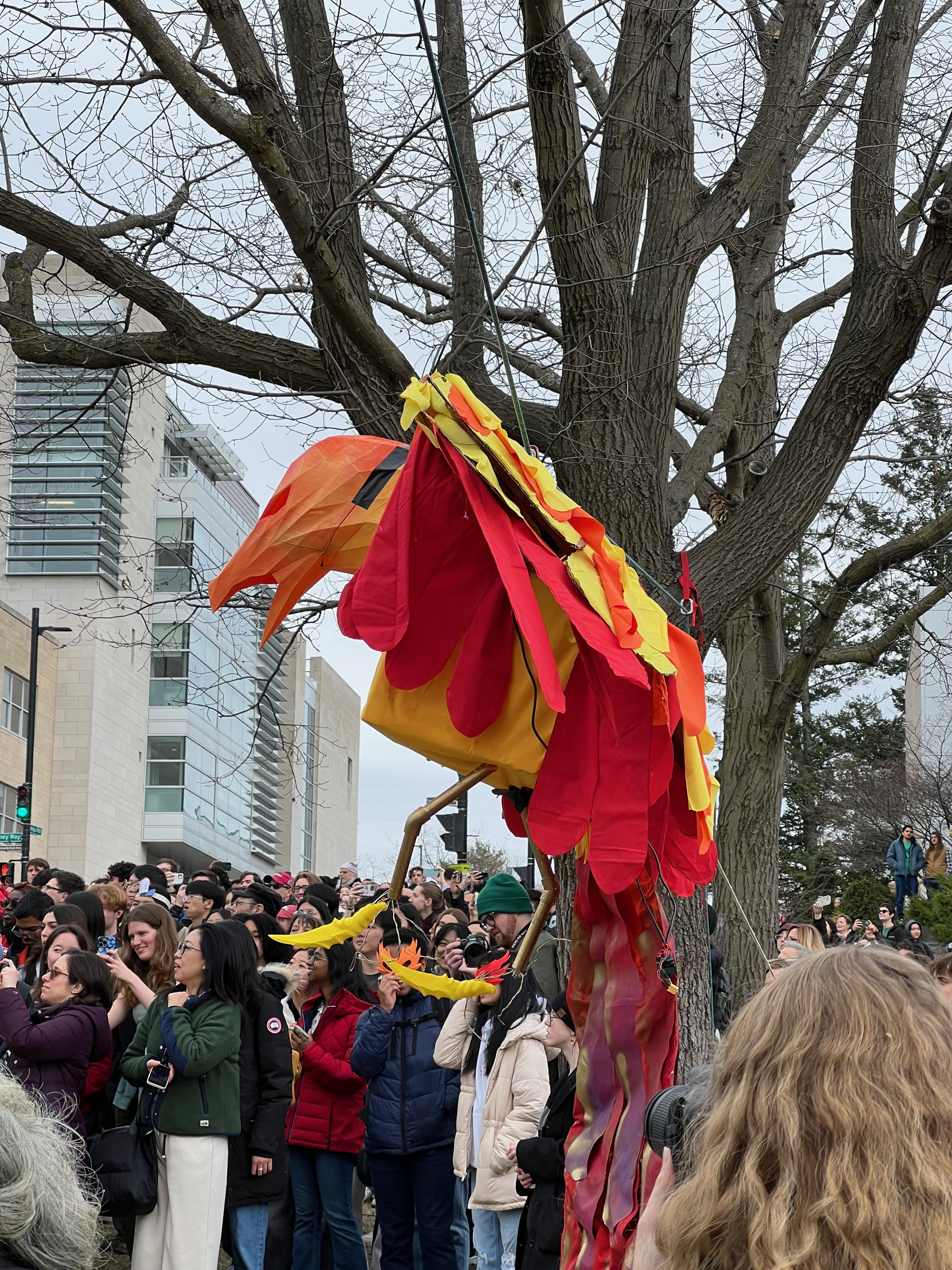
2025

== The Theatre, Film, and Dance Knight ==
Not to be confused with the Engineer Knight of 1988, the Theatre, Film, and Dance Knight is a recent addition to Dragon Day, now created yearly by students from the Department of Performing and Media Arts with a budget of under $500, a build time of less than 48 hours, and a work team numbering between 5-20.

This tradition was begun partially as a student response to budget cuts handed down to the Department of Theatre, Film, and Dance by the College of Arts and Sciences and serves the dual purpose of establishing campus presence and proving departmental quality by submitting a float superior to its rivals. Chants during the event frequently make reference to the department overcoming these cuts.

The knight made its first appearance in the spring of 2011, when students from Cornell's Department of Theatre, Film, and Dance constructed a large knight-like figure brandishing a pole-arm and pulled it into Ho Plaza with the stated intention of "slaying the dragon". However, they were asked to kindly step to the side as the dragon passed through the square. The students complied, but then resorted to heckling the architects and chanting in protest of the budget cuts. The 2011 knight's final showing was a dramatic traversing of the Arts Quad, where the students alternated between chanting clever quips and singing "We Shall Overcome".

Incarnations of the knight in past years have included a skeletal horseman atop a rearing horse in the spring of 2012, and the Black Knight from Monty Python and the Holy Grail in the spring of 2013, featuring a moving head controlled by a puppeteer and arm stumps that sprayed water at the surrounding crowd.

The knight serves as a student memorial to the Department of Theatre, Film, and Dance, which has since been renamed the Department of Performing and Media Arts.

== Physics Unicorn ==
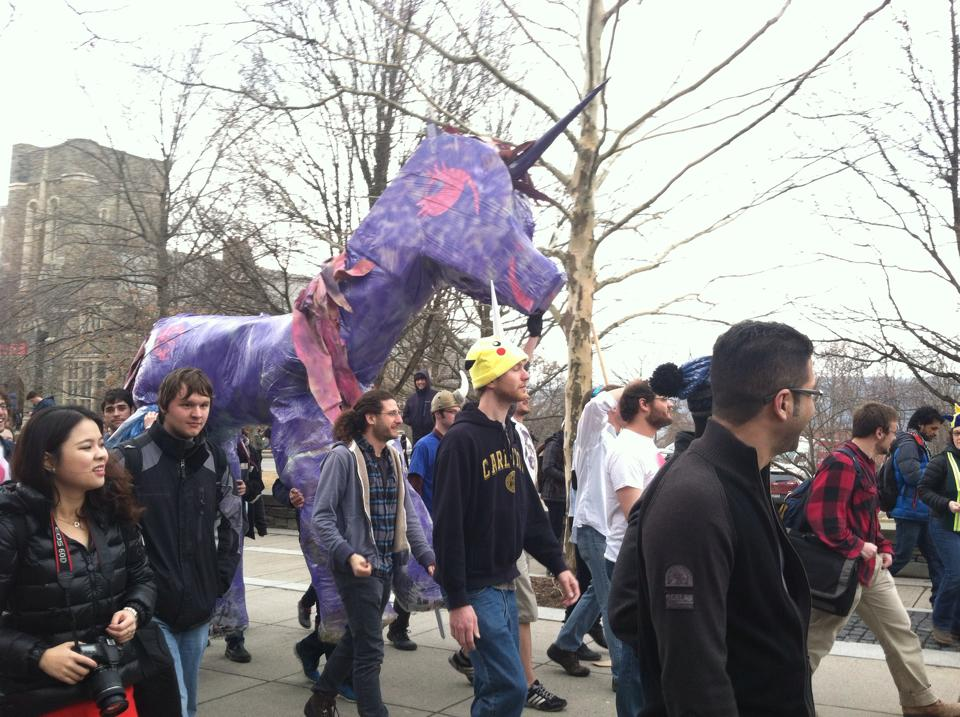
2014 Dragon Day Physics Unicorn

Starting in 2014, the physics community—motivated both by being left out of Dragon Day and also by the fact that like the architects and engineers, physicists are very capable of building things—has entered the fray of Dragon Day festivities. In 2014, a team of physicists—composed of mostly graduate students, but also some undergraduate students—constructed the first annual Physics Unicorn, modeled after Twilight Sparkle. The tradition was continued in 2015 with the creation of a silver unicorn army commanded by Tyrael—that is, a student dressed up as Tyrael.

== Dragon Design ==
The dragon 'float' is designed and constructed by the first-year architecture students. Construction takes place in Rand Hall shop and behind Rand Hall along University Ave. Over the years, the dragons have taken on various forms, sometimes incorporating moving elements, like wings, scales, and heads. Part of the dragon is mounted on a stripped car chassis, which is steered by a student. Dragon Day 2018 (Class of 2022) currently holds the record for the longest dragon, measuring approximately 140 feet.

Dragon designs over the years
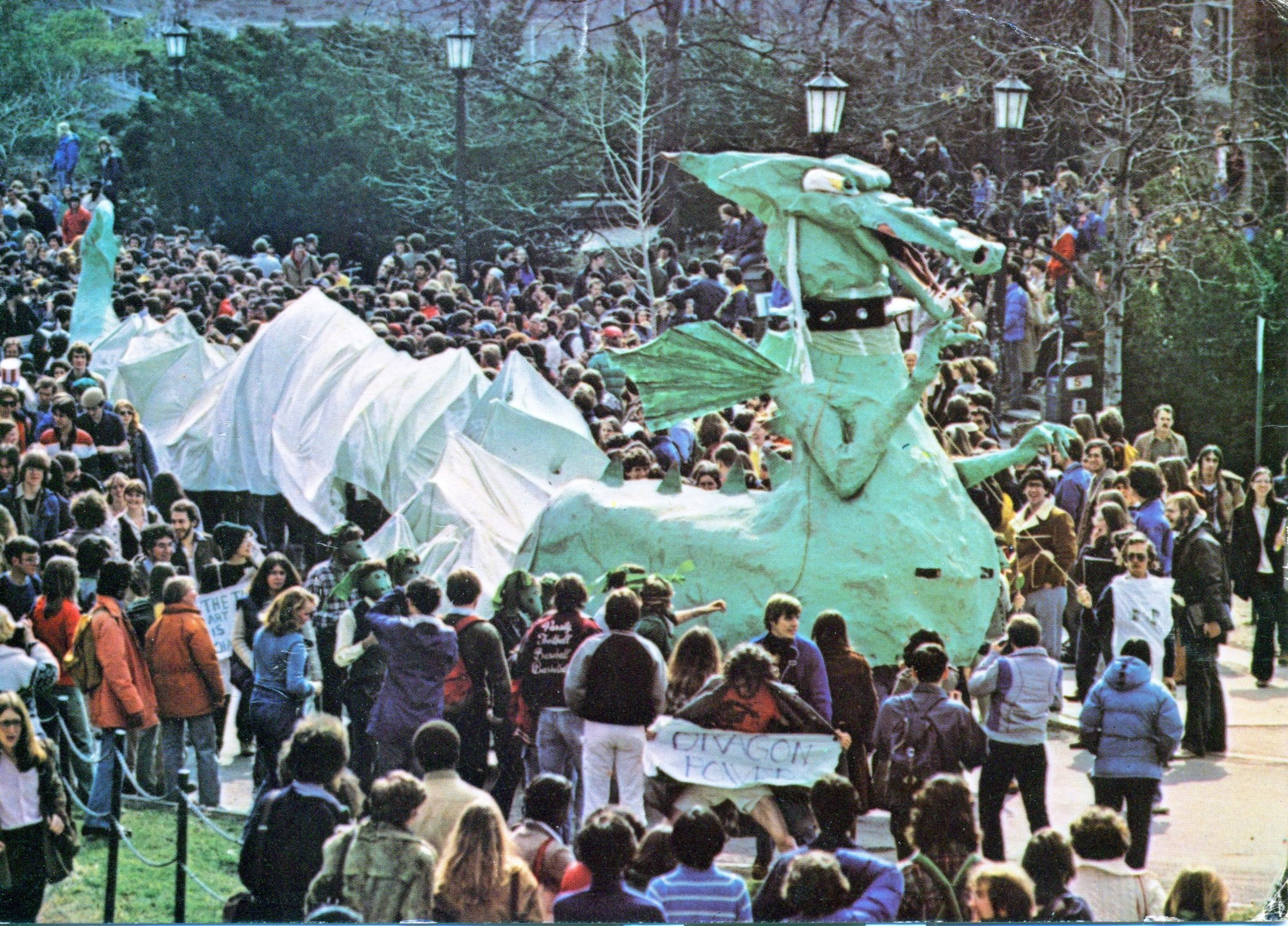
1979

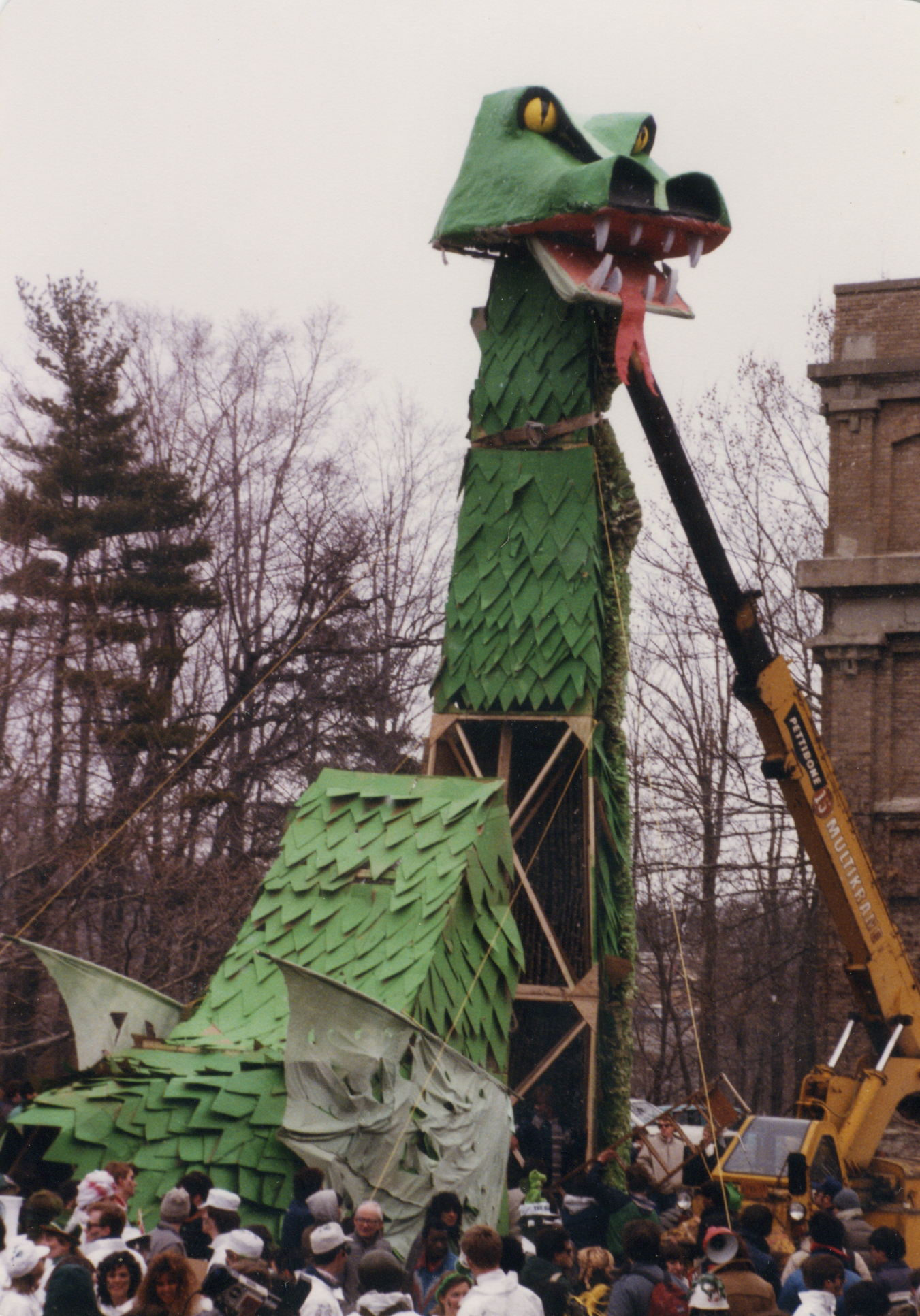
1985

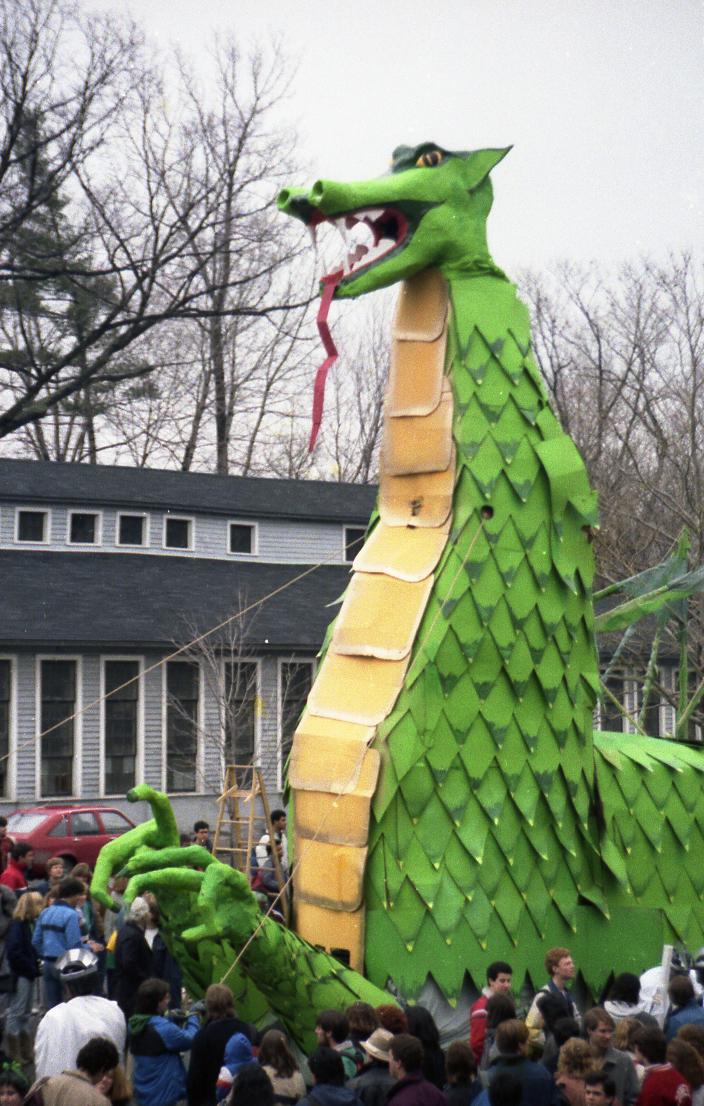
1986

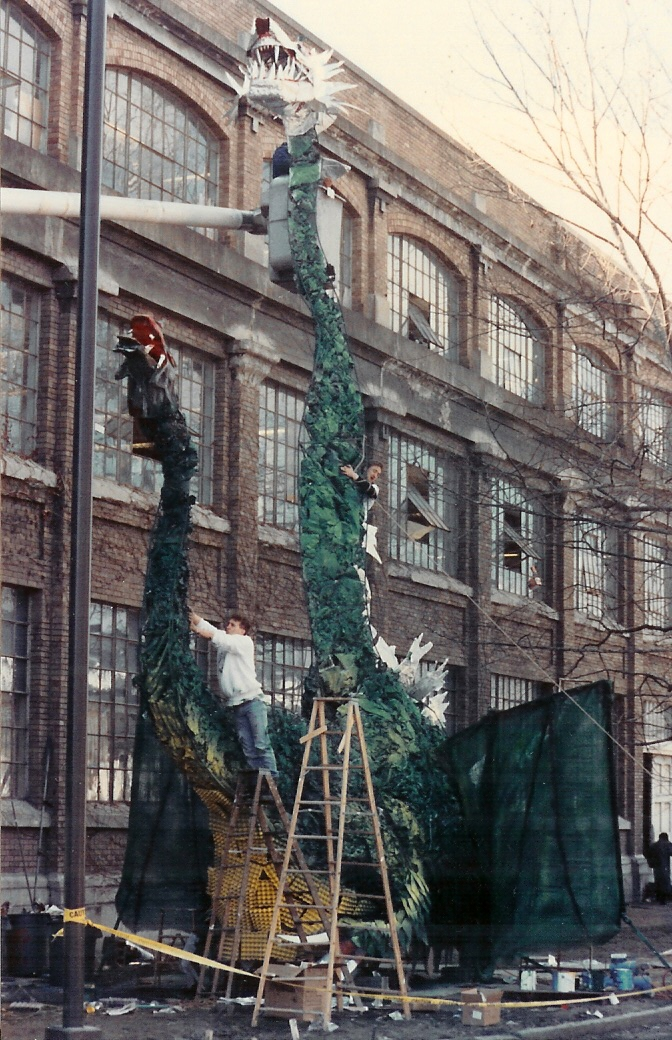
1988: Two-Headed

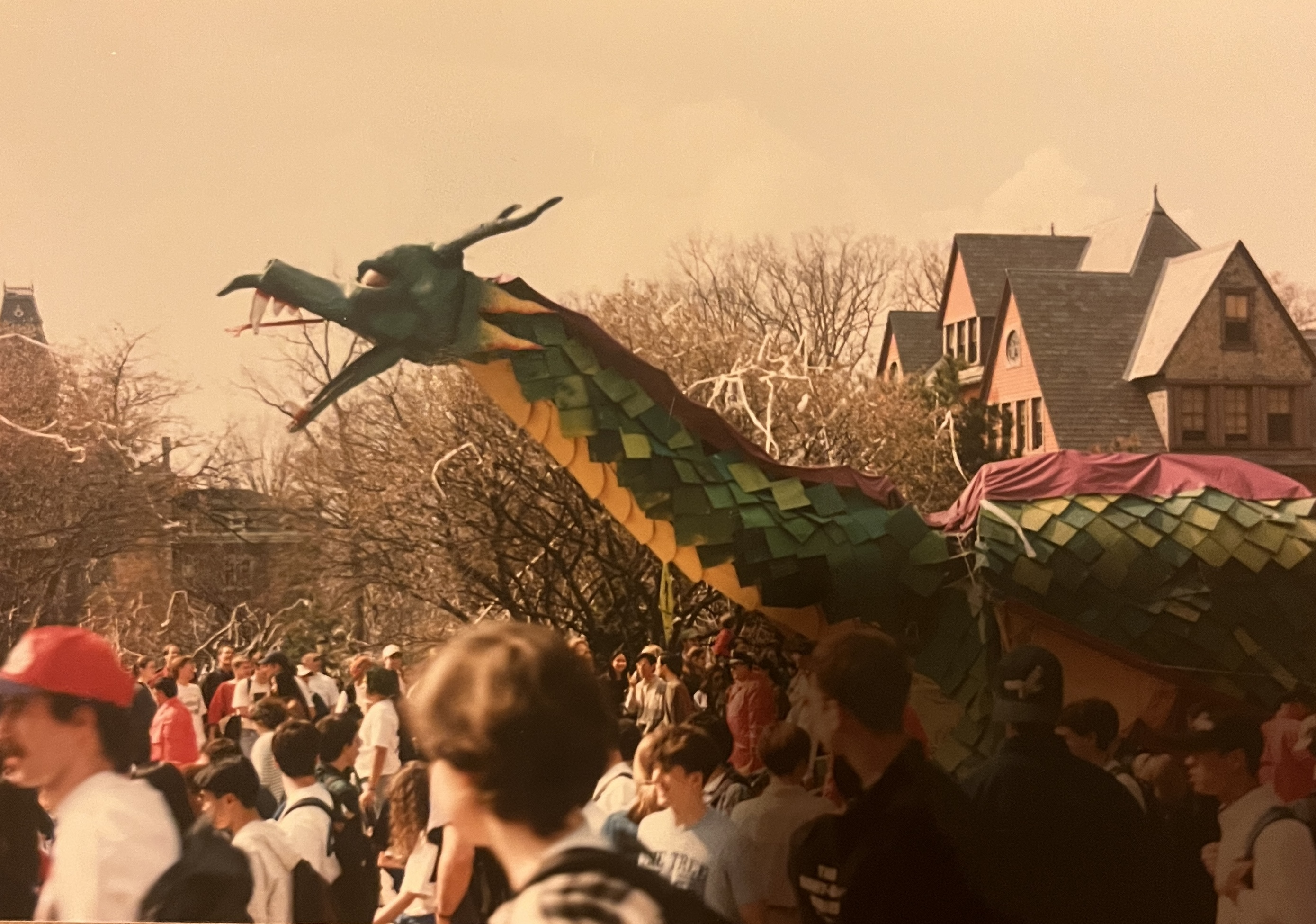
1995

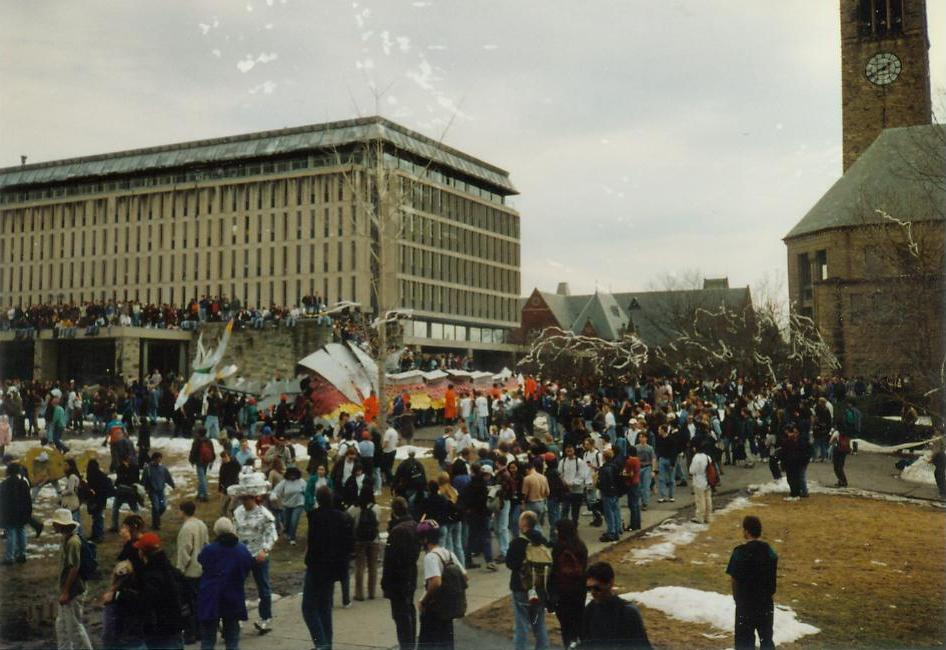
1996

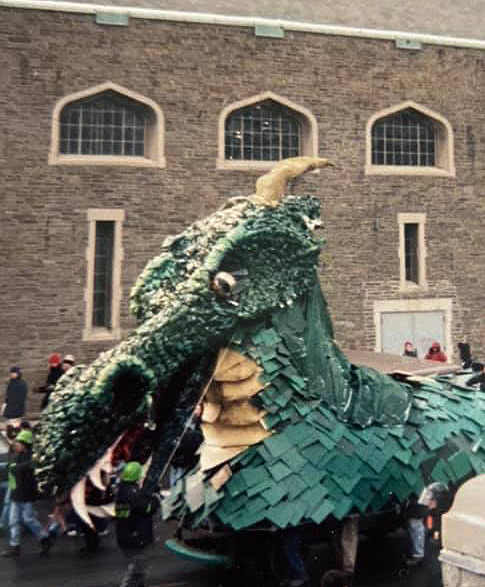
1998

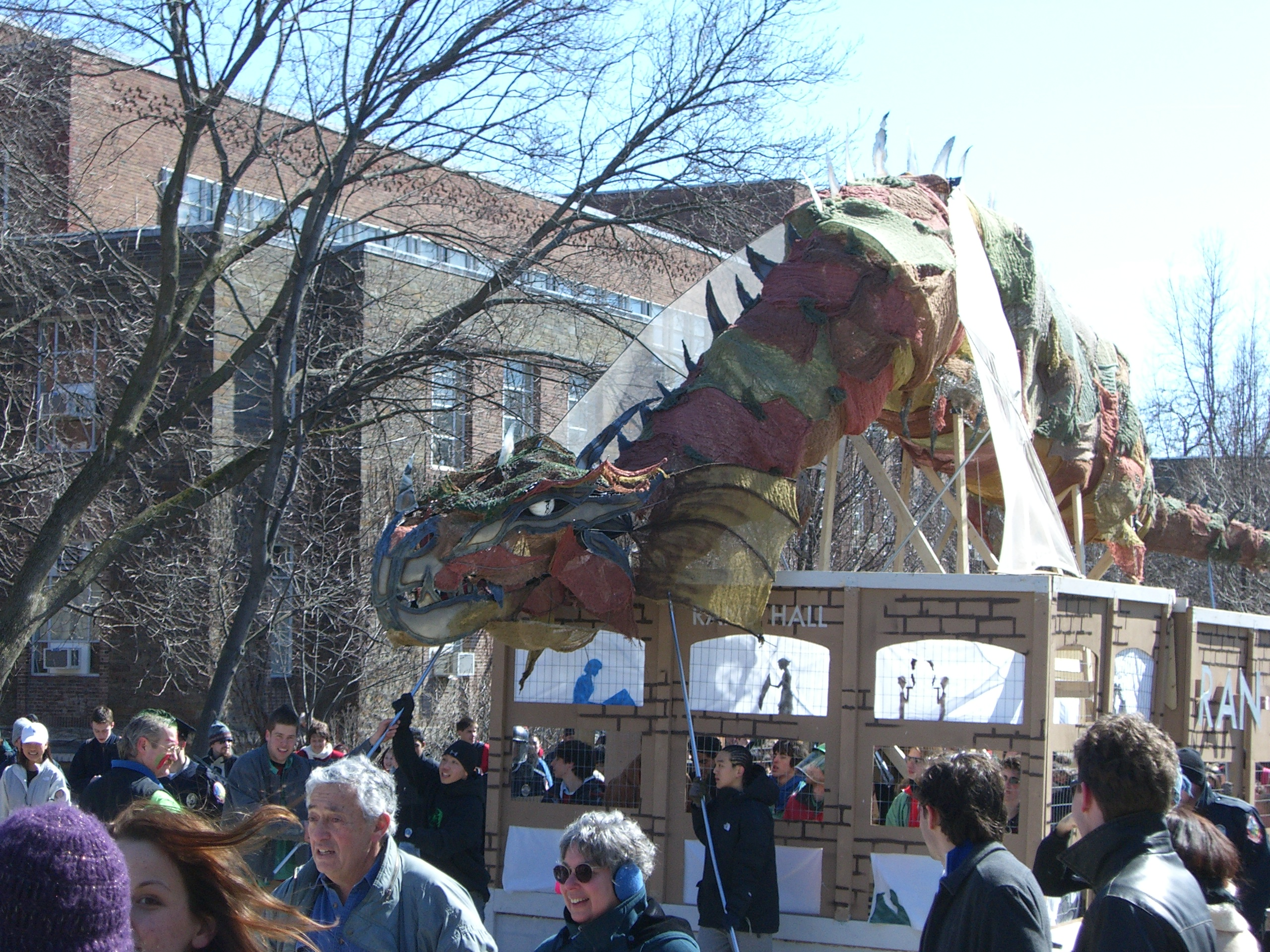
2006

2007

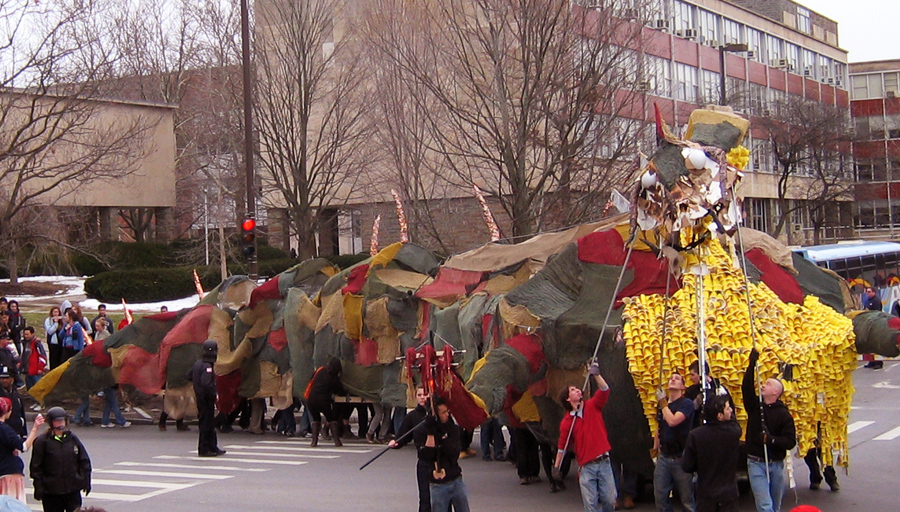
2008

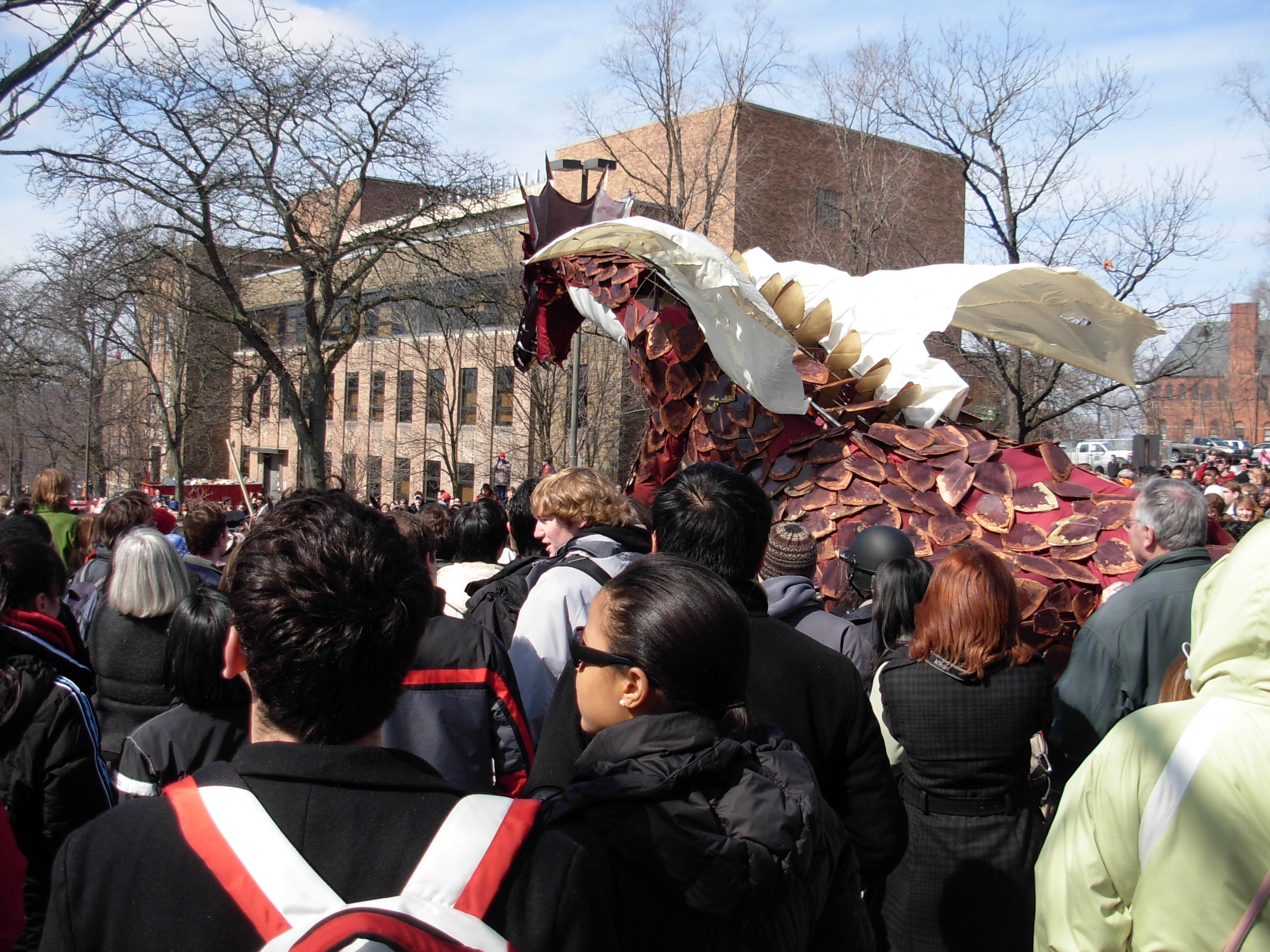
2009

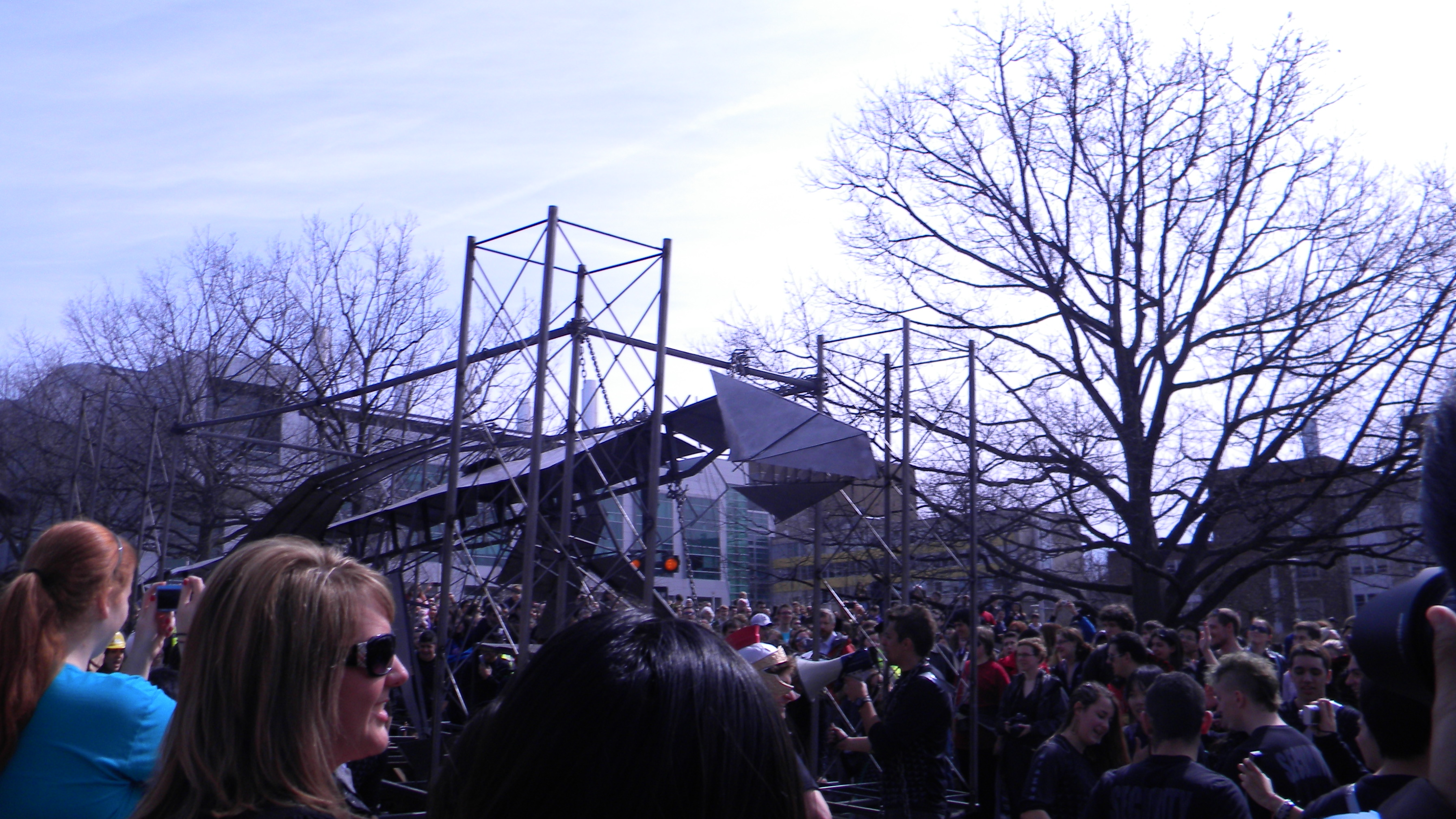
2011

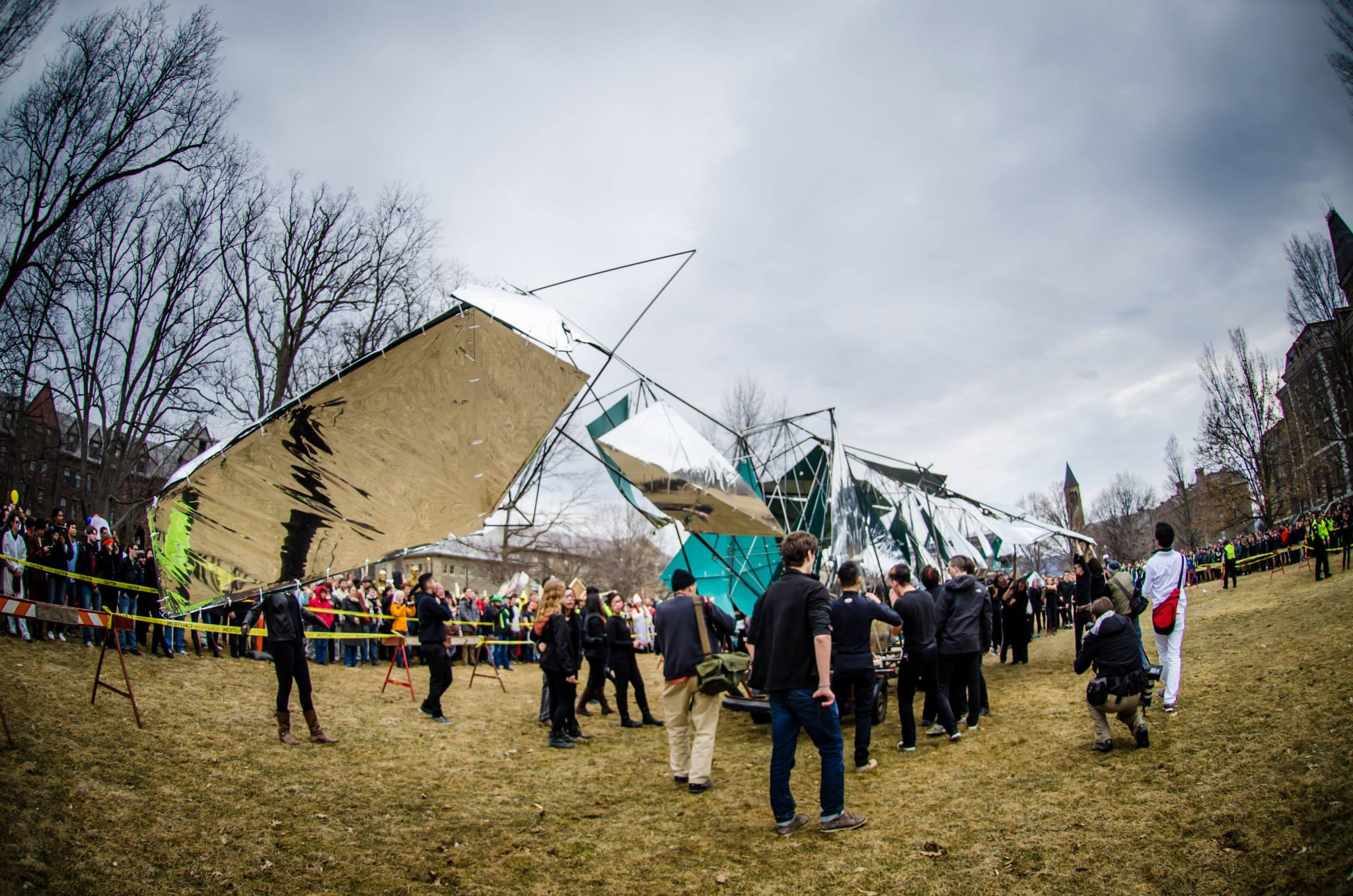
2014: INVISIBLE

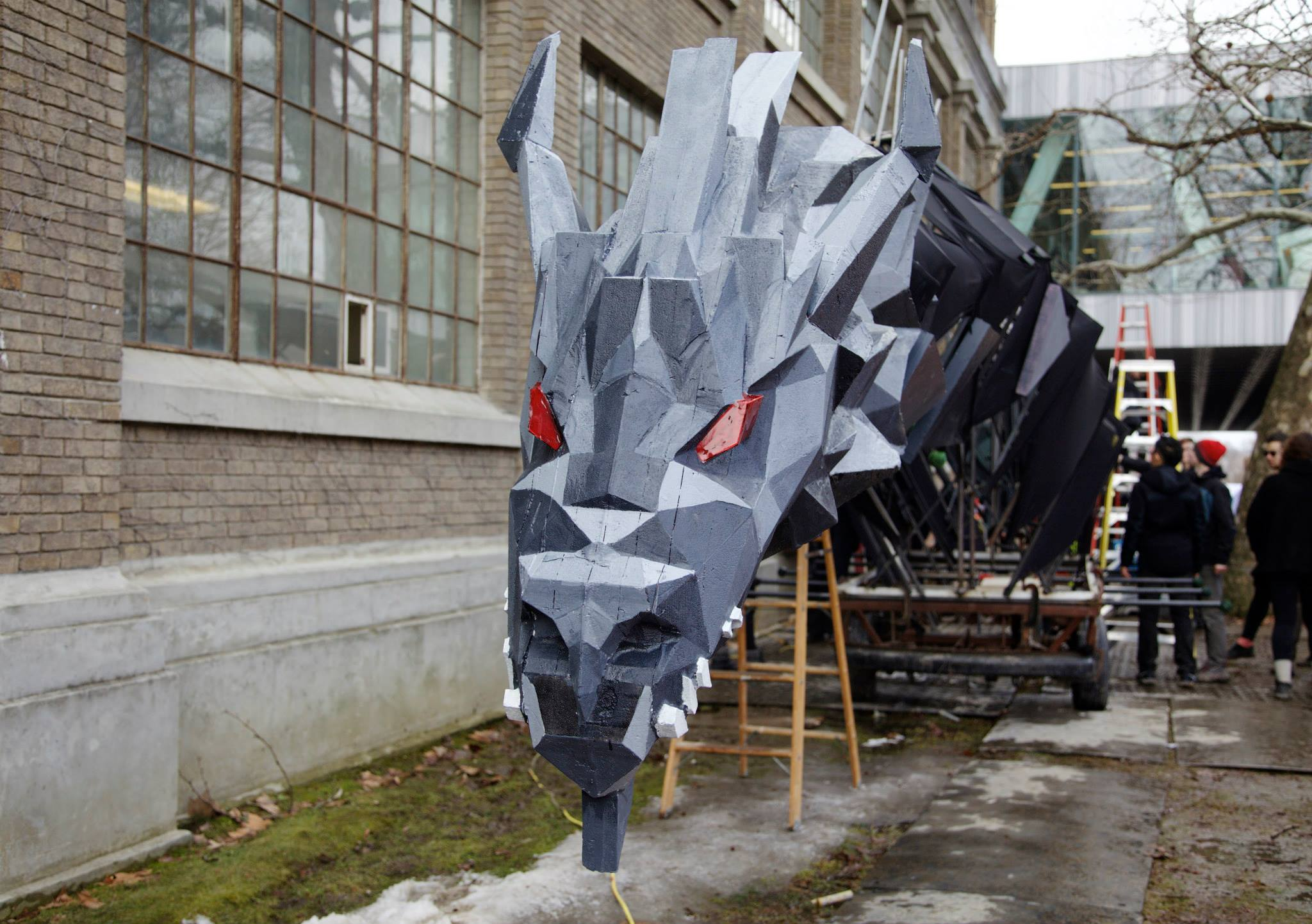
2015: APOCALYPSE

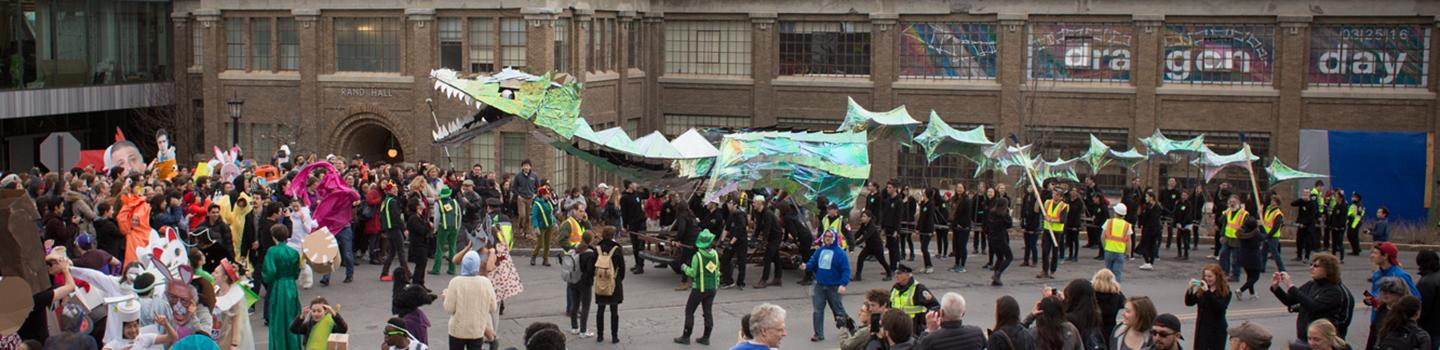
2016

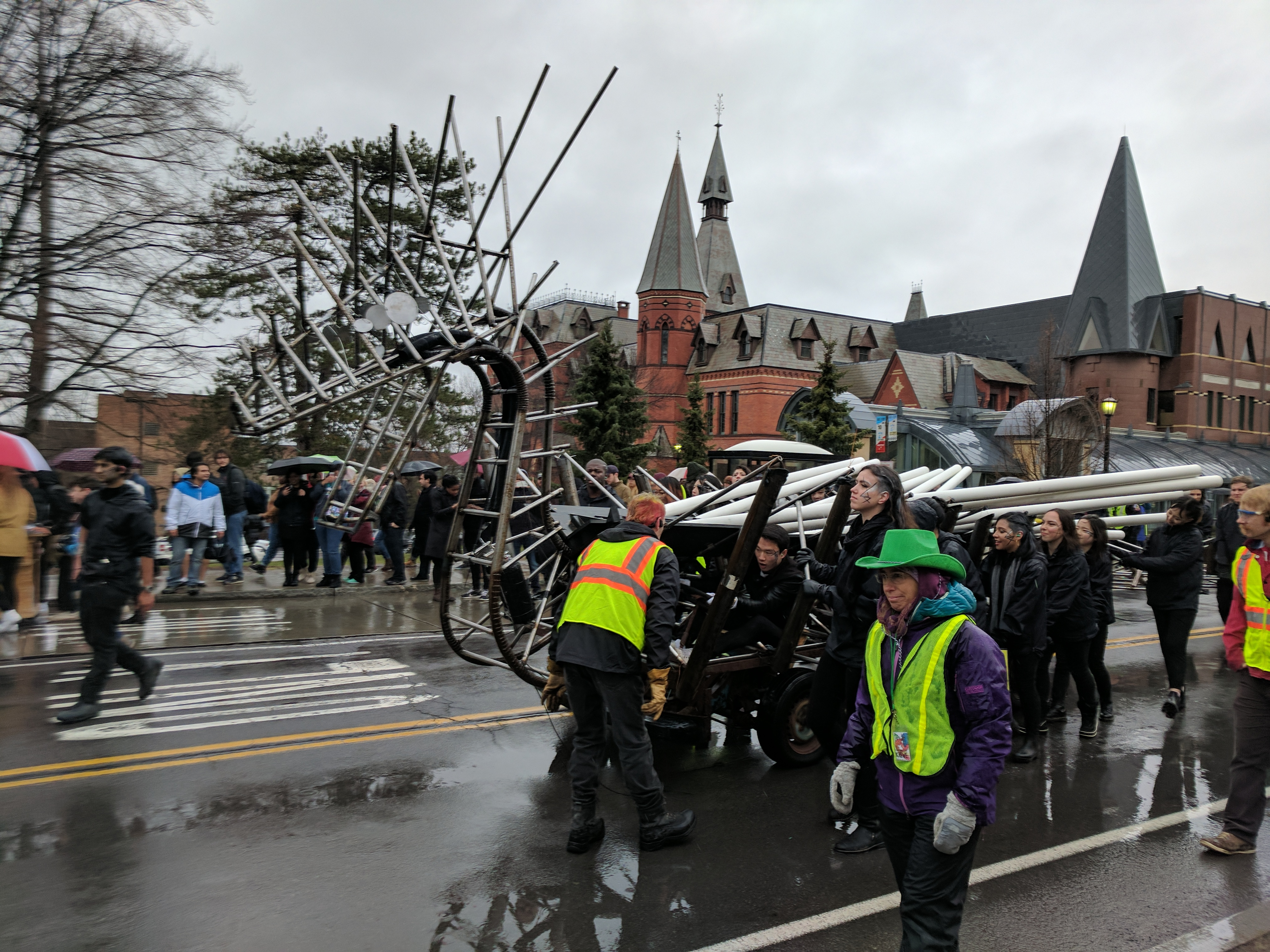
2017

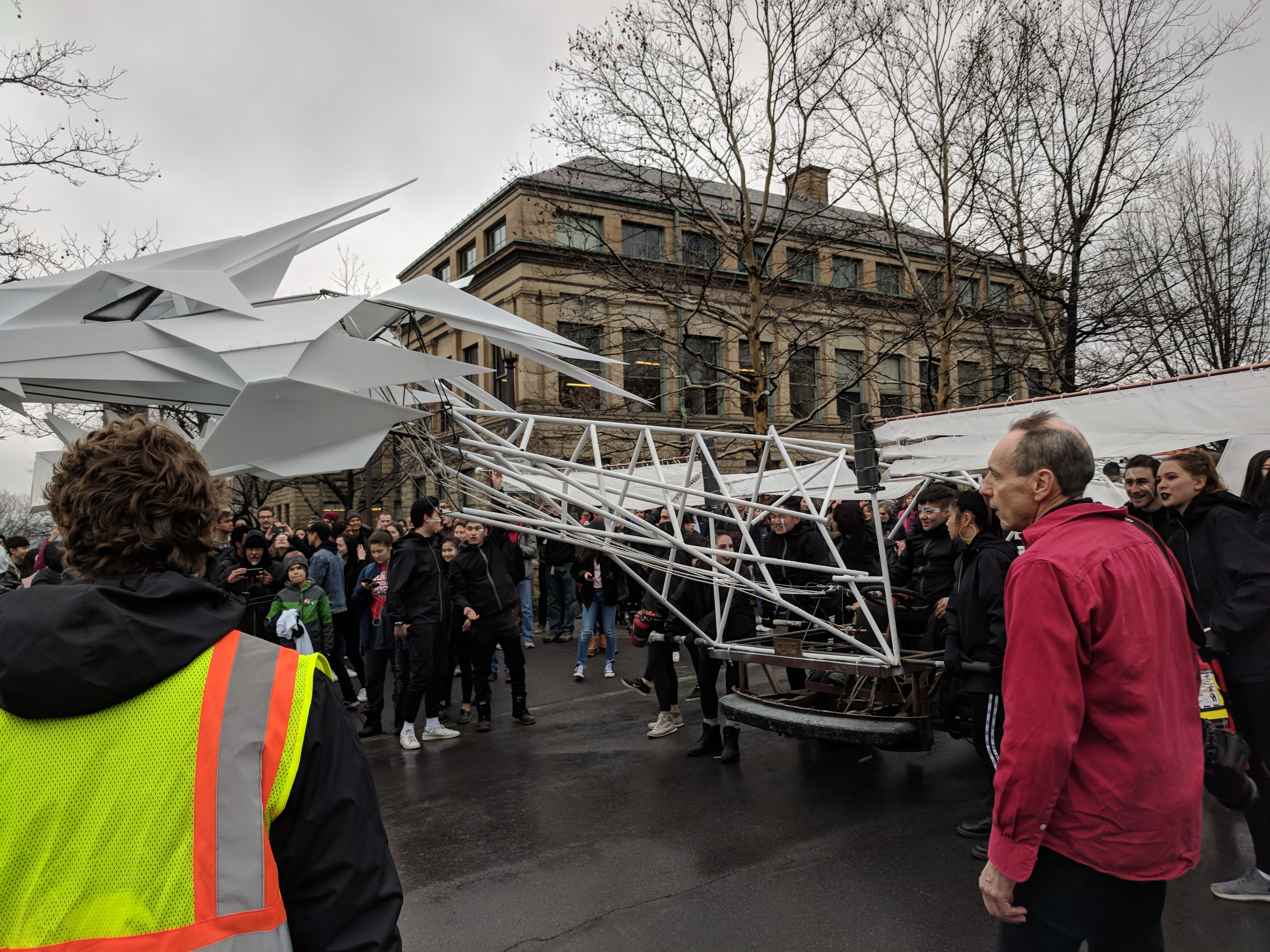
2018

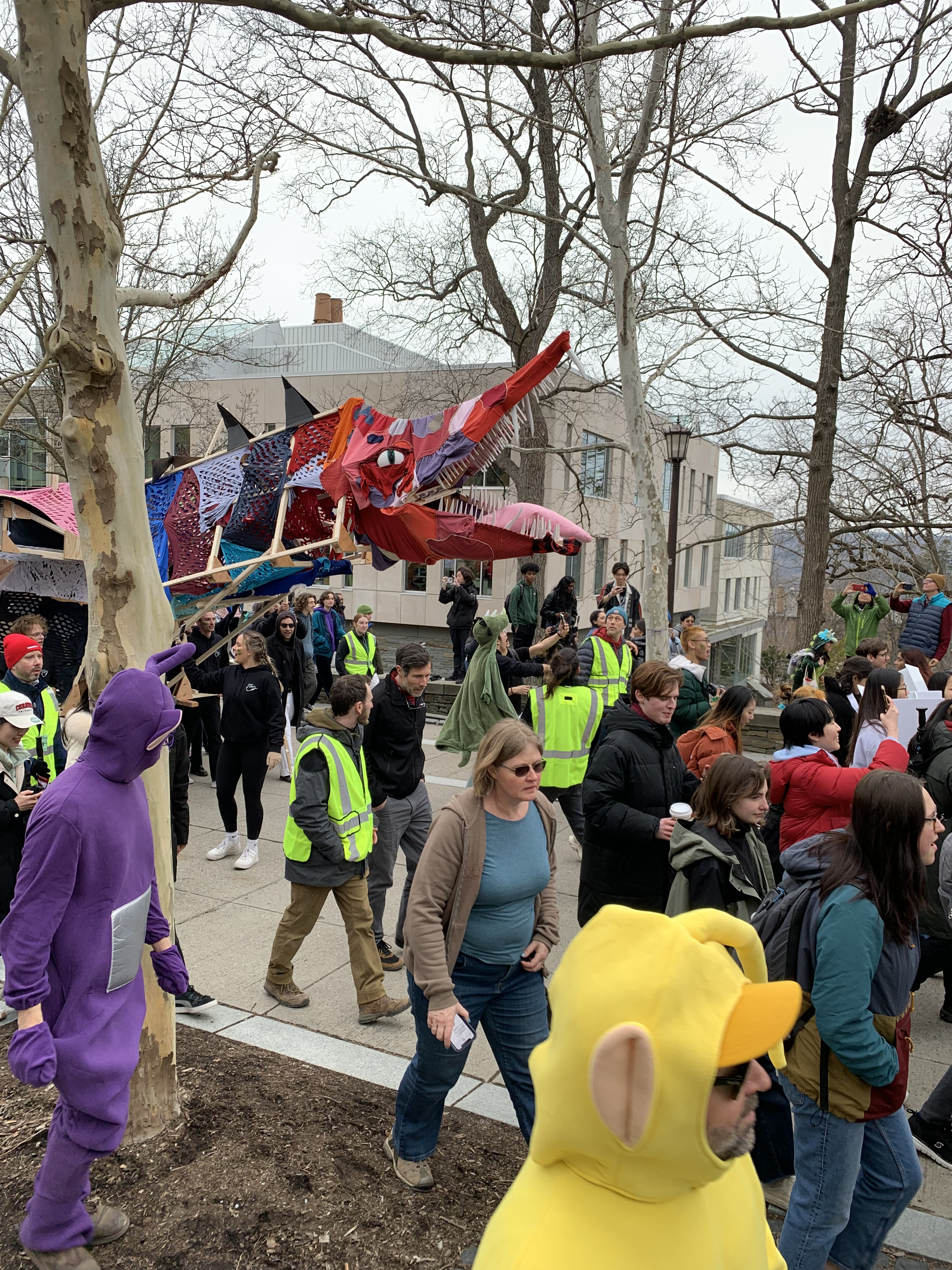
2023

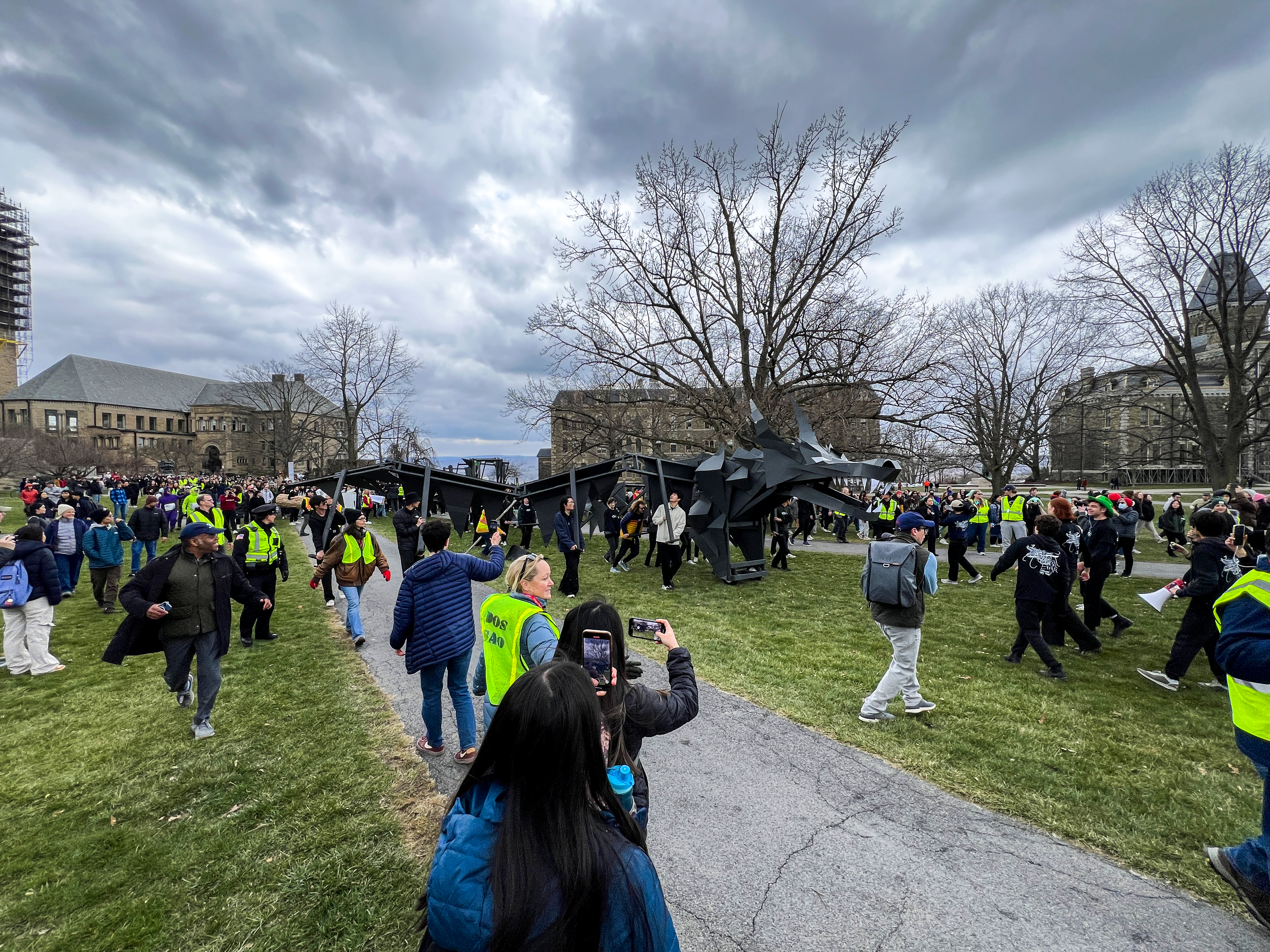
2024

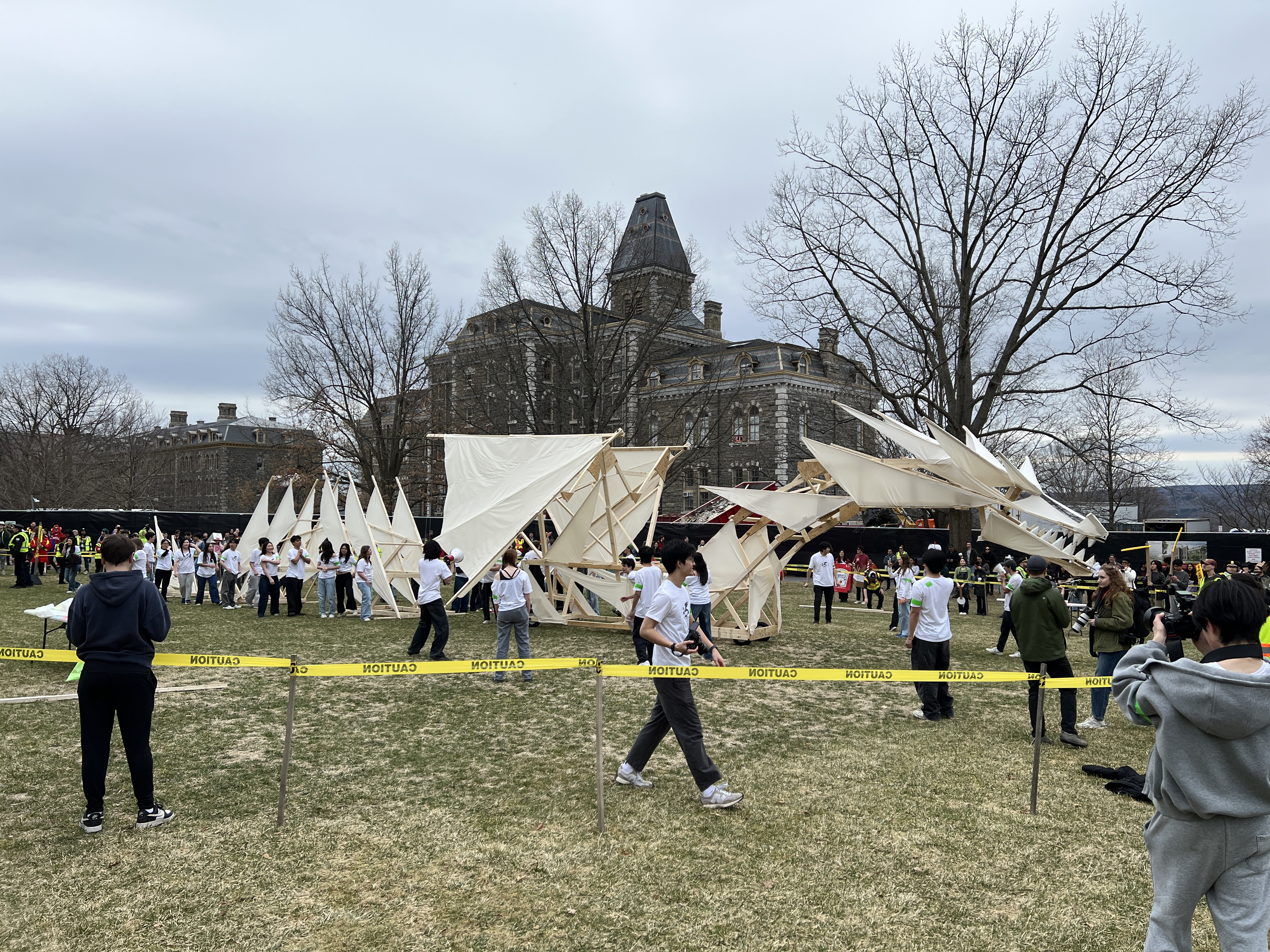
2025
