= Andrew Dickson White bibliography =

The bibliography of Andrew Dickson White spans his career from 1852, during his junior year at Yale University, through his death in 1918. The primary topics of his works were related to social sciences such as history, government, economics, and international relations. Secondary topics included architecture and educational theory.

== Works ==
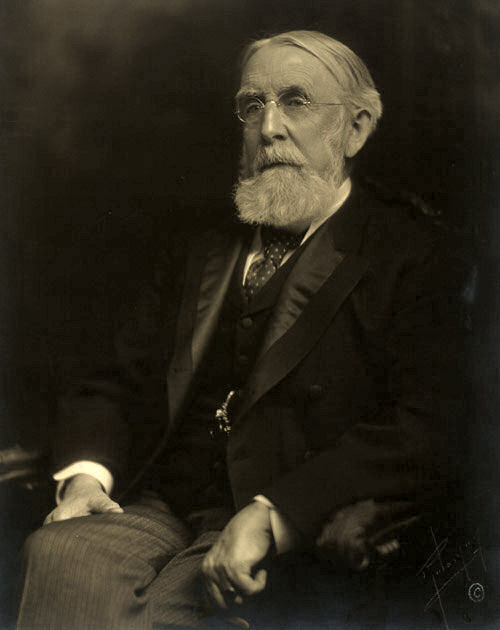

The Greater Distinctions in Statesmanship. Yale Literary Prize Essay, in the "Yale Literary Magazine," 1852.

The Diplomatic History of Modern Times. De Forest Prize Oration, in the "Yale Literary Magazine," 1853.

Qualifications for American Citizenship. Clarke Senior Prize Essay, in the "Yale Literary Magazine," 1853.

Editorial and other articles in the "Yale Literary Magazine," 1852-1853.

Glimpses of Universal History. The "New Englander," Vol. XV, p. 398.

Care of the Poor in New Haven. A Report to the Authorities of Syracuse, New York. The "Tribune," New York, 1857.

Cathedral Builders and Mediaeval Sculptors. An address before the faculty and students of Yale College, 1857. With various additions and revisions between that period and 1885. (Published only by delivery before various university and general audiences.)

Jefferson and Slavery. The "Atlantic Monthly," Vol. IX, p. 29.

The Statesmanship of Richelieu. The "Atlantic Monthly," Vol. IX, p. 611.

The Development and Overthrow of Serfdom in Russia. The "Atlantic Monthly," Vol. X, p. 538.

Outlines of Courses of Lectures on History, Mediaeval and Modern, given at the University of Michigan. Various editions, Ann Arbor and Detroit, 1858-1863; another edition, Ithaca, 1872.

A Word from the North West; being historical and political statements in response to strictures in the "American Diary" of Dr. W. H. Russell. London, 1862. The same, Syracuse, New York, 1863.

A Review of the Governor's Message. Speech in the State Senate, 1864, embracing sundry historical details. Albany, 1864.

The Cornell University. Speech in the State Senate. Albany, 1865.

Plea for a Health Department in the City of New York. A speech in the New York State Senate. Albany, 1866.

The Most Bitter Foe of Nations, and the Way to Its Permanent Overthrow. An address before the Phi Beta Kappa Society at Yale College, 1866. New Haven, 1866.

Report on the Organization of a University, with historical details based upon the history of advanced education, presented to the trustees of Cornell University, October, 1866. Albany, 1867.

Address at the Inauguration of the first President of Cornell University, with historical details regarding university education. Ithaca, 1869.

The Historical and part of the Political Details in the Report of the Commission to Santo Domingo in 1871. Washington, 1871.

Report to the Trustees of Cornell University on the Establishment of the Sage College for Women, with historical details regarding the education of women in the United States and elsewhere. First edition, Ithaca, 1872.

Address to the Students of Cornell University and to the Citizens of Ithaca Oil the Recent Attack upon Mr. Cornell in the legislature. Albany and New York, 1873.

The Greater States of Continental Europe (including Italy, six lectures; Spain, three lectures; Austria, four lectures; The Netherlands, sis lectures; Prussia, five lectures; Russia, five lectures; Poland, two lectures; The Turkish Power, three lectures; France, from the Establishment of French Unity in the Fifteenth Century to Richelieu, four lectures). Syllabus prepared for the graduating classes of Cornell University. Ithaca, the University Press, 1874.

An Address before the State Agricultural Society, at the Capitol in Albany, on "Scientific and Industrial Education in the United States," giving historical details regarding the development of education in pure and applied science. New York, 1874. Reprint of the same in the "Popular Science Monthly," June, 1874.

The Relations of the National and State Governments to Advanced Education. Paper read before the National Educational Association at Detroit, August 5, 1874. Published in "Old and New," Boston, 1874.

An Abridged Bibliography of the French Revolution, published as an appendix to O'Connor Morris's "History of the French Revolution." New York, 1875.

The Battle-fields of Science. An address delivered at the Cooper Institute, New York, and published in the "New York Tribune," 1875.

Paper Money Inflation in France: How it Came; What it Brought; and How it Ended. First edition, New York, 1876; abridged edition published by the New York Society for Political Education, 1882; revised edition with additions, New York, 1896 published under the title Fiat Money Inflation in France.

The Warfare of Science. First American edition, New York, 1876; first English edition, with Prefatory Note by Professor John Tyndall, London, 1876; Swedish translation, with Preface by H. M. Melin, Lund, 1877.

Syllabus of Lectures on the General Development of Penal Law; Development and Disuse of Torture in Procedure and in Penalty; Progress of International Law; Origin and Decline of Slavery; etc. Given before the senior class of Cornell University, 1878. (Published only by delivery.)

The Provision for Higher Instruction in Subjects bearing directly upon Public Affairs, being one of the Reports of the United States Commissioners to the Paris Universal Exposition of 1878. Washington, 1878. New edition of the same work, with additions and extensions by Professor Herbert B. Adams, Baltimore, 1887.

James A. Garfield. Memorial Address. Ithaca, 1881.

Do the Spoils belong to the Victor?—embracing historical facts regarding the origin and progress of the "Spoils System." The "North American Review," February, 1882.

Prefatory Note to the American translation of Muller, "Political History of Recent Times." New York, 1882.

The New Germany, being a paper read before the American Geographical Society at New York. New York, 1882. German translation, Frankfort-on-the-Main, 1882.

Two addresses at Cleveland, Ohio, October, 1882. First, On a Plan for the Western Reserve University. Second, On the Education of the Freedmen. Ithaca, 1882.

Outlines of Lectures on History. Addressed to the students of Cornell University. Part I, "The first Century of Modern History," Ithaca, the University Press, 1883. Part II, "Germany (from the Reformation to the new German Empire)," same place and date. Part III, "France" (including: 1. "France before the Revolution"; 2. "The French Revolution"; 3. "Modern France, including the Third Republic"), same place and date.

Speech at the Unveiling of the Portrait of the Honorable Justin S. Morrill. Ithaca, June, 1883.

The Message of the Nineteenth Century to the Twentieth. An address delivered before the class of 1853, in the chapel of Yale College, June 26, 1883. New Haven, 1883; second and third editions, New York, 1884.

Address at the First Annual Banquet of the Cornell Alumni of Western New York, at Buffalo, April, 1884.

What Profession shall I Choose, and how shall I Fit Myself for It? Ithaca, 1884.

Address at the Funeral of Edward Lasker. New York, 1884.

Address delivered at the Unveiling of the Statue of Benjamin Silliman at Yale College, June 24, 1884. New Haven, 1884; second edition, Ithaca, 1884.

Some Practical Influences of German Thought upon the United States. An address delivered at the Centennial Celebration of the German Society of New York, October 4, 1884. Ithaca, 1884.

Letter defending the Cornell University from Sundry Sectarian Attacks. Elmira, December 17, 1884.

Sundry Important Questions in Higher Education: Elective Studies, University Degrees, University Fellowships and Scholarships; with historical details and illustrations. A paper read at the Conference of the Presidents of the Colleges of the State of New York, at the Twenty-second University Convocation, Albany, 1884. Ithaca, 1885.

Studies in General History and the History of Civilization, being a paper read before the American Historical Association at its first public meeting, Saratoga, September 9, 1884. New York and London, 1885.

Instruction in the Course of History and Political Science at Cornell University. New York, 1885.

Yale College in 1853. "Yale Literary Magazine," February, 1886.

The Constitution and American Education, being a speech delivered at the Centennial Banquet, in the Academy of Music, Philadelphia, September 17, 1887. Ithaca, 1887.

A History of the Doctrine of Comets. A paper read before the American Historical Association at its second annual meeting, Saratoga, October, 1885. Published by the American Historical Association. New York and London, 1887. (This forms one of the "New Chapters in the Warfare of Science.")

New Chapters in the Warfare of Science: Meteorology. Reprinted from the "Popular Science Monthly," July and August, 1887. New York, 1887.

College Fraternities. An address given at the Metropolitan Opera House, New York, with some historical details. The "Forum," May, 1887.

New Chapters in the Warfare of Science: Geology. Reprinted from the "Popular Science Monthly," February and March, 1888. New York, 1888.

The Next American University. The "Forum," June, 1888.

The French Revolution. Syllabus of lectures, various editions, more or less extended and revised, for students at the University of Michigan; Cornell University; University of Pennsylvania; Johns Hopkins University; Columbian University; Tulane University; and Stanford University. Various places, and dates from 1859 to 1889.

The Need of Another University. The "Forum," January, 1889.

A University at Washington. The "Forum," February, 1889.

New Chapters in the Warfare of Science: Demoniacal Possession and Insanity. Reprinted from the "Popular Science Monthly," February and March, 1889.

New Chapters in the Warfare of Science: Diabolism and Hysteria. "Popular Science Monthly," May and June, 1889.

The Political Catechism of Archbishop Apuzzo. A paper read before, and published by, the American Historical Association, Washington. December, 1889.

My Reminiscences of Ezra Cornell. An address delivered before the Cornell University on Founder's Day, January 11, 1890. Ithaca, 1890.

Remarks on Indian Education. Proceedings of the Lake Mohonk Conference, 1890.

Evolution and Revolution. A commencement address before the University of Michigan, Ann Arbor, 1890.

The Teaching of History in our Public Schools. Remarks before the Fortnightly Club, Buffalo, 1890.

Democracy and Education. An address given before the State Teachers' Association at Saratoga, 1891. Published by the Department of Public Instruction, Albany, 1891.

The Problem of High Crime in the United States. Published only by delivery—before Stanford University in 1892, and, with various additions and revisions, before various other university and general audiences down to 1897.

The Future of the American Colleges and Universities. Published in "School and College Magazine," February, 1892.

A History of the Warfare of Science with Theology in Christendom. New York, 1896. French translation, Paris, 1899. Italian translation, Turin, 1902.

An Address at the Celebration of the Fiftieth Anniversary of the Onondaga Orphan Asylum. Syracuse, 1896.

Erasmus, in "The Library of the World's Best Literature." New York, 1896.

An Open letter to Sundry Democrats (Bryan Candidacy). New York, 1896.

Evolution vs. Revolution, in Politics. Biennial address before the State Historical Society and the State University of Wisconsin, February 9, 1897. Madison, Wisconsin, 1897.

Speech at a Farewell Banquet given by the German-Americans of New York. New York, 1897.

Sundry addresses at Berlin and Leipsic. Berlin, 1897-1902.

A Statesman of Russia-Pobedonostzeff. The "Century Magazine," 1898.

The President of the United States. Speech at Leipsic, Germany, July 4, 1898. Berlin, 1898.

Address before the Peace Conference of The Hague at the Laying of a Silver and Gold Wreath on the Tomb of Grotius at Delft, in Behalf of the Government of the United States, July 4, 1899. The Hague, 1899.

Walks and Talks with Tolstoy. "McClure's Magazine," April, 1901.

The Cardiff Giant: The True Story of a Remarkable Deception. The "Century Magazine" for October, 1902.

Farewell Address at Berlin, November 11, 1902. The "Columbia"magazine, Berlin, December, 1902; reprinted "Yale Alumni Weekly,"January 14, 1903.

Speech at the Bodleian Tercentenary, Oxford. "Yale Alumni Weekly," March 11, 1903.

A Patriotic Investment. An address at the fiftieth anniversary of the Yale class of 1853, New Haven, 1903.

Reminiscences of My Diplomatic Life. Various articles in the "Century Magazine," 1903-5.

The Warfare of Humanity with Unreason, including biographical essays on Fra Paolo Sarpi, Hugo Grotius, Christian Thomasius, and others. "Atlantic Monthly," 1903-5.

Speech at the Laying of the Corner-stone of Goldwin Smith Hall. Ithaca, N. Y., October 13, 1904. Published by the Cornell University, 1905.

The Situation and Prospect in Russia. "Collier's Weekly," February 11, 1905.

The Past, Present, and Future of Cornell University. An address delivered before the New York City Association of Cornell Alumni, February 25, 1905. Ithaca, 1905.

The American Diplomatic Service, with Hints for its Reform. An address delivered before the Smithsonian Association, Washington, D. C., March 9, 1905. Washington, 1905.
