= Assignat =

Monetary instrument during the French Revolution and Revolutionary Wars

An assignat ([asiɲa]) was a monetary instrument, an order to pay, used during the time of the French Revolution, and the French Revolutionary Wars.

== France ==
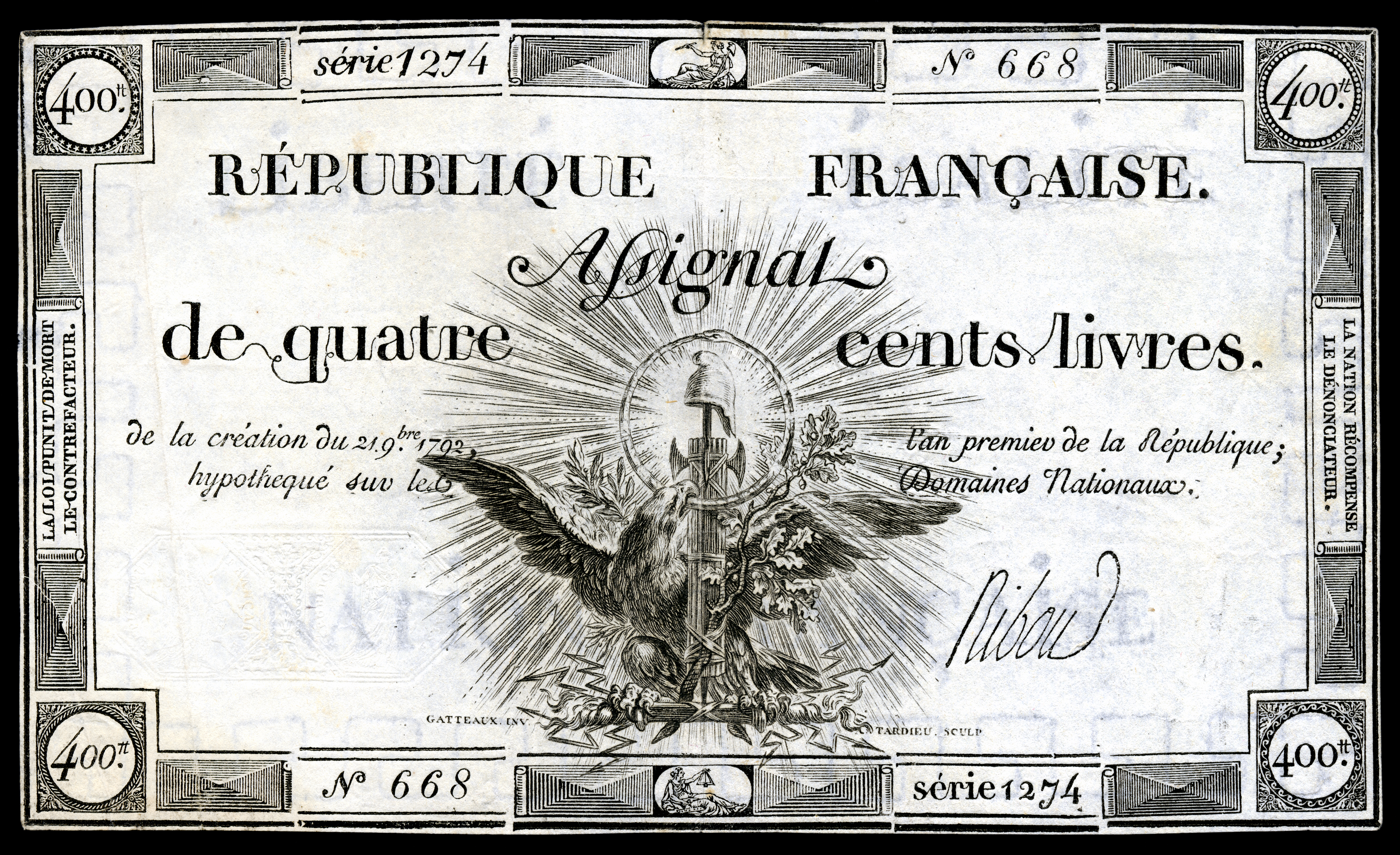
Assignat from the 1792 issue: 400 livres

Assignats were paper money (fiat currency) authorized by the Constituent Assembly in France from 1789 to 1796, during the French Revolution, to address imminent bankruptcy. They were originally backed by the value of properties now held by the nation; those of the crown taken over on 7 October, and those of the Catholic Church, which were confiscated, on the motion of Mirabeau, by the Assembly on 2 November 1789. Credit was wrecked, according to Talleyrand; for Mirabeau "the deficit was the treasure of the nation". In September the treasury was empty. Charles Maurice de Talleyrand-Périgord proposed "national goods" should be given back to the nation. Necker proposed to borrow from the Caisse d'Escompte, but his intention to change the private bank into a national bank similar to the Bank of England failed. A general default seemed certain. On 21 December 1789 a first decree was voted through, ordering the issue (in April 1790) of 400,000 livres' worth of assignats, certificates of indebtedness, with an interest rate of 5%, secured and repayable based on the auctioning of the "Biens nationaux". The assignats were immediately a source of political controversy. Constitutional monarchists such as Jean-Sifrein Maury, Jacques Antoine Marie de Cazalès, Nicolas Bergasse and Jean-Jacques Duval d'Eprémesnil opposed it. While their proponents, like other eighteenth-century advocates of "land banks," argued that land was a more stable source of value than was gold or silver, the assignats' opponents saw them as based on an illegitimate seizure of property.

The assignats were first to be paid to the creditors of the state. With these the creditors could purchase national land, the assignats having, for this purpose, the preference over other forms of money. If the creditor did not care to purchase land, it was supposed that he could obtain the face value for them from those who desired land. Those assignats which were returned to the state as purchase-money were to be cancelled, and the whole issue, it was argued, would consequently disappear as the national lands were distributed.

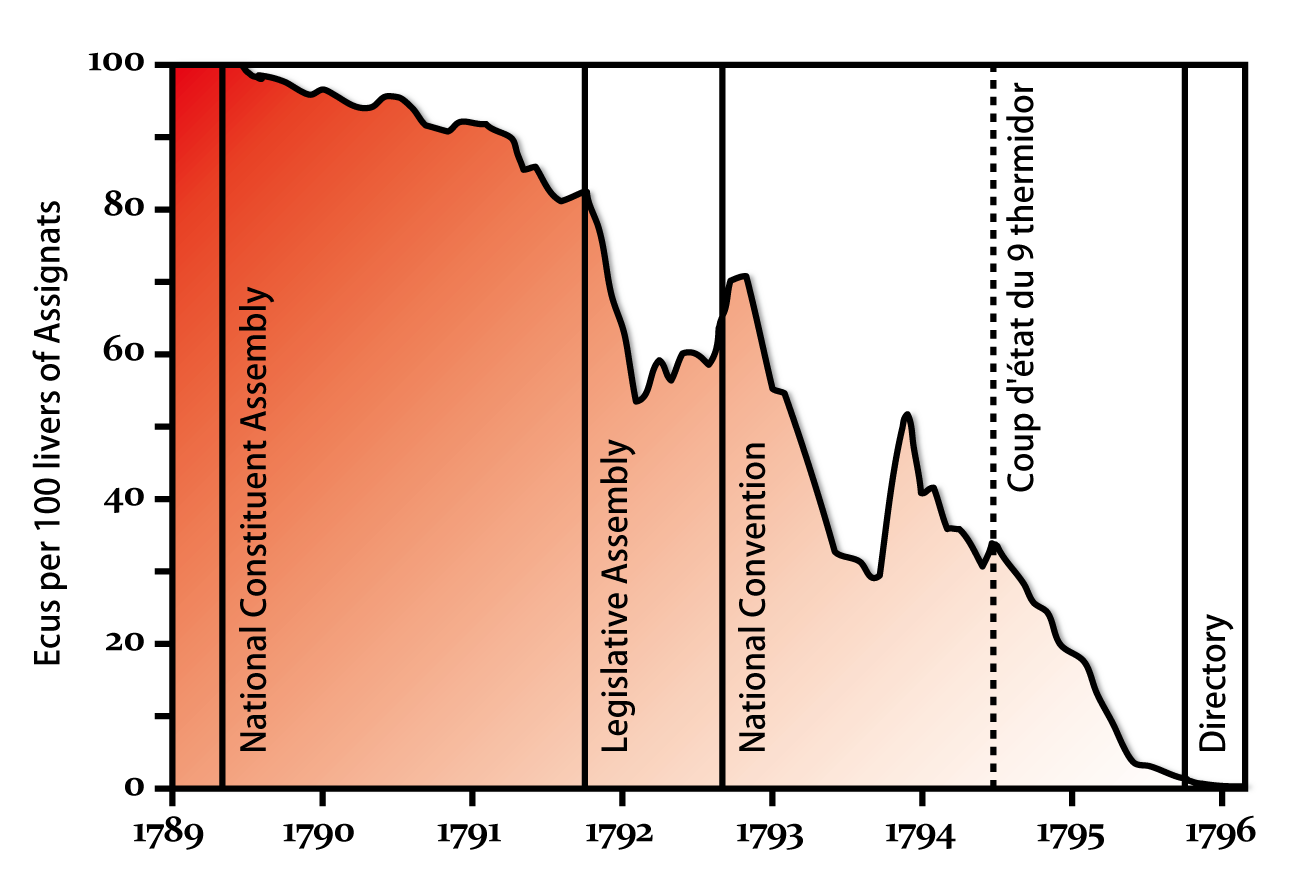
The value of Assignats (1789–1796)

Originally meant as bonds, the assignats were re-defined as legal tender (assignats-monnaie) in April 1790 to address the liquidity crisis provoked by the political, social, and cultural instability of the Revolution.

=== 1790–1792 ===
Étienne Clavière lobbied for large issues of assignats representing national wealth and operating as legal tender. On 17 April 1790, the notes were declared legal tender but their interest was reduced to 3%. For daily life smaller denominations of 200 and 300 livres were needed. The assignats would compensate for the scarcity of coin and would revive industry and trade. Once the assignats were paid, they had to be burnt. A surety was prepared for future issues of paper money. As soon as the assignats started to circulate, their value decreased by 5 percent. Du Pont de Nemours feared the emission of assignats would double the price of bread.

Jacques Necker himself argued at the National Assembly on 27 August that the assignats were a paper money which would bankrupt France. Talleyrand had also attacked them on the grounds that they risked the same fate as John Law's schemes. Camus stressed what he believed was the lesson of American experience of paper, which had undermined metal money and sent prices spiralling. Nicolas de Condorcet and Pierre Samuel du Pont de Nemours argued that the assignats would drive out silver and other forms of coin, raise prices relative to paper, and thereby dangerously restrict commerce. All of these writers preferred the issue of treasury bills at interest through the Caisse d'Escompte, a revised tax-system, and increased loans.

On 27 August 1790 the Assembly decided another issue of 1,9 billion assignats which would become legal tender before the end of the year for all actions, c.q. banknotes, which could be acquired by anyone and used for ordinary business transactions. Necker, suspected of reactionary tendencies, resolutely against the transformation of the assignat into paper currency, handed in his resignation on 3 September. The massive and dangerous issue of 1,9 billion he succeeded to get down to 800 million, but the attacks may have influenced his resignation. Necker was not backed by Comte de Mirabeau, his strongest opponent who called for "national money".

By September 1790, all authorized assignats had been paid out by the government. Supporters of the paper money argued that since the assignats were secured by land, more notes could be safely issued as long as they were retired and burned at the same rate that the lands securing them were sold. On 29 September 1790, the National Assembly authorized a further issue of 800 million livres and abolished interest on the assignats altogether.)

Necker foretold that the paper money, with which the dividends were about to be paid, would soon be of no value. Since no one had truly the right to make assignats, everyone would soon begin to do so. Montesquiou-Fézensac, charged with the issue of assignats, feared stockjobbing and greed.

By September 1790, the assignat had become a true circulating paper currency, and 800 million livres worth of non-interest bearing notes were added to the initial issue, in denominations of 50, 60 70, 80, 90, 100, 500, and 2000 livres with legal-tender status. The lower denominations were produced in large numbers in order to ensure wide circulation. This change stimulated the economy but also increased inflationary pressures.

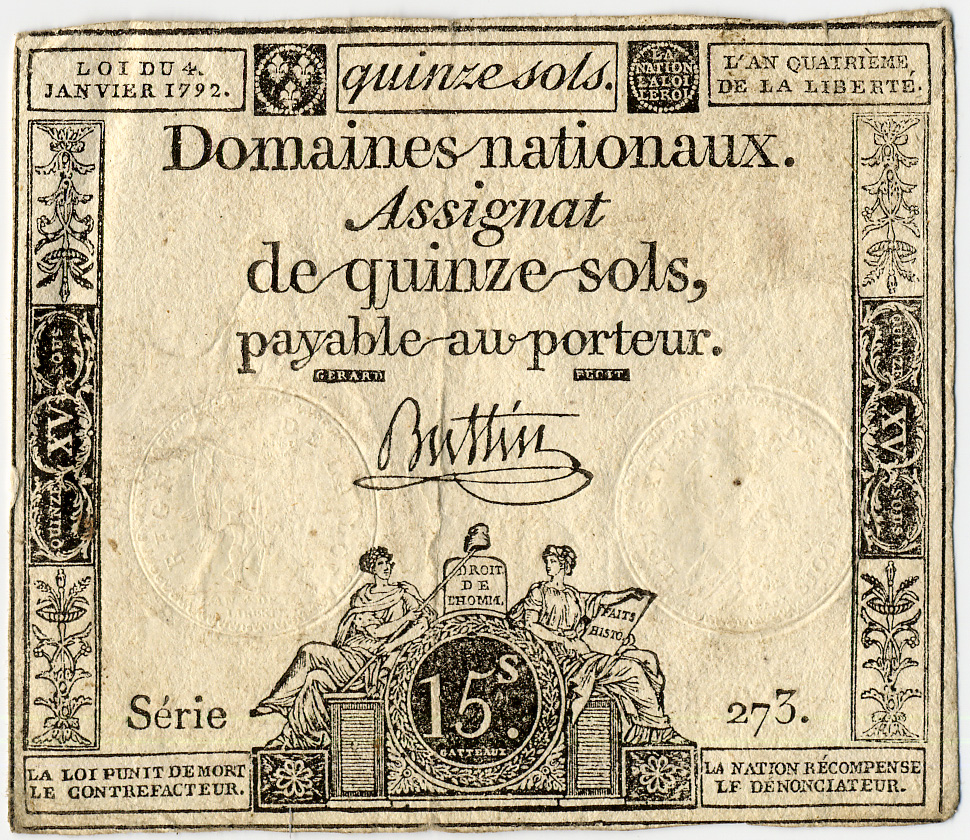
Assignat of 4 Jan 1792, still bearing Royal markings: 15 sols

When the cost of reimbursing Old Regime venal office holders for their properties (judgeships, military ranks etc.) added yet more to the Revolution's inherited debts, the National Assembly voted by a narrow margin to issue additional assignats in September 1790, initially of an additional 800 million francs. By September 1791, the value of the assignats had depreciated by 18–20 percent.

The properties backing the assignats were renamed biens nationaux ("national goods") and auctioned by district-level authorities. On 10 March 1790, on the proposition Pétion, the administration of the church property was transferred to the municipalities. Through the sale of these properties, assignats were used to successfully retire a significant portion of the national debt. However, since these land sales were their original intent, the assignats were issued only in large denominations (50, 100, 200, and 1000 livres) that worked poorly as a daily medium of exchange. Moreover, the National Assembly never mandated that assignats and Old Regime coins (which remained in circulation) had to be exchanged on par. Already in fall 1790, the National Assembly itself was paying a 7.5% commission to exchange large denomination assignats for smaller coins. By the end of 1791, the discount rate was often 20% or more. These limits on the bills' practical use, and further issues eventually totalling 3.75 billion francs, coupled with the organized opposition of counter-revolutionaries, led to their losing value. On 1 February 1792 the assignats depreciated almost with 50%. Patriotic revolutionaries blamed the assignats' depreciation on foreign conspiracies. Clavière held the coalition of states responsible for the collapse of the assignat. Stephen D. Dillaye, an American politician who referred to monetary policy history, wrote that the British, Belgian, and Swiss counterfeited the currency industrially: "Seventeen manufacturing establishments were in full operation in London, with a force of four hundred men devoted to the production of false and forged Assignats." On 17 October 1792, no less than 2,400 million assignations were in circulation.

=== 1793–1799 ===
After the outbreak of war, the fall of the monarchy, and the declaration of a Republic, the National Convention mandated that bills and coins exchange on par, but this law could never be enforced. Instead, the assignats continued depreciating. On 10 April 1793 Robespierre accused Dumouriez in a speech: "Dumouriez and his supporters have brought a fatal blow to the public fortune, preventing circulation of assignats in Belgium". An assignat note of 100 livres had fallen in May 1793 to 52 per cent of its face value and plunged to 36 per cent the following month.

Counterfeiting of assignats was widespread, both in France and abroad. Researchers have documented how French royalists worked with British authorities, including senior ministers and military commanders, to manufacture paper for counterfeit assignats at mills across England, after which the paper was distributed across various locations for printing. By August 1793 the amount of assignats in circulation had doubled to 5 billion. Rising prices and food shortages exacerbated public unrest in September. Bills such as the Maximum Price Act of 1793 aimed to address this situation.

On 8 November 1793 the director of the manufacture of assignats fr:Simon-François Lamarche was executed. On 2 December Clavière was arrested; he committed suicide within a week. On 24 February 1794 the extension of the "maximum" to all commodities only increased the confusion. Trade was paralysed and all manufacturing establishments were closed down.

=== June 1794 ===
By June 1794 the total number of assignats aggregated nearly 8 billion, of which only 2,464 million had returned to the treasury and been destroyed, after an emission of 1,205 million assignats on 19 June; the assignat was losing more and more value. In August, the Thermidorian Convention lifted the Maximum Price Act in the name of "economic freedom" and the assignats lost almost all value over the next year. Toward the end of 1794 seven billion in assignats were in circulation. The assignat fell from 31% of its face value in August 1794 to 24% in November, 17% in February, and 8% in April 1795. By the end of May, 1795, the circulation was increased to ten billion, at the end of July, to fourteen billion. By 1796 the issues had reached 45.5 billion francs, excluding counterfeits, and the Directoire issued Mandats, a currency in the form of land warrants to replace the assignats, although these too quickly failed and were received back by the state at a steep discount. Napoleon opposed all forms of fiat currency. By the 1830s–1840s, the assignats and other papers issued during the Revolution had become collector's items.

== Italy ==
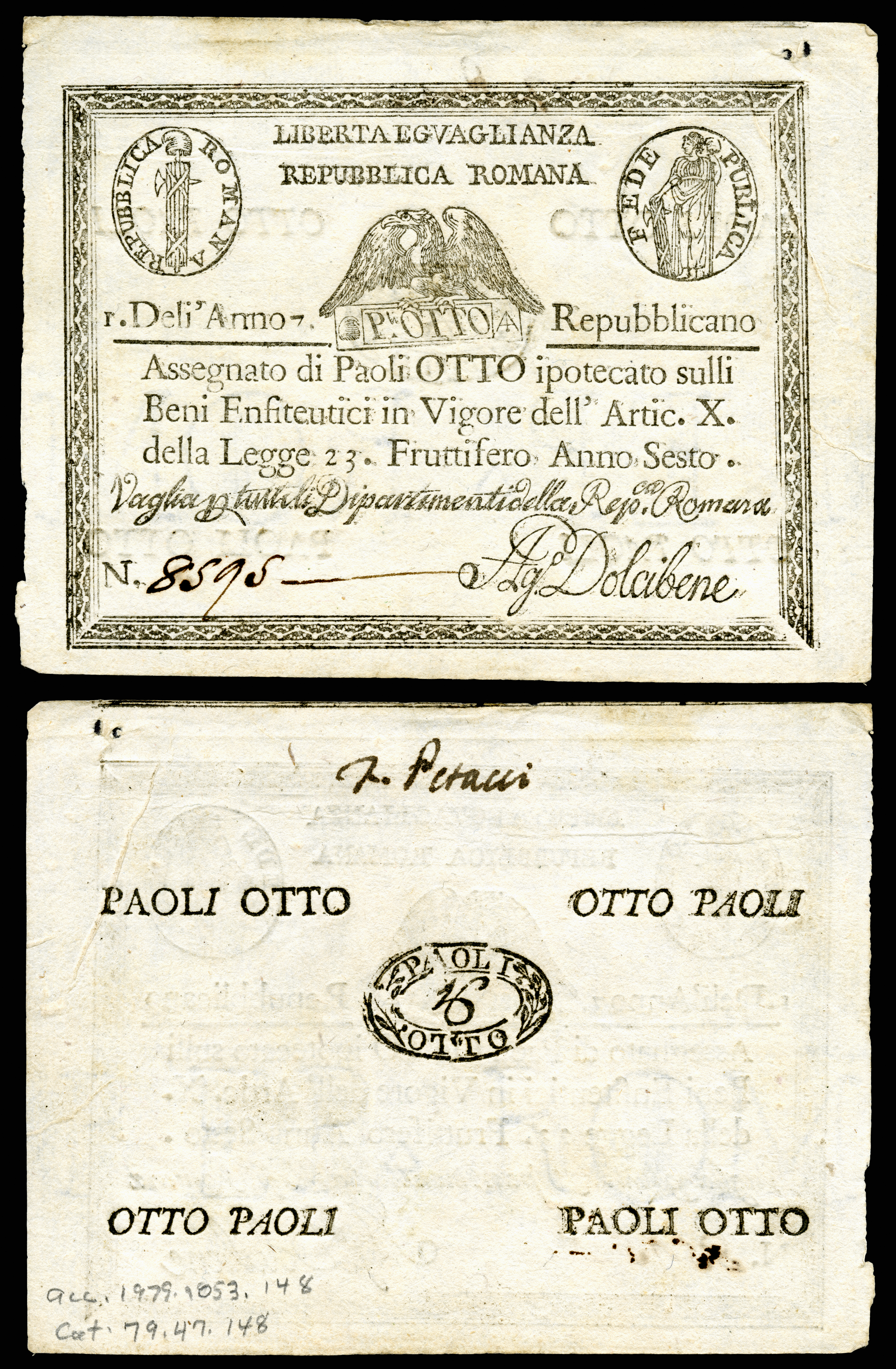
An eight-paoli Roman Republic assignat (1798).

Between 1798 and 1799, the revolutionary French forces established the Roman Republic, which also issued assignats (Italian: assegnati). They were issued by the law of 23 Fructidor VI (14 Sept 1798). The currency used was paolo or giulio, the older currency of the Papal States. Roman Republic also issued coins denominated in baiocco and scudo.

== Russia ==
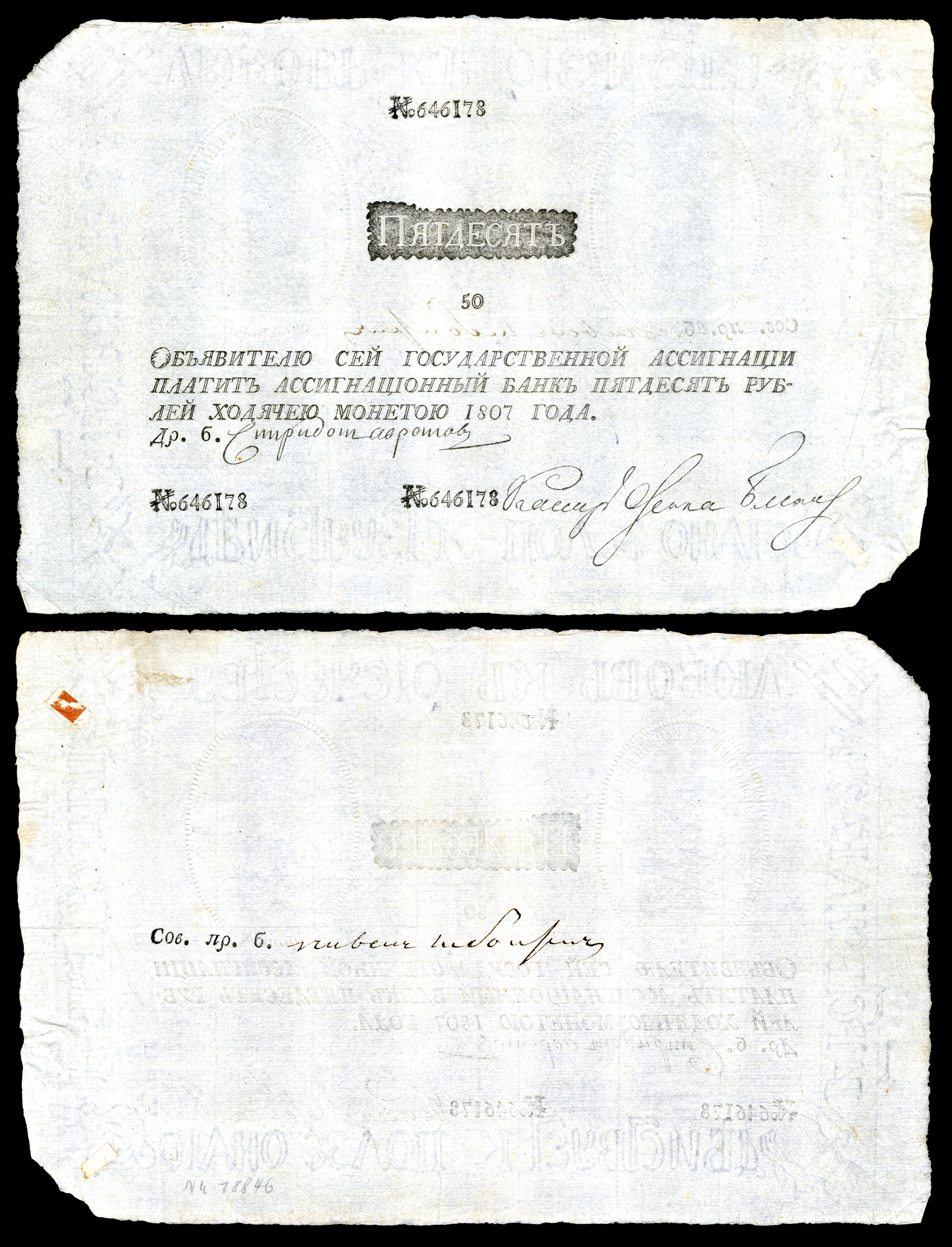
Russian assignation ruble (1807)

The term assignat is similar to the Russian word assignatsia which means "banknote". Assignatsionny rubl (assignation ruble) was used in Russia from 1769 until 1 January 1849. This had no connection to the French Revolution.

== See also ==
- Warrant of payment
- Fiat Money Inflation in France
