= Helen Magill White =

American classicist. (1853–1944)

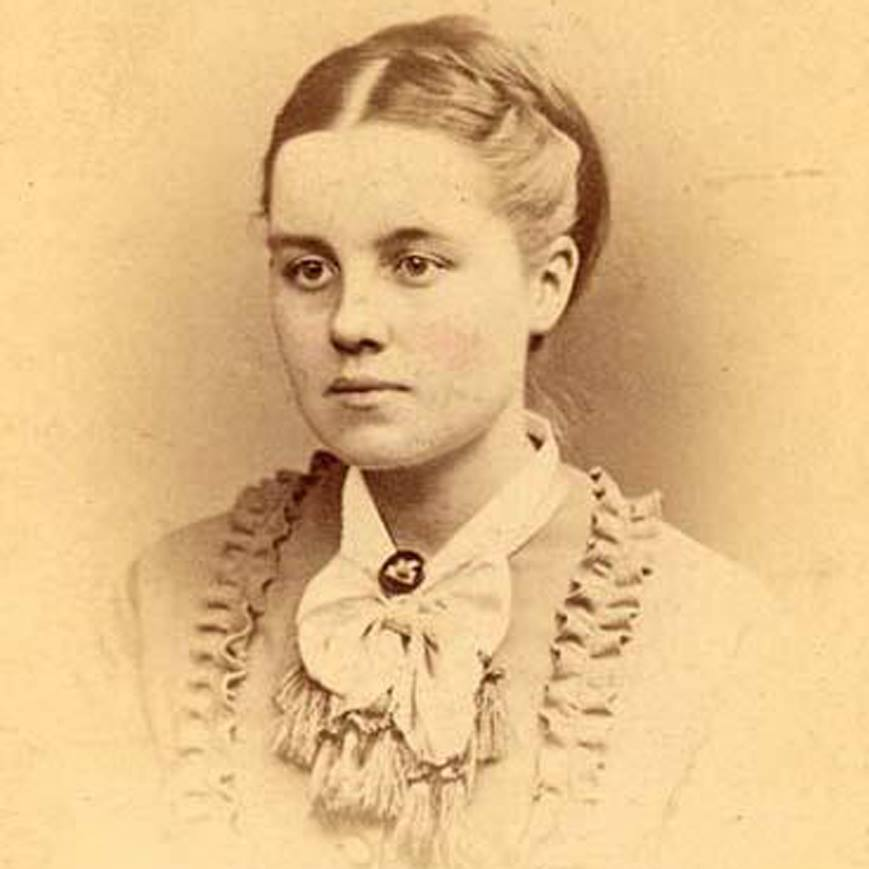
- White in 1873
- Born: November 28, 1853; Providence, Rhode Island, U.S.
- Died: October 28, 1944 (aged 90); Kittery Point, Maine, U.S.
- Education: Swarthmore College (BA); Boston University (MA, PhD); Newnham College, Cambridge
- Known for: First American woman Ph.D.
- Spouse: Andrew D. White
- Children: 3

Helen Magill White (November 28, 1853 – October 28, 1944) was an American classicist and academic. She was the first woman to earn a Ph.D. in the United States.

== Early life and education ==
Helen Magill was born in Providence, Rhode Island, to Edward Hicks Magill and Sarah Warner Beans. She was the eldest of six children in a Quaker family. Magill was brought up to believe that she deserved the same education as a man and all five Magill daughters were educated to become college teachers. In 1859, the family moved to Boston, Massachusetts, where Magill enrolled as the only female student in the Boston Public Latin School. Her father taught French and Latin there for three years, and he was promoted to submaster.

In 1869, Magill's father joined the faculty of the new Swarthmore College which was founded by Quakers in Swarthmore, Pennsylvania, near Philadelphia. Magill enrolled as an undergraduate. In 1871 her father was selected as the college's second president, serving for 17 years. The younger Magill graduated as a member of the Class of 1873, Swarthmore's first graduating class (five women and one man).

Magill attended graduate school at Boston University, earning her Ph.D. in Greek in 1877. She was the first woman to earn a PhD in the United States. Magill traveled to England, studying at the University of Cambridge. Due to an illness, Magill received only a third rank in her 1881 tripos honors examinations at Newnham College, which negatively impacted her academic career.

Magill's dissertation, The Greek Drama, was long considered lost, but in 2018 it was found in her papers in the Rare Book and Manuscript Collections, Cornell University Library.

== Career ==
After serving as the principal for a year at a private school in Johnstown, Pennsylvania, Magill was selected on the recommendation of Edward Everett Hale to organize Howard Collegiate Institute in West Bridgewater, Massachusetts in 1883. Howard was a non-sectarian school for about 40 women and Magill had the authority to choose teachers and conduct college courses. Magill's father contributed funds for a laboratory and gymnasium and two of Magill's sisters taught courses. Although the school expanded rapidly (and therefore needed a new building to accommodate students), Magill resigned in 1887 due to family reasons and due to a dispute with the trustees over her campaign for the provision of better sewerage.

Magill taught for a short amount of time at Evelyn College for Women, a women's annex to Princeton University. Suffering from an illness, she taught physical geography at Brooklyn High School for a few years.

== Personal life ==
Helen Magill met Andrew D. White in 1887 while she was presenting a paper about her time at Newnham College at the American Social Science Association. A college classmate of Magill's father, White was retired from his many years as first president of Cornell University. He had been widowed that year. White described Magill and her paper in his diary as:

"Perfect manner & exquisite voice – altogether a triumph for this little Quakeress – daughter of my college mate Magill – of which I am proud."

White encouraged Magill to apply for the post of Director of Sage College for Women at Cornell University. Magill however had been shaken by her experience of directorship of the Howard Collegiate Institute and depression and illness kept her at home for some time. While teaching at Brooklyn High School, Magill maintained a correspondence with White where she commented on her perceived failings:

"but it makes me miserable sometimes to think what I might have already done, if I had produced more and criticized less." (May 15, 1888)

Magill and White married in September 1890, and had three children, Edward Magill White (d. 1896), Hilda White (1891–1892), and Karin Andreevna White (1893–1971).

Magill accompanied her husband when he was appointed to diplomatic posts in St. Petersburg (1892–94) and Berlin (1897–1903). Magill was presented at both courts and was a noted conversationalist, discussing architecture, sculpture, music, and literature with Kaisar Wilhelm II. Following the family's return to the United States, Magill did not participate in public or academic life any further.

After Andrew D. White died in 1918, Magill lived abroad and in Ithaca, New York. She retired to Kittery Point, Maine, where she died in 1944.

== Other pursuits ==
Helen Magill White published a letter in 1913 explaining her refusal to donate to a women's suffrage organization. However, some historians believe she was expressing her opposition to the actions of the Women's Social and Political Union in England, rather than to the suffrage cause. The Union's militant acts included burning churches, bombing homes, and sending letter bombs to public officials.
