= Andrew Dickson White House =

Historic house in New York, United States

- White, Andrew Dickson, House
- U.S. National Register of Historic Places
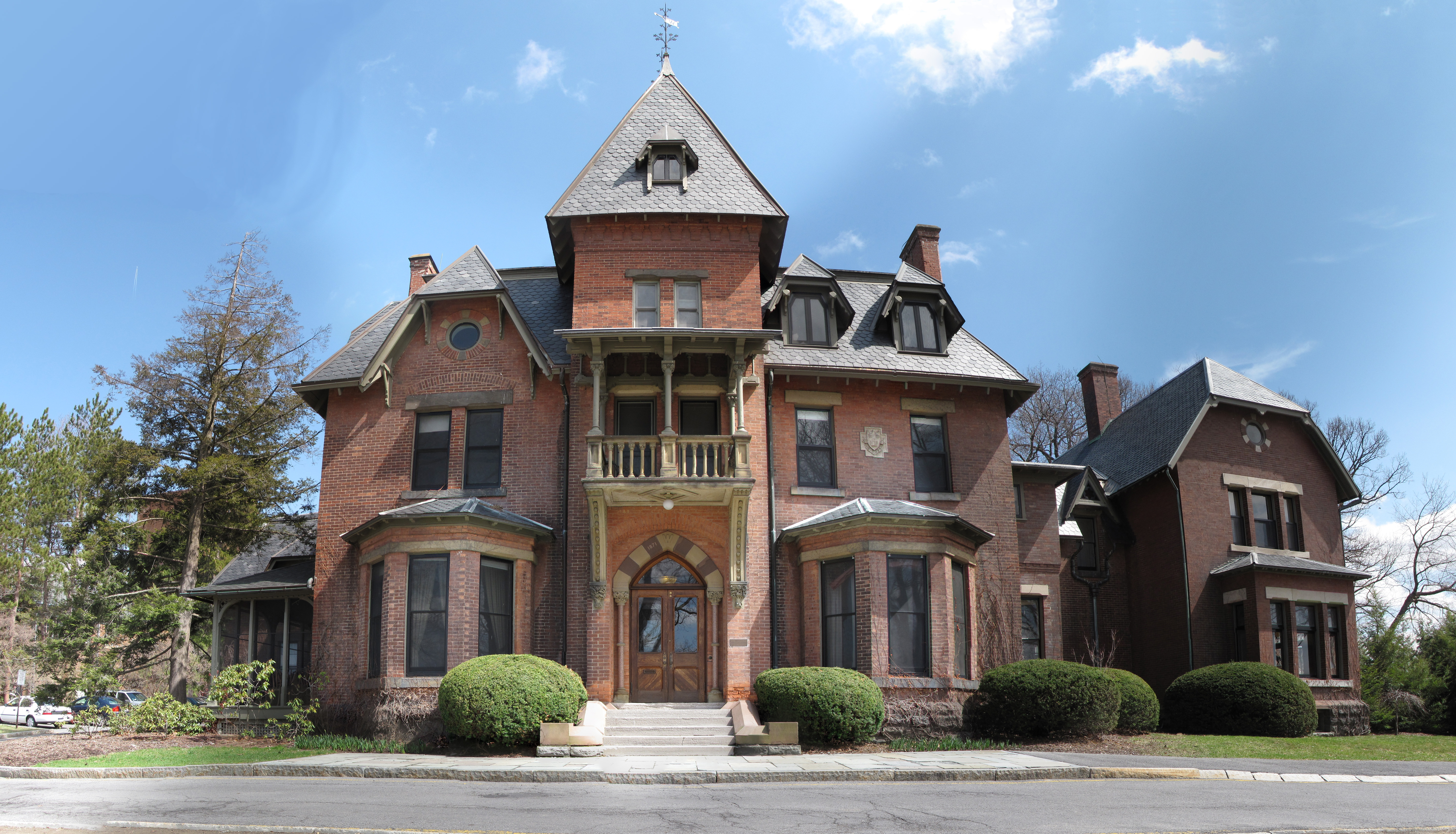
- White's mansion

- Location within New York Location within the United States
- Location: Ithaca, New York
- Coordinates: 42°26′53.78″N 76°28′56.73″W
- Built: 1871
- Architect: William Henry Miller; Charles Babcock
- Architectural style: Gothic
- NRHP reference No.: 73001278
- Added to NRHP: December 4, 1973

The Andrew Dickson White House, commonly referred to as the A.D. White House, is a High Victorian Gothic academic building and former presidential mansion on the campus of Cornell University. It was designed by architects William Henry Miller and Charles Babcock. and currently houses the Cornell University Society for the Humanities.

Commissioned in 1871 by Andrew Dickson White, co-founder and first president of Cornell University, the house features elaborate stone carvings reflecting White's aesthetic preferences. White intended the house to serve as both a residence and a source of artistic inspiration for students. Upon his death, he bequeathed the house to the university for the use of future presidents. While no longer serving as a primary residence, the study on the southeast side remains available as a private office and retreat for university presidents.

In 1953, the building was repurposed as the University Art Museum, with its former carriage house converted into the Big Red Barn, a graduate student lounge. The house remained an art museum until 1973, when it was considered for demolition. Henry Guerlac, then director of the Society for the Humanities, advocated for its preservation, leading to its inclusion on the National Register of Historic Places in 1973. The house’s library, now known as the Guerlac Room, was named in his honor. Following the opening of the Herbert F. Johnson Museum of Art, the White House transitioned to housing offices for the Society for the Humanities.
