= Fiat Money Inflation in France =

Historical essay by American diplomat, educator, and historian Andrew Dickson White

Fiat Money Inflation in France: How It Came, What It Brought, and How It Ended
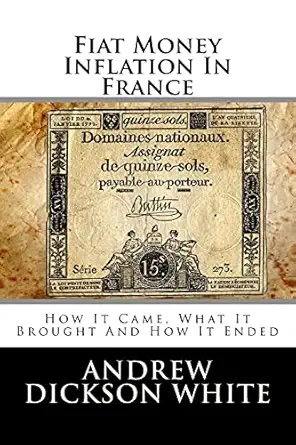
- Cover of the book "Fiat Money Inflation in France"
- Author: Andrew Dickson White
- Language: English
- Subject: Hyperinflation, Assignat, French Revolution
- Published: New York
- Publisher: D. Appleton & Company
- Publication date: 1896
- Publication place: United States
- Media type: Print
- Pages: 102
- ISBN: 9781684221073
- LC Class: LCCN 06043173

Fiat Money Inflation in France is a historical essay by American diplomat, educator, and historian Andrew Dickson White. First published in 1876 and expanded in later editions, the work chronicles the monetary turmoil during the French Revolution, focusing on the issuance and collapse of the paper currency known as the assignat, also describing the Mandats territoriaux.

== Summary ==
White presents the French Revolution’s experiment with the assignat as a cautionary tale of fiat currency unbacked by specie. Initially introduced to ease fiscal pressures and stimulate economic recovery, the assignats were nominally backed by confiscated church lands. But as the government resorted to repeated over-issuance, public confidence collapsed, and the assignats rapidly depreciated, leading to inflation, hoarding, shortages, and widespread economic dislocation.

White also discusses the brief and unsuccessful attempt to restore trust in paper currency through the issuance of the Mandats territoriaux, which quickly lost value and were rejected by the public. He emphasizes the moral and political consequences of inflation, arguing that the unchecked issuance of fiat money erodes public trust, undermines civil society, and compels governments toward increasingly coercive measures. The work draws parallels between revolutionary France and modern economies, warning that even well-intentioned policies can lead to disaster when monetary discipline is abandoned.

== Reception ==
The book has been reprinted many times and remains widely cited in discussions of fiat currency, inflation, and economic crises. It is often recommended by advocates of sound money policies, including those in the Austrian School of economics, for its vivid historical narrative and warning against inflationary finance.
