= Mandats territoriaux =

Mandats territoriaux (sing. mandat territorial) were paper government notes issued as currency by the French Directory in 1796 to replace the assignats which had become virtually worthless. They were land-warrants supposedly redeemable in the lands confiscated from royalty, the clergy and the church after the outbreak of the French Revolution in 1789. In February 1796, 800,000,000 francs of mandats were issued as legal tender to replace the 24,000,000,000 francs of assignats then outstanding. In all about 2,500,000,000 francs of mandats were issued. They were heavily counterfeited and their value depreciated rapidly within six months. In February 1797, they lost their legal tender quality and by May were worth virtually nothing.

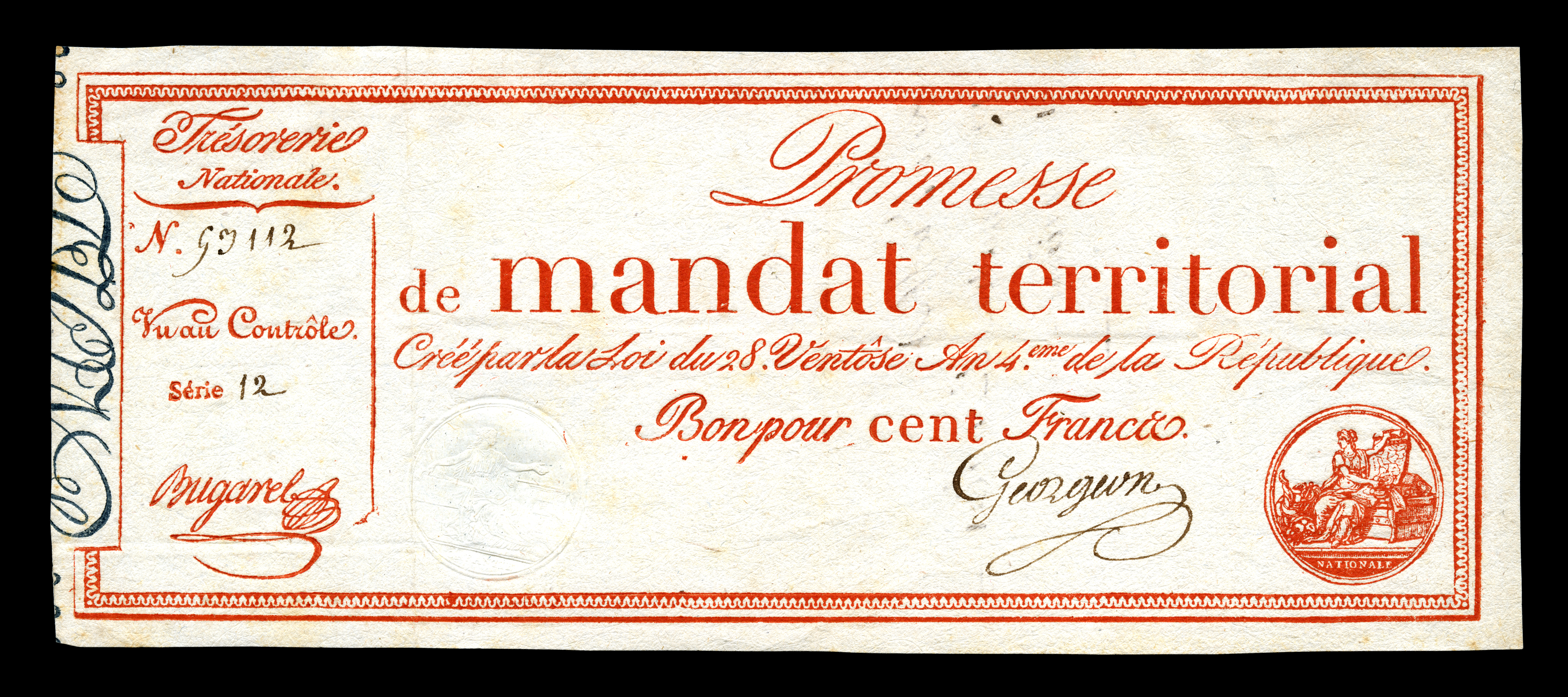
100 Francs

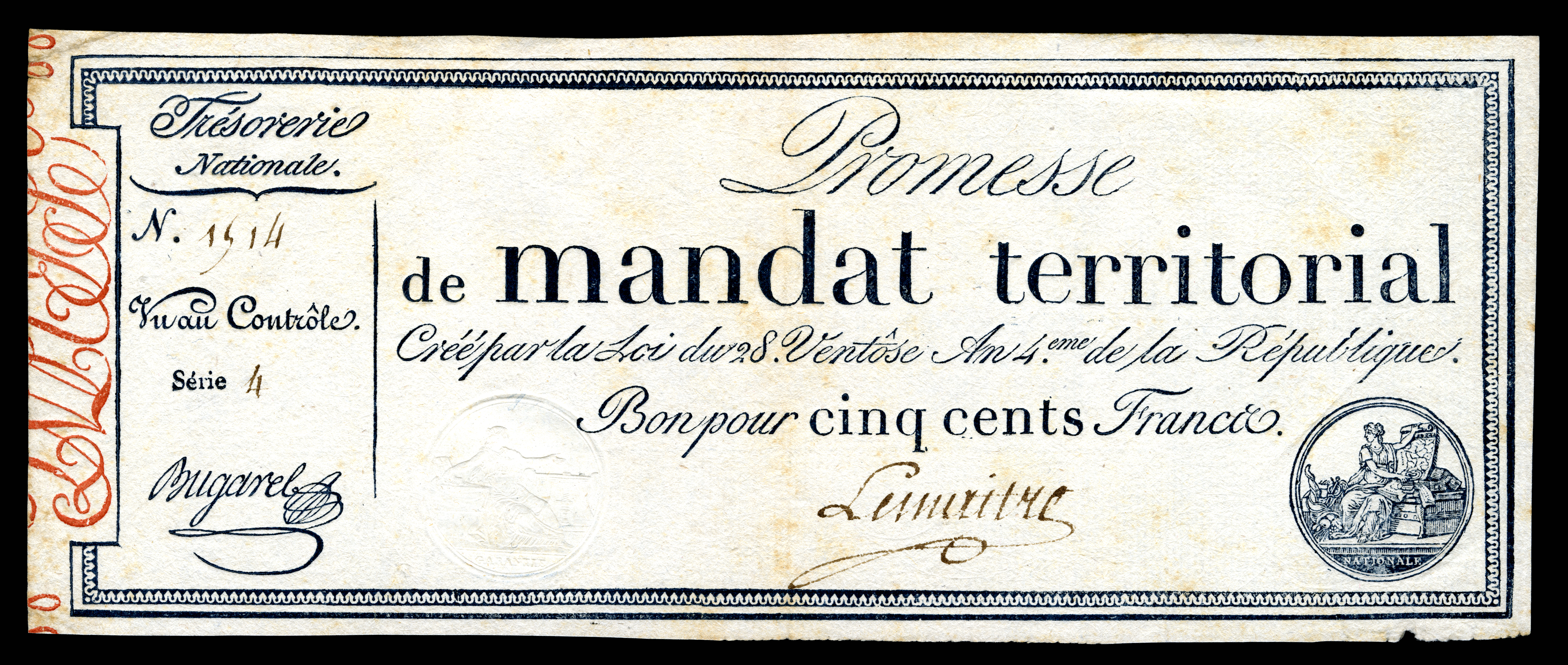
500 Francs

== Context ==
Throughout most of the French Revolution economic instability fueled by inflation, speculation, and disruption of resources and supplies created incredible hardship for average French citizens. The Revolutionary government depended on printing new paper money to fund its operation, which encouraged inflation. The mandats territoriaux was the second paper currency put into circulation by Revolutionary France, it followed the assignats. The cost of basic goods rose out of reach for the urban poor causing severe poverty. Exponential inflation resulted in the assignat being rejected or traded dramatically below face value. Inflation rose throughout 1795 reaching peak levels in October. The Directory attempted to intervene by decree on 23 and 24 December by limiting the total issue of assignats to 40 billion livres. Upon reaching the limit the printing presses and plates would be destroyed, which came to fruition on 19 February 1796. One month later the mandats territoriaux were created to replace the assignats.

=== Currency theory in Revolutionary France ===
For contemporaries of the French Revolution the glut of assignats and their loss of value were viewed as a leading cause of economic turmoil. Previous government attempts to reduce the number in circulation had failed. The mandats were designed to reduce the 36.4 billion livres of assignats in circulation. The exchange rate was set at 30 assignats for 1 mandat, which could then be used to purchase real estate from the biens nationaux. Unlike the assignat land auctions, the mandats could be exchanged for property with a set price of 22 times the rental rate value in 1790. The mandats were limited to 2.4 billion livres based on the biens nationaux, which the currency could theoretically be exchanged for. Legislators hoped the land-backed mandats would stabilize the paper currency situation in the same fashion as metallic backed currency.

== Issues leading to failure ==
Rumors that the mandats would not be accepted outside of Paris started before the currency could be designed and printed. While the mandats were legally given value equal to that of metallic currency, the government structure of the Directory lacked means and desire to force its use. The success of the mandats was left up to the citizens of France to decide, as had been promised by their legislators. Only during the Terror was the use of paper currency made obligatory and the price of goods stabilized. The creation of the mandats was an attempt to return to a natural monetary policy. Both the assignats and the mandats were theoretically backed by the biens nationaux they differed in how those lands could be procured. Unlike the auctions used for properties sold in assignats that capitalized on competitive bidding, the mandats were intended to bring stability to the market and subsequently to itself. The legal wording for both currencies however, was similar and offered little guarantee of stability for French citizens who had reason to distrust paper money.

== Outcome ==
The mandat was only briefly in circulation. The legislation that created the mandat was passed on 18 March 1796 but rapidly fell into decline and was without real value within months. Rumors that the mandats would not be accepted and a history of hyperinflation lead many merchants to reject the mandats as they had the assignats. The new currency did little to solve the economic problems and workers were angered that new enforcement measures were not put in place to prevent discrimination between mandats and coin.

Those who had large quantities of assignats and chose to convert them early on were able to use them to access cheap lands from the biens nationaux. The supply of land was insufficient for the value of mandats issued and quickly became exhausted. Without real estate backing the currency it became worthless fiat money. The viability of the mandats and paper currency in general were further diminished by a law passed on Thermidor 5 IV that allowed contracts to be negotiated in whatever units individuals preferred. Precious metals were strongly preferred but negotiation also included commodities in situations where specie was not available. The mandats were first issued on 18 March 1796 but by April were already being traded at 20% face value. Three months after the mandats began to be issued they were entirely devalued but they were integral in allowing the government to function during that time. Rapid loss of value forced the government to stop honoring the face value of the currency against the biens nationaux. French citizens who managed to hoard metallic currency, and those with large stockpiles of paper money who acted quickly, were able to benefit from the currency crisis. Those who were of limited means only saw their poverty increase.
