= Assignation ruble =

Paper currency of the Russian Empire

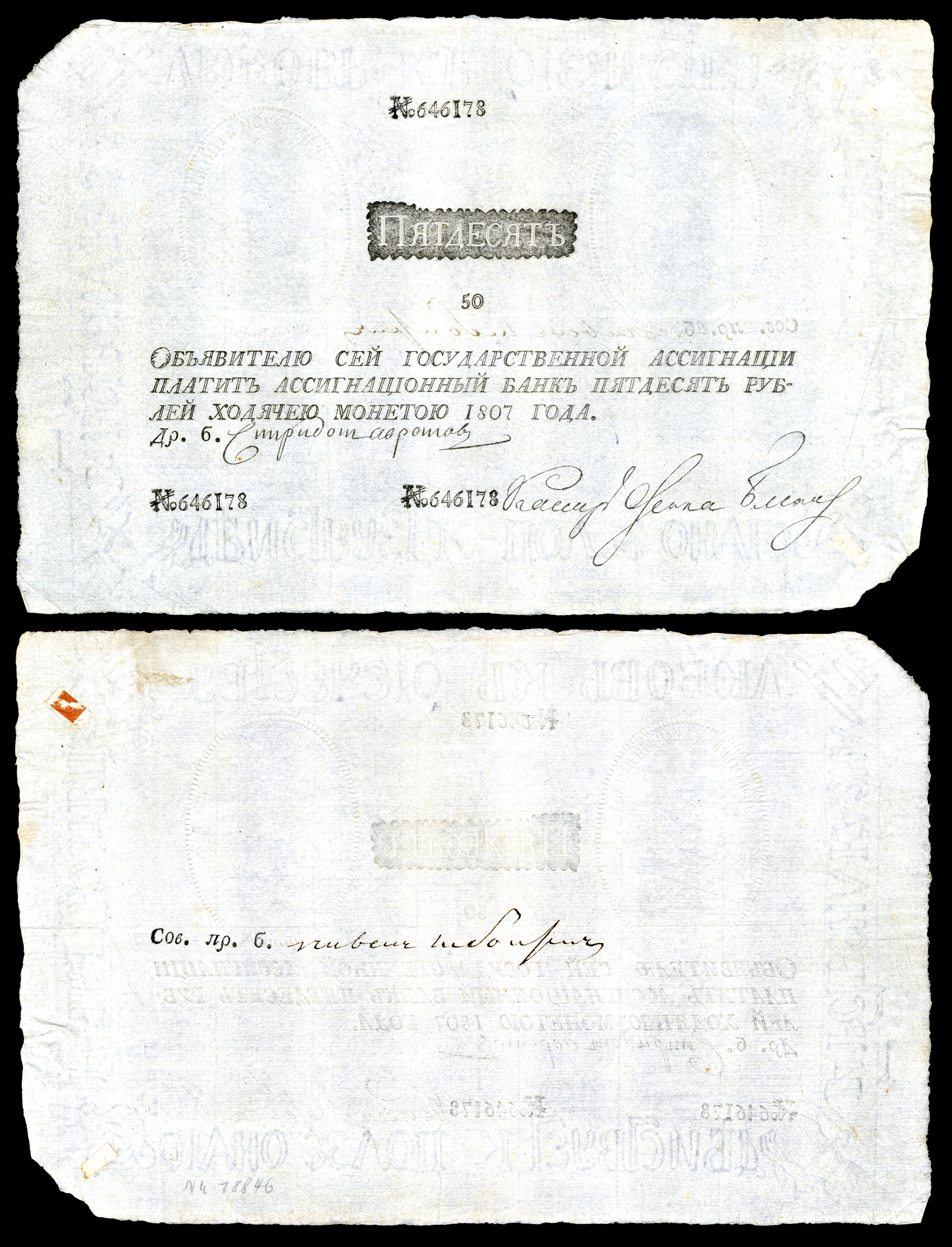
Russian State Assignat-50 Rubles (1807)

The Assignation ruble (Russian: ассигнационный рубль; assignatsionny rubl) was the first paper currency of the Russian Empire. It was used from 1769 until 1849. The Assignation ruble had a parallel circulation with the silver ruble; there was an ongoing market exchange rate for these two currencies. Initially at parity with the silver ruble, the value of the Assignation ruble fell considerably below that of the silver ruble, finally settling at 3.50 Assignation rubles per silver ruble in the 1840s.

== History ==
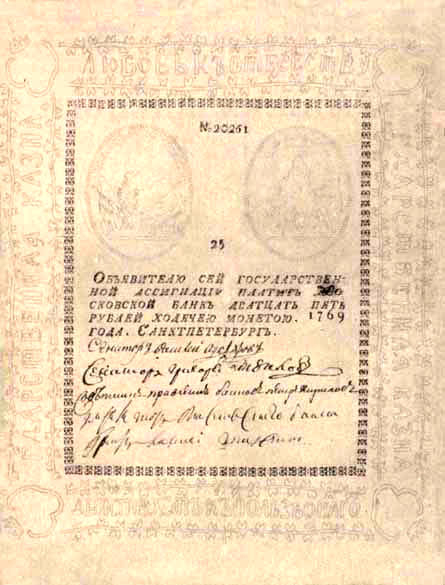
25 Assignation rubles of 1769

In 1768, during the reign of Catherine the Great, the Russian Assignation Bank was founded to issue the first official paper currency. It opened branches in St. Petersburg and Moscow in 1769. Several bank branches were afterwards established in other towns, called government towns. Notes of the denominations 100, 75, 50, and 25 rubles were issued upon payment of similar sums in copper money, which were refunded upon the presentation of those paper notes.

The emergence of Assignation rubles was due to large government spending on military matters, leading to a shortage of silver in the treasury, as all financial calculations, especially in foreign trade, were conducted exclusively in silver and gold coins. This lack of silver, and the huge masses of copper coins in circulation in the Russian domestic market, led to large payments becoming extremely difficult to implement, necessitating the introduction of some form of paper currency for large transactions.

The initial circulation of the Assignation Bank amounted to one million rubles worth of copper coins, with 500 thousand rubles each in the St. Petersburg and Moscow offices; thus the total emission of banknotes was also limited to one million rubles.

== Issuance of the assignation ruble ==
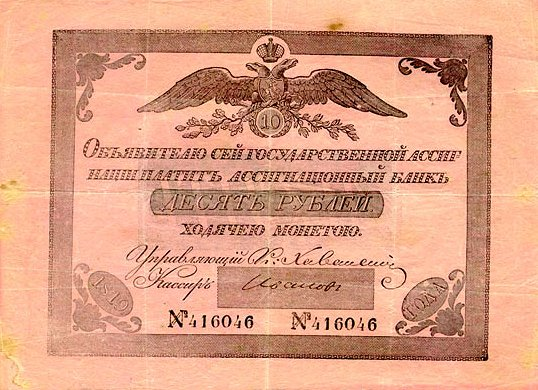
10 Assignation rubles of 1819

Between 1769 and 1843 five issuances of the Assignation ruble were carried out. Virtually all (except some denominations of the 1802 issue) were issued across a number of years. One issue (1785–87) was known to have two separate series.

Series of Russian assignats
Issue	Denom	Dates	Comments
1769 Issue	25 Rubles	1769–73	
1769 Issue	50 Rubles	1769–73	
1769 Issue	75 Rubles	1769–73	
1769 Issue	100 Rubles	1769–73	
1774 Issue	25 Rubles	1774–84	
1774 Issue	50 Rubles	1774–84	
1774 Issue	100 Rubles	1774–84	
1785–87 Issue	5 Rubles	1787–1802; 1803–18	
1785–87 Issue	10 Rubles	1787–1801; 1803–17	
1785–87 Issue	25 Rubles	1785–1802; 1803–18	
1785–87 Issue	50 Rubles	1785–1802; 1803–18	
1785–87 Issue	100 Rubles	1785–1801; 1803–18	
1802 Issue	5 Rubles	1802	
1802 Issue	10 Rubles	1802–03	
1802 Issue	25 Rubles	1802	
1802 Issue	100 Rubles	1802	
1818–43 Issue	5 Rubles	1819–43	
1818–43 Issue	10 Rubles	1819–43	
1818–43 Issue	20 Rubles	1822	
1818–43 Issue	25 Rubles	1818–43	
1818–43 Issue	50 Rubles	1818–43	
1818–43 Issue	100 Rubles	1819–43	
1818–43 Issue	200 Rubles	1819–43	

== Financial reforms of 1839-1843 ==
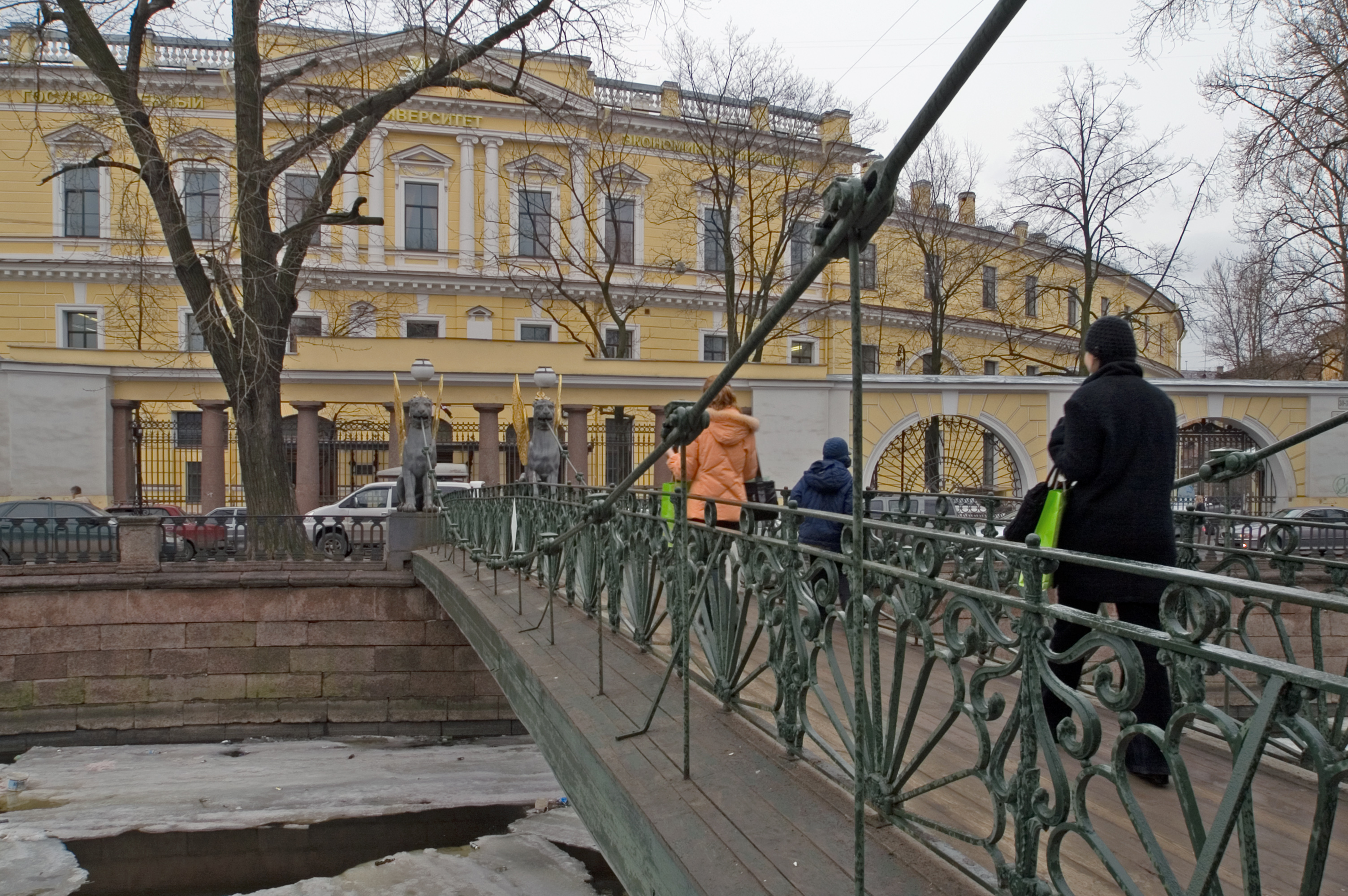
Assignation Bank building in St. Petersburg today; Bank Bridge in the foreground

In 1843, all Assignation rubles were withdrawn from circulation and replaced with the new state credit notes (Russian: государственные кредитные билеты) in denominations of 1, 3, 5, 10, 25, 50 and 100 rubles. The Assignation Bank was replaced by the State Bank, and formally ceased operations in 1848. This was part of the monetary reforms of 1839–43, which improved the Russian fiscal system considerably. These reforms were driven by Georg von Cancrin, the Russian Minister of Finance from 1823 to 1844.

== See also ==
- Russian ruble
- State Bank of the Russian Empire
