= Andrew Dickson White =

American historian and politician (1832–1918)

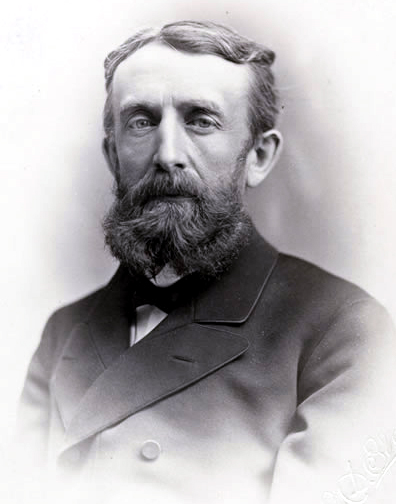
- White in 1885

1st President of Cornell University
- In office 1866–1885
- Preceded by: Office established
- Succeeded by: Charles Kendall Adams

16th United States Ambassador to Germany
- In office June 19, 1879 – August 15, 1881
- Preceded by: Bayard Taylor
- Succeeded by: Aaron Augustus Sargent

1st President of the American Historical Association
- In office 1884–1885
- Preceded by: Office established
- Succeeded by: George Bancroft

41st United States Ambassador to Russia
- In office July 22, 1892 – October 1, 1894
- Preceded by: Charles Emory Smith
- Succeeded by: Clifton R. Breckinridge

24th United States Ambassador to Germany
- In office June 12, 1897 – November 27, 1902
- Preceded by: Edwin F. Uhl
- Succeeded by: Charlemagne Tower Jr.

Member of the New York Senate from the 22nd district
- In office 1864–1867
- Preceded by: Allen Munroe
- Succeeded by: George N. Kennedy

Personal details
- Born: November 7, 1832 Homer, New York, U.S.
- Died: November 4, 1918 (aged 85) Andrew Dickson White House, Ithaca, New York, U.S.
- Resting place: Sage Chapel, Cornell University, Ithaca, New York, U.S. 42.447307°N 76.484592°W
- Party: Republican
- Height: 5 ft 5 in (165 cm)
- Spouses: Mary A. Outwater (m. 1859; died 1887) Helen Magill (m. 1890–1918)
- Education: Yale College (BA, MA)
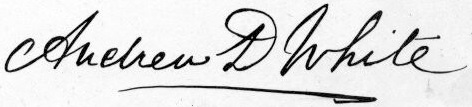
- Signature

Andrew Dickson White (November 7, 1832 – November 4, 1918) was an American historian and educator who co-founded Cornell University, one of eight Ivy League universities in the United States, and served as its first president for nearly two decades. He was known for expanding the scope of college curricula. A politician, he had served as New York state senator and was later appointed as U.S. ambassador to Germany and Russia.

He was one of the founders of the conflict thesis, which states that science and religion have historically been in conflict, and tried to prove it over the course of approximately 800 pages in his History of the Warfare of Science with Theology in Christendom.

== Early life and education ==
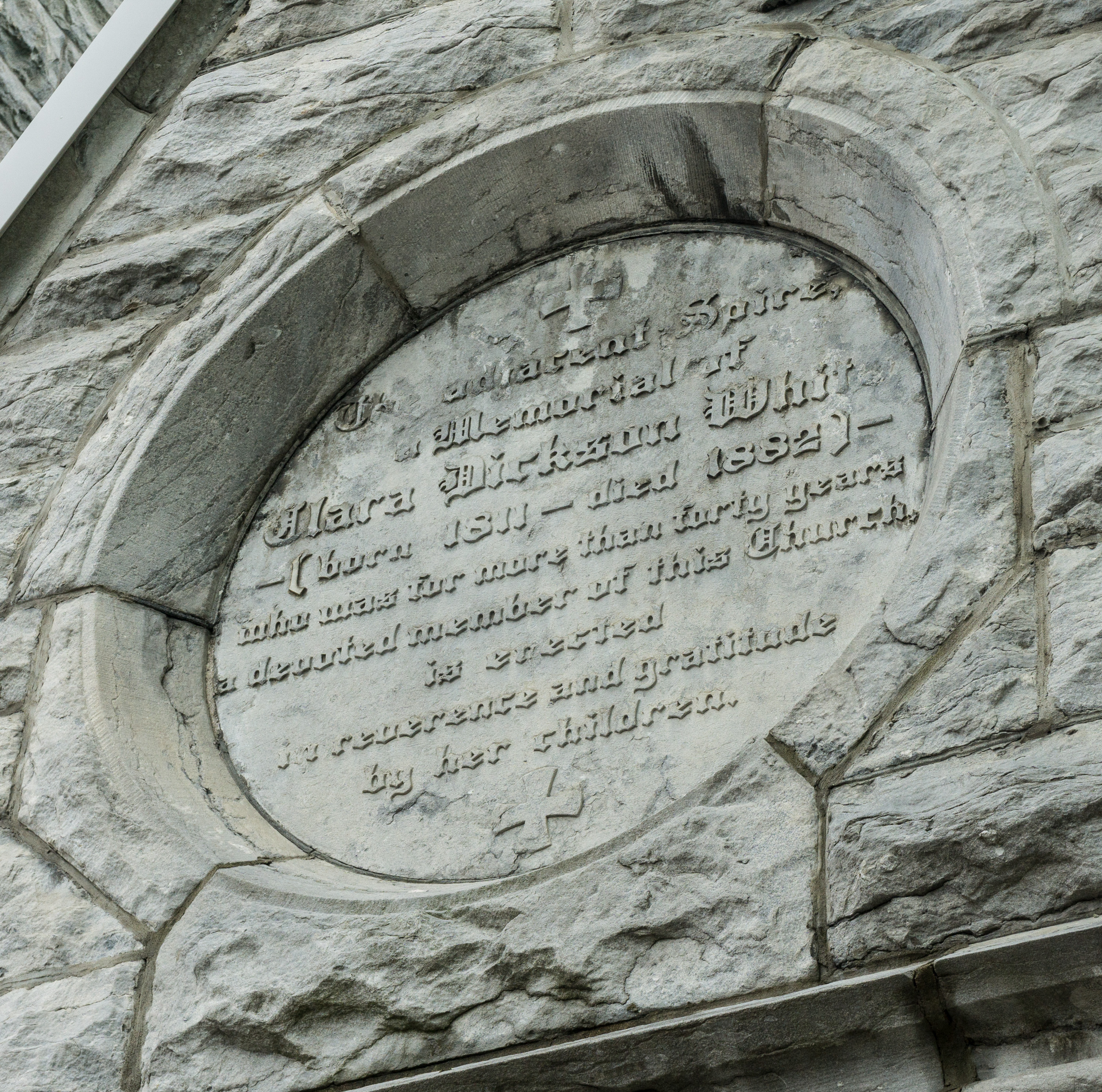
Andrew and his brother dedicated the spire of St. Paul's Cathedral in Syracuse to their mother

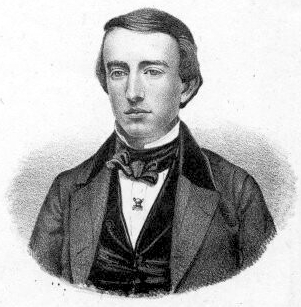
White as a junior or senior at Yale College wearing his Skull and Bones pin

White was born on November 7, 1832, in Homer, New York, to Clara (née Dickson) and Horace White. Clara was the daughter of Andrew Dickson, a New York State Representative in 1832 and his wife. Horace was the son of Asa White, a farmer from Massachusetts, and his wife. Their once-successful farm was ruined by a fire when Horace was 13.

Despite little formal education and struggles with poverty after his family lost their farm, Horace White became a businessman and wealthy merchant. In 1839, he opened what became Syracuse Savings Bank in Syracuse. Horace and Clara White had two children: Andrew Dickson and his brother. Andrew was baptized in 1835 at the Calvary Episcopal Church on the town green in Homer.

One of Andrew's cousins, Edwin White, became an artist of the Luminism style and Hudson River School. His nephew was Horace White, governor of New York.

Beginning in the fall of 1849, White enrolled as an undergraduate at Geneva College, known today as Hobart and William Smith Colleges, at the insistence of his father. He was inducted as a member of Sigma Phi Society in 1850 and he served as editor of the fraternity's publication, The Flame. White remained active in the fraternity for the rest of his life, founding the Cornell chapter and serving as the national president from 1913 to 1915. In his autobiography, he recalled that he had felt that his time at Geneva was "wasted" by being at the small Episcopalian school instead of at "one of the larger New England universities". White dropped out in 1850.

After a period of estrangement, White persuaded his father to let him transfer to Yale College. At Yale, White was a classmate of Daniel Coit Gilman, who later served as the first president of Johns Hopkins University in Baltimore. The two were members of the Skull and Bones secret society and would remain close friends. They traveled together in Europe after graduation and served together on the Venezuela Boundary Commission (1895–1896). His roommate was Thomas Frederick Davies Sr., who later became the third bishop of the Episcopal Diocese of Michigan, 1889–1905. Other members of White's graduating year included Edmund Clarence Stedman, the poet and essayist; Wayne MacVeagh, Attorney General of the United States and U.S. Ambassador to Italy; and Hiram Bingham II, the missionary, collectively comprising the so-called "famous class of '53." According to White, he was deeply influenced in his academic career and life by Professor Noah Porter (later, Yale's president), who personally instructed him in rhetoric and remained a close personal friend until Porter's death.

He also served as an editor of The Lit., known today as the Yale Literary Magazine. He belonged to Linonia, a literary and debating society. As a junior, White won the Yale literary prize for the best essay, writing on the topic "The Greater Distinctions in Statesmanship;" this was a surprise as traditionally a senior was chosen for the winning essay. Also as a junior, White joined the junior society Psi Upsilon. In his senior year, White won the Clark Prize for English disputation and the De Forest prize for public oratory, speaking on the topic "The Diplomatic History of Modern Times". Valued at $100, the De Forest prize was then the largest prize of its kind at any educational institution, American or otherwise. In addition to academic pursuits, White was on the Yale crew team, and competed in the first Harvard–Yale Regatta in 1852.

After graduation, White traveled and studied in Europe with his classmate Daniel Coit Gilman. Between 1853 and 1854, he studied at the Sorbonne, the Collège de France, and the University of Berlin. He also served as the translator for Thomas H. Seymour, the U.S. Ambassador to Russia, following Gilman's term as translator, although he had not studied French (the language of diplomacy and the Russian royal court) prior to his studies in Europe. After he returned the United States, White enrolled at Yale to earn a MA and be inducted into Phi Beta Kappa in 1856.

== Career ==
=== Academia ===
In October 1858, White accepted a position as a professor of History and English literature at the University of Michigan, where he remained on faculty until 1863. White made his lasting mark on the grounds of the university by enrolling students to plant elms along the walkways on The Diag. Between 1862 and 1863, he traveled to Europe to lobby France and Britain to assist the United States in the American Civil War or at least not to aid the Confederate States.

=== Founding of Cornell University ===
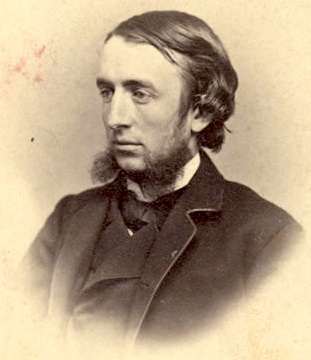
White in 1865, when he and Ezra Cornell co-founded Cornell University

In 1863, White returned to reside in Syracuse for business reasons. In November, he was elected to the New York State Senate on the Union Party ticket. In the Senate, White met the fellow upstate Senator Ezra Cornell, a self-taught Quaker farmer from Ithaca who had made a modest fortune in the telegraph industry. Around then, the senators were called on to decide how best to use the higher education funding provided by the Morrill Land-Grant Colleges Act, which allocated timberland in the Midwest, which states could sell as they saw fit. Through effective management by Cornell, New York, generated about $2.5 million (equivalent to $65 million in today dollars) from its allotted scrip, a greater yield per acre than any state except perhaps California. The senators initially wanted to divvy the funds among the numerous small state colleges of their districts. White fervently argued that the money would be more effectively used if it endowed only one university. Ezra Cornell agreed and told White, "I have about half a million dollars more than my family will need: what is the best thing I can do with it for the State?" White immediately replied, "The best thing you can do with it is to establish or strengthen some institution of higher learning." The two thus combined their efforts to form a new university.

White pressed for the university to be located on the hill in Syracuse, the current location of Syracuse University, because of the city's transportation hub. That could help attract faculty, students, and other persons of note. However, as a young carpenter working in Syracuse, Cornell had been robbed of his wages, and insisted for the university to be in his hometown of Ithaca. He proposed to donate land on his large farm on East Hill, overlooking the town and Cayuga Lake. White convinced Cornell to give his name to the university "in accordance with [the] time-honored American usage" of naming universities after their largest initial benefactors. On February 7, 1865, White introduced a bill "to establish the Cornell University" and, on April 27, 1865, after months of debate, Governor Reuben E. Fenton signed into law the bill endowing Cornell University as the state's land-grant institution.In 1865, White also authored "...The Negro's Right to Citizenship - a very detailed legal, ethical and logical argument for citizenship for the Negro." A staunch abolitionist, White was also the author of "abolition of Slavery the Right of Government under the War Powers Act" as well as several other legal arguments in favor of the Negro."

White became the school's first president and served as a professor in the Department of History. He commissioned Cornell's first architecture student, William Henry Miller, to build his president's mansion on campus.

White was elected a member of the American Philosophical Society in 1869 and American Antiquarian Society in 1884.

In 1891, Leland and Jane Stanford asked White to serve as the first president of Stanford University, which they had founded in Palo Alto, California. Although he refused, he recommended his former student David Starr Jordan.

=== Conflict thesis ===
At the time of Cornell's founding, White announced that it would be "an asylum for Science—where truth shall be sought for truth's sake, not stretched or cut exactly to fit Revealed Religion." Until then, most of America's private universities had been founded as religious institutions and generally were focused on the liberal arts and religious training.

In 1869, White gave a lecture on "The Battle-Fields of Science" in which he argued that history showed the negative outcomes resulting from any attempt on the part of religion to interfere with the progress of science. Over the next 30 years, he refined his analysis, expanding his case studies to include nearly every field of science over the entire history of Christianity but also narrowing his target from "religion" through "ecclesiasticism" to "dogmatic theology."

The final result was the two-volume A History of the Warfare of Science with Theology in Christendom (1896) in which he asserted the conflict thesis of science being against dogmatic theology. Initially less popular than John William Draper's History of the Conflict between Religion and Science (1874), White's book became an influential text in the 19th century on the relationship between religion and science. White's conflict thesis has been widely rejected among contemporary historians of science. The warfare depiction remains a popular view among critics of religion.

=== Diplomat ===
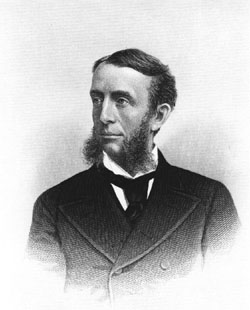
White's official portrait as U.S. ambassador to Russia, where he served from 1892 to 1894

While at Cornell, in 1871, he took leave to serve as a Commissioner to Santo Domingo, along with Benjamin Wade and Samuel Gridley Howe, at the request of President Ulysses Grant to determine the feasibility of an American annexation of the Dominican Republic. Their report (available here) supported the annexation, but Grant was unable to gain sufficient political support to take further action.

Later, White was appointed as the American ambassador to Germany (1879–1881). After returning to the United States, he was elected as the first president of the American Historical Association (1884–1886). Upstate New York Republicans nominated him for governor in 1876 and for Congress in 1886, but he did not win either primary.

Following his resignation in 1885 as Cornell's president, White served as the minister to Russia (1892–1894), president of the American delegation to The Hague Peace Conference (1899), and again as ambassador to Germany (1897–1902).

In 1904, White published his Autobiography, which he had written while he was relaxing in Italy after his retirement from the Department of State with the change in administrations. Cornell's third president, Jacob Gould Schurman, was appointed as ambassador to Germany from 1925 to 1929.

At the onset of World War I, White supported the German cause within Europe because he had strong professional and emotional ties to Germany. By the summer of 1915, he retreated from this position and refrained from offering any support either publicly or privately. In the fall of 1916, President Woodrow Wilson appointed White to a peace commission to prepare a treaty with China. As of December 1916, White had reduced some of his obligations, resigning from the Smithsonian Board of Regents and the trustees of the Carnegie Institution.

=== Bibliophile ===
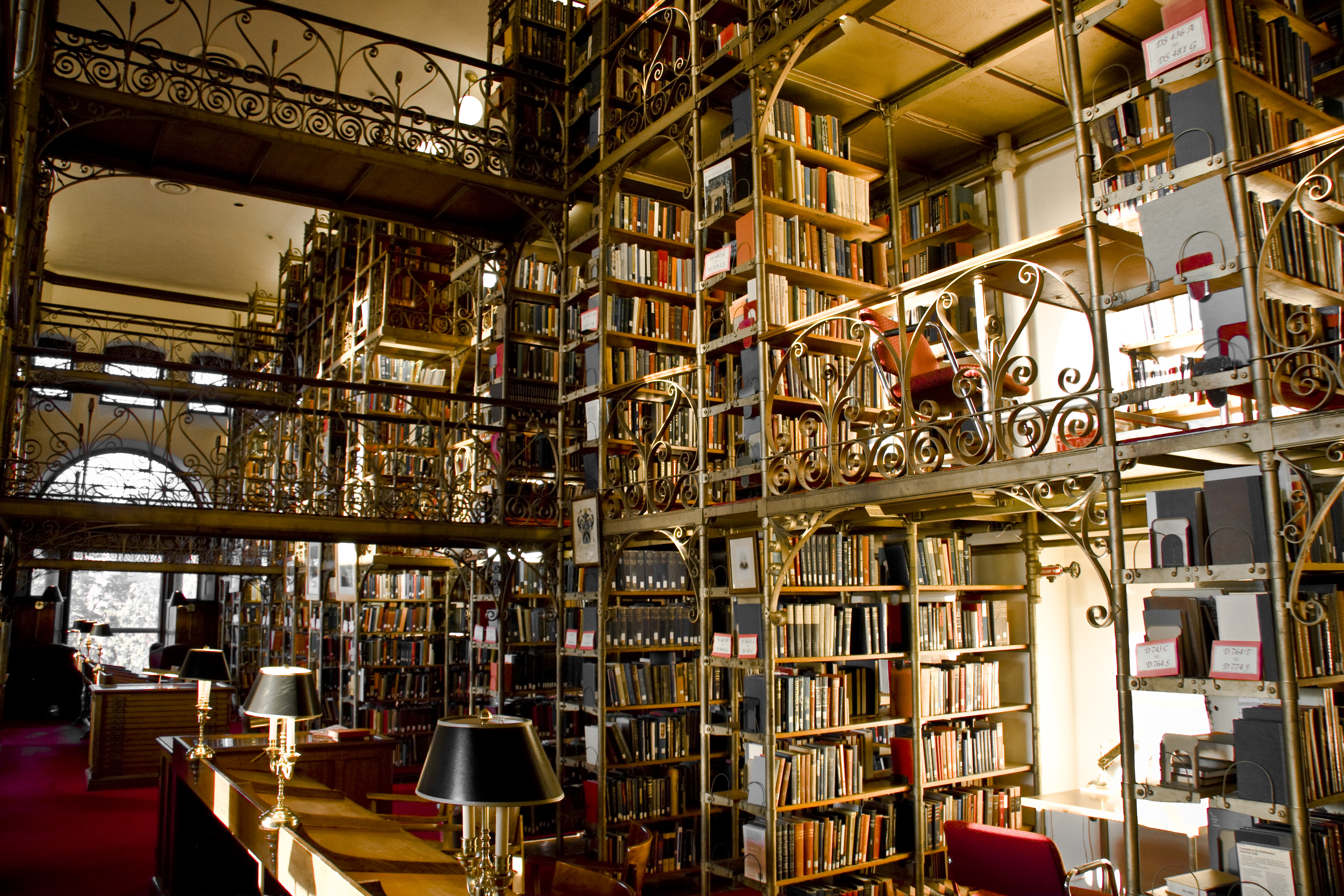
The A. D. White Reading Room at Cornell University Library, named in White's honor

Over the course of his career, White amassed a sizable book collection. His library included an extensive section on architecture, which then represented the largest architecture library in the United States. He donated all 4,000 books to the Cornell University Library for the purpose of teaching architecture as well as the remainder of his 30,000-book collection.

In 1879, White enlisted George Lincoln Burr, a former undergraduate assistant for one of his seminars, to manage the rare books collection. Though Burr would later hold other positions at the university, such as Professor of History, he remained White's collaborator and head of this collection until 1922 by traveling over Europe, locating and amassing books that White wanted. In particular, he built the collections on the Reformation, witchcraft, and the French Revolution. Today, White's collection is housed primarily in the Cornell Archives and in the Andrew Dickson White Reading Room (formally known as the "President White Library of History and Political Science") at Uris Library on the Ithaca Campus. The A.D. White Reading Room was designed by William Henry Miller, who had also designed White's mansion on campus.

While serving in Russia, White made the acquaintance of author Leo Tolstoy. Tolstoy's fascination with Mormonism sparked a similar interest in White, who had previously regarded the Latter-Day Saints (LDS) as a dangerous cult. Upon his return to the United States, White took advantage of Cornell's proximity to the religion's birthplace in Palmyra to amass a collection of LDS memorabilia (including many original copies of the Book of Mormon); it is unmatched by any other institution outside the church itself and its flagship Brigham Young University.

== Personal life ==
White married twice. His first marriage, on September 27, 1857, was to Mary Amanda Outwater (February 10, 1836 – June 8, 1887), daughter of Peter Outwater and Lucia M. Phillips of Syracuse. Mary's maternal grandmother Amanda Danforth, daughter of Asa Danforth Jr. and wife of Elijah Phillips Jr., was the first white child born in what would become Onondaga County, New York. Her great-grandfathers included General Asa Danforth, an early pioneer of upstate New York and leader of the State Militia, as well as Elijah Philips Sr., who had responded to the alarm to Lexington, Massachusetts, in 1775 and later served as the High Sheriff of Onondaga County.

Andrew and Mary had three children together: Frederick Davies White, who committed suicide in his forties in 1901 after a prolonged series of illnesses; Clara (White) Newbury, who died before her father; and Ruth (White) Ferry. After his wife died in 1887, White went on a lecture tour and traveled in Europe with his close friend, Daniel Willard Fiske, librarian at Cornell.

After three years as a widower, in 1890, White married Helen Magill, the daughter of Edward Magill, Swarthmore College's second president. She was the first woman in the United States to earn a Ph.D. Like her husband, Helen was a social scientist and educator; the two met at a conference where she was presenting a paper. Together, Helen and Andrew had three children.

== Death and legacy ==
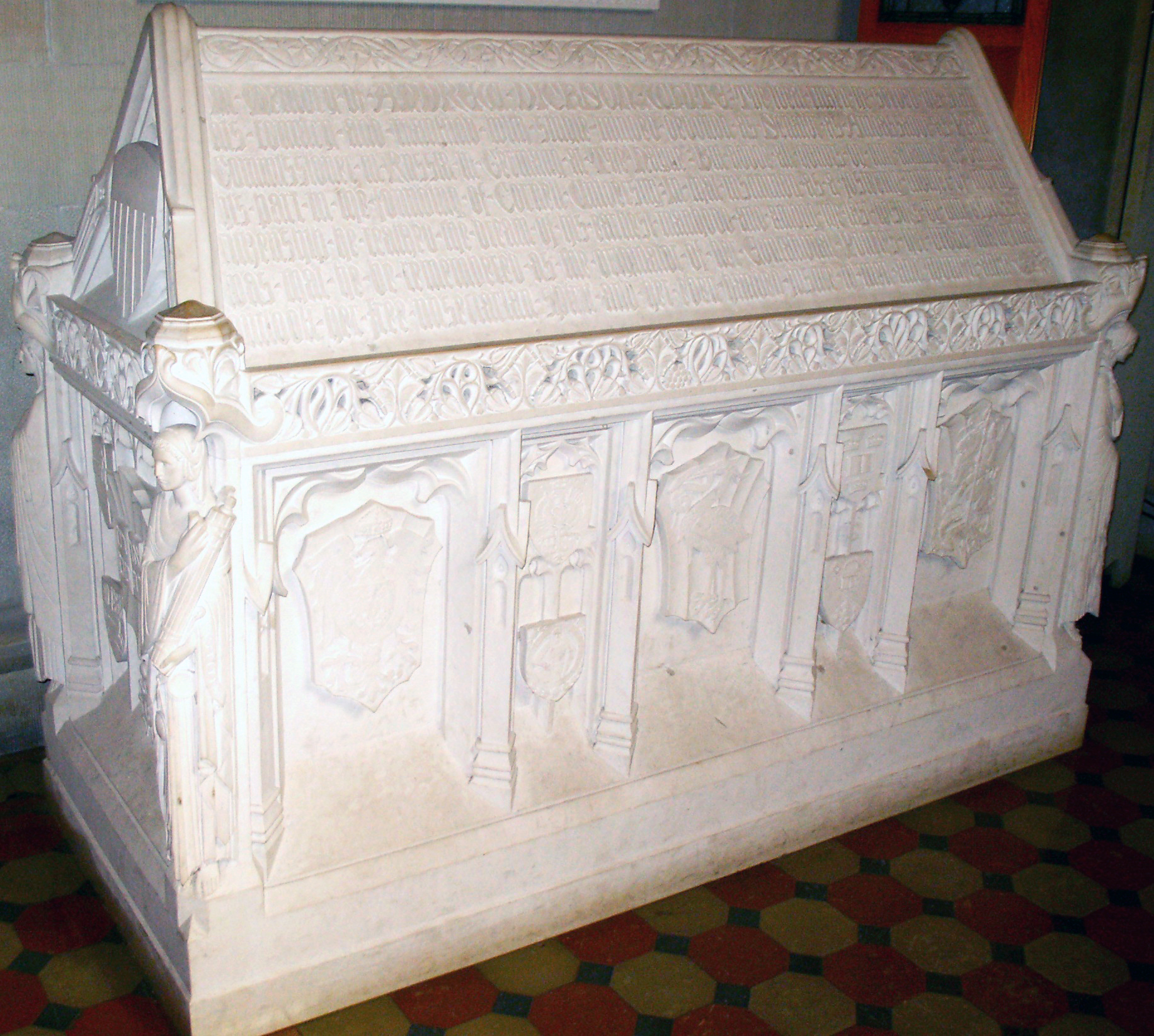
White is interred in Sage Chapel at Cornell University, where his sarcophagus features crests of nations where he served as an ambassador and icons of universities where he studied

On October 26, 1918, White suffered a slight paralytic stroke following a severe illness of several days. On the morning of Monday, November 4, White died at home in Ithaca. Three days later, on November 7, on what would have been White's 86th birthday, White was interred at Sage Chapel on the Cornell campus. The chapel was filled to capacity by faculty, trustees, and other well-wishers.

White's body resides in a sarcophagus in the Memorial Room with those of other persons deemed influential in the founding and early years of the university, including co-founder Ezra Cornell and benefactor Jennie McGraw-Fiske. His marble sarcophagus was designed in the popular Art Nouveau style. It features crests of countries and institutions that played important roles in White's life. For example, the adjacent picture shows the crests of the two countries where White was an ambassador; the coat of arms of Imperial Germany is on left and Saint George, a variation on the coat of arms of Moscow, representing Russia, is on the right.

The sarcophagus was completed in 1926 by sculptor Lee Oskar Lawrie (1877–1963), who also created sculptures adorning Myron Taylor Hall at Cornell. Lawrie is perhaps best known for his Atlas statue at Rockefeller Center in New York City.

In his will, White left $500,000 ($10.7 million in 2025) to Cornell University, in addition to the considerable sums donated to the institution earlier in his life.

=== Cornell University ===
In his 1904 autobiography, The Autobiography of Andrew Dickson White, White wrote:

During my life, which is now extending beyond the allotted span of threescore and ten, I have been engaged after the manner of my countrymen, in many sorts of work, have become interested in many conditions of men have joined in many efforts which I hope have been of use; but, most of all, I have been interested in the founding and maintaining of Cornell University, and by the part, I have taken in that, more than by any other work of my life I hope to be judged.

— Andrew Dickson White, The Autobiography of Andrew Dickson White (1904)

Until at least the mid-20th century, Cornell undergraduates with the surname 'White' were traditionally given the nickname 'Andy' in reference to White. Notably, E. B. White, author of the world-famous children's book Charlotte's Web, continued to go by the nickname 'Andy' for the rest of his life after his undergraduate years at Cornell.

== Legacy and honors ==
Historian Benjamin G, Rader argues that in creating Cornell:

White championed nondenominationalism, coeducation, an elective curriculum, and academic freedom. These positions won him a lasting reputation as a pioneer in the history of higher education.

According to professor Geoffrey Blodgett, White confronted a series of complex challenges in his long career:

Above all, the creation from scratch of a large, high-quality, coeducational, nonsectarian public university in the cockpit of post-Civil War, educational politics was an organizational chore of awesome subtlety for man of White's genteel background and soaring ideals."

Degrees received by Andrew Dickson White

Earned degrees

- Yale - A.B. (1853)
- Yale - M.A. History (1856)

White was awarded numerous honorary degrees, including:

- University of Michigan, LL.D. (1867)
- Cornell University, LL.D. (1886)
- Yale University, LL.D. (1887)
- Columbia University, L.H.D. (1887)
- University of Jena, Ph.D. (1889)
- St. Andrew's University, LL.D. (October 1902)
- Johns Hopkins University, LL.D. (1902)
- University of Oxford, D.C.L. in connection with the Bodleian Library tercentenary (October 1902)
- Dartmouth College, LL.D. (1906)

== Ancestry ==
Ancestors of Andrew Dickson White

Asa White
Horace White
Andrew White; 1832-1918
Andrew Dickson
Clara Dickson

== Selected bibliography ==
- Outlines of a Course of Lectures on History (1861).
- Syllabus of Lectures on Modern History (1876).
- Fiat Money Inflation in France: How It Came, What It Brought, and How It Ended; To Which is Added an Extract from Macaulay Showing the Results of the Tempering with the Currency of England. New York: D. Appleton and Company. 1896 – via Internet Archive.
- A History of the Warfare of Science with Theology in Christendom, 2 vols. (1896), online at Gutenberg text file.
- Seven Great Statesmen in the Warfare of Humanity with Unreason (1910).
- The Autobiography of Andrew Dickson White (1911), online at Autobiography of Andrew Dickson White: Vol. 1, Vol. 2
- Fiat Money Inflation in France: How It Came, What It Brought, and How It Ended 3rd Edition, Libertarian Press (PDF) (3rd ed.). New York: D. Appleton and Company. 1933 – via mises.org. , e-text

== See also ==
- Andrew Dickson White House

New York State Senate
Preceded by Allen Munroe	New York State Senate; 22nd District; 1864–1867	Succeeded by George N. Kennedy
Academic offices
Preceded by (none)	President of Cornell University; 1866–1885	Succeeded by Charles Kendall Adams
Diplomatic posts
Preceded by Bayard Taylor	United States Ambassador to Germany; 1879–1881	Succeeded by Aaron Augustus Sargent
Preceded by Charles Emory Smith	United States Ambassador to Russia; 1892–1894	Succeeded by Clifton R. Breckinridge
Preceded by Edwin F. Uhl	United States Ambassador to Germany; 1897–1902	Succeeded by Charlemagne Tower Jr.
